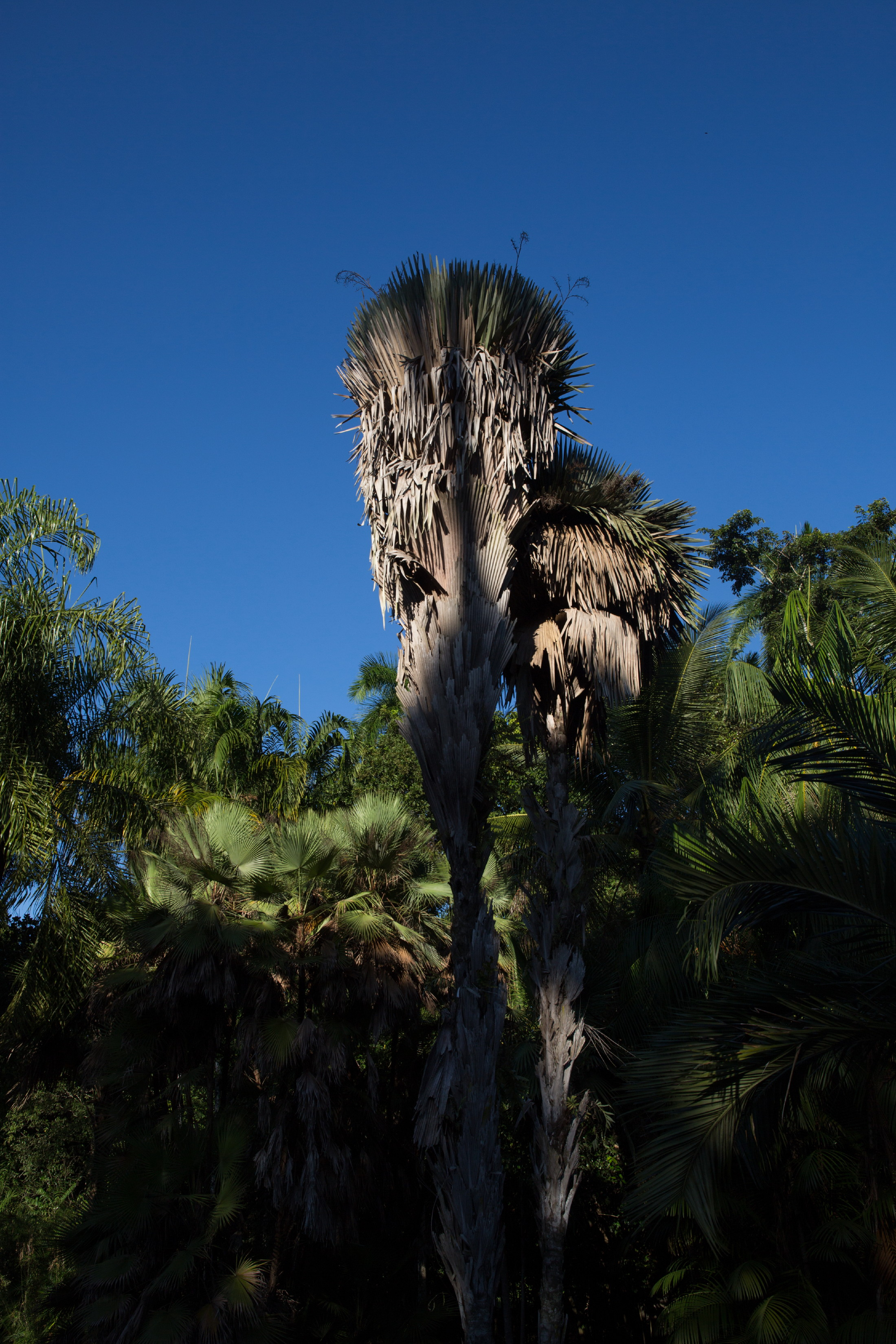
- Copernicia rigida in the Cupaynicú Botanical Garden, Cuba

Conservation status
- Least Concern (IUCN 3.1)

Scientific classification
- Kingdom: Plantae
- Clade: Tracheophytes
- Clade: Angiosperms
- Clade: Monocots
- Clade: Commelinids
- Order: Arecales
- Family: Arecaceae
- Tribe: Trachycarpeae
- Genus: Copernicia
- Species: C. rigida

Binomial name
- Copernicia rigida Britton & P.Wilson

Synonyms
- Copernicia rigida f. fissilingua León

= Copernicia rigida =

Species of palm

Copernicia rigida (commonly known as the jata palm) is a type of palm endemic to eastern and central Cuba. The ligules, the largest of any palm, are up to 100 cm (39 in) long by up to 21 cm (8.3 in) wide. The overall appearance of the palm resembles a shaving brush.
