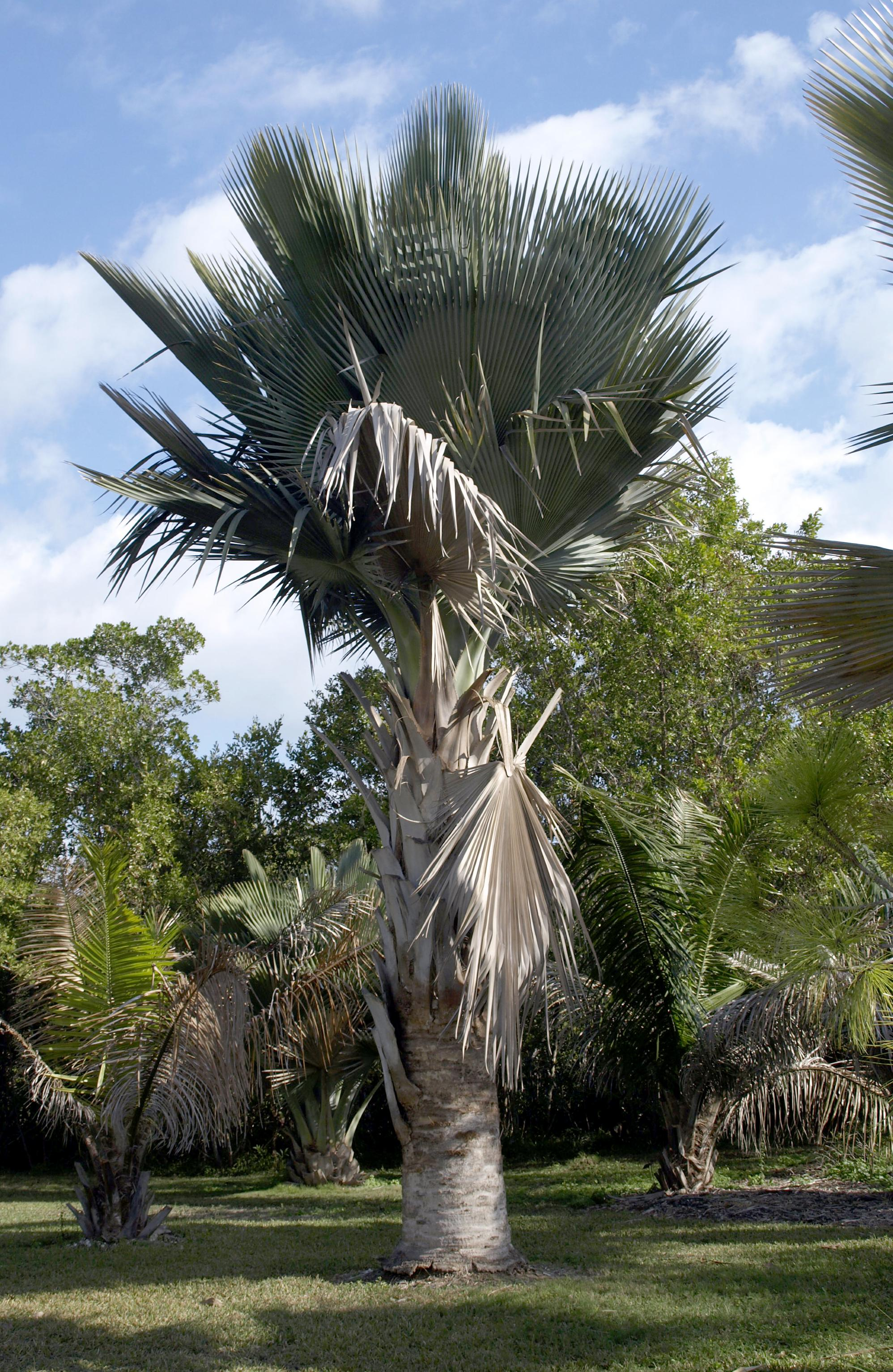

Conservation status
- Endangered (IUCN 3.1)

Scientific classification
- Kingdom: Plantae
- Clade: Tracheophytes
- Clade: Angiosperms
- Clade: Monocots
- Clade: Commelinids
- Order: Arecales
- Family: Arecaceae
- Tribe: Trachycarpeae
- Genus: Copernicia
- Species: C. fallaensis

Binomial name
- Copernicia fallaensis León

= Copernicia fallaensis =

Species of palm

Copernicia fallaensis is a species of flowering plant in the palm family Arecaceae. It is endemic to the region around Falla, Cuba. It is among the ten largest palm species, being up to 75 cm (30 in) or even 90 cm (35 in) DBH (diameter at breast height) and up to 20 m (66 ft) in height.

== Description ==
Copernicia fallaensis is a towering fan palm species with a smooth, light gray trunk that thickens at the middle and reaches up to 20 meters in height. Its dense, rounded crown is made up of large, rigid, palmate leaves, each divided into around 120 stiff segments that create an intricate, geometric pattern against the sky. The leaf color is a distinctive waxy blue-green, while the broad petioles can appear nearly white. In its native habitat, the fruits serve as an important food source for local wildlife, including fruit bats. Despite comparisons to Copernicia baileyana, this species stands apart with its commanding presence and striking appearance, making it one of the most visually impressive members of its genus.
