= Copernicia cowellii =

Scientific classification
- Kingdom: Plantae
- Clade: Tracheophytes
- Clade: Angiosperms
- Clade: Monocots
- Clade: Commelinids
- Order: Arecales
- Family: Arecaceae
- Tribe: Trachycarpeae
- Genus: Copernicia
- Species: C. cowellii

Binomial name
- Copernicia cowellii Britton & P.Wilson

Species of palm

Copernicia cowellii is a palm which is endemic to Camagüey Province, Cuba.
