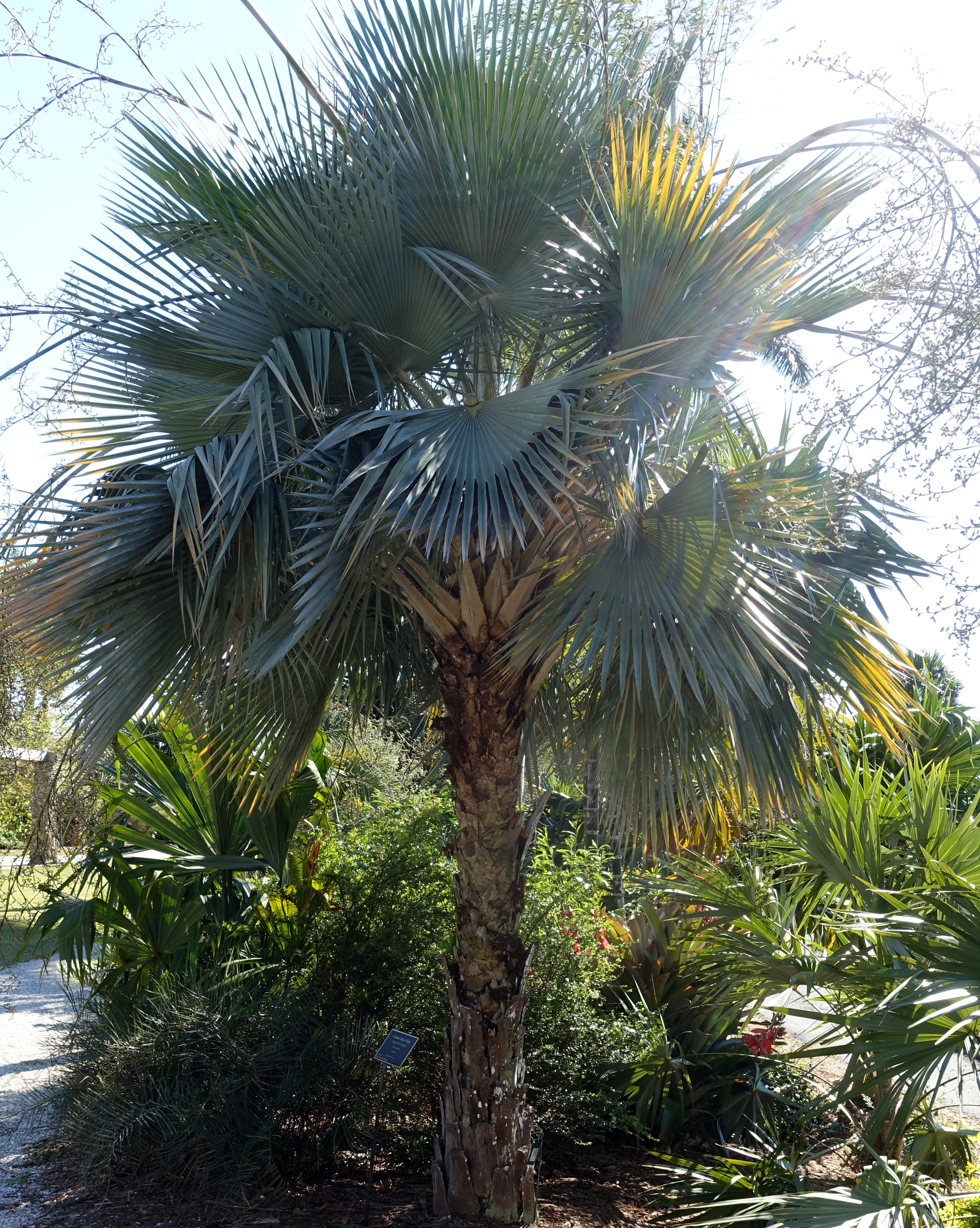

Scientific classification
- Kingdom: Plantae
- Clade: Tracheophytes
- Clade: Angiosperms
- Clade: Monocots
- Clade: Commelinids
- Order: Arecales
- Family: Arecaceae
- Tribe: Trachycarpeae
- Genus: Copernicia
- Species: C. hospita

Binomial name
- Copernicia hospita Mart.

= Copernicia hospita =

Species of palm

Copernicia hospita is a palm which is endemic to Cuba.

== Description ==
The circular blue gray waxy leaves of the Cuban wax palm, spread out like fans on long, thin, stems (petioles). Up to 40 leaves form a very characteristic circular outline, around the top of the trunk. The smooth columnar trunk can grow up to 1 ft (0.3 m) in diameter, and up to 26 ft (7.9 m) tall. Dainty brown flowers extend, past the leaves on uniquely hairy branches. This species of Copernicia is monoecious, flowers are bisexual. The fruits resemble black marbles, up to 1 in (2.5 m) across.
