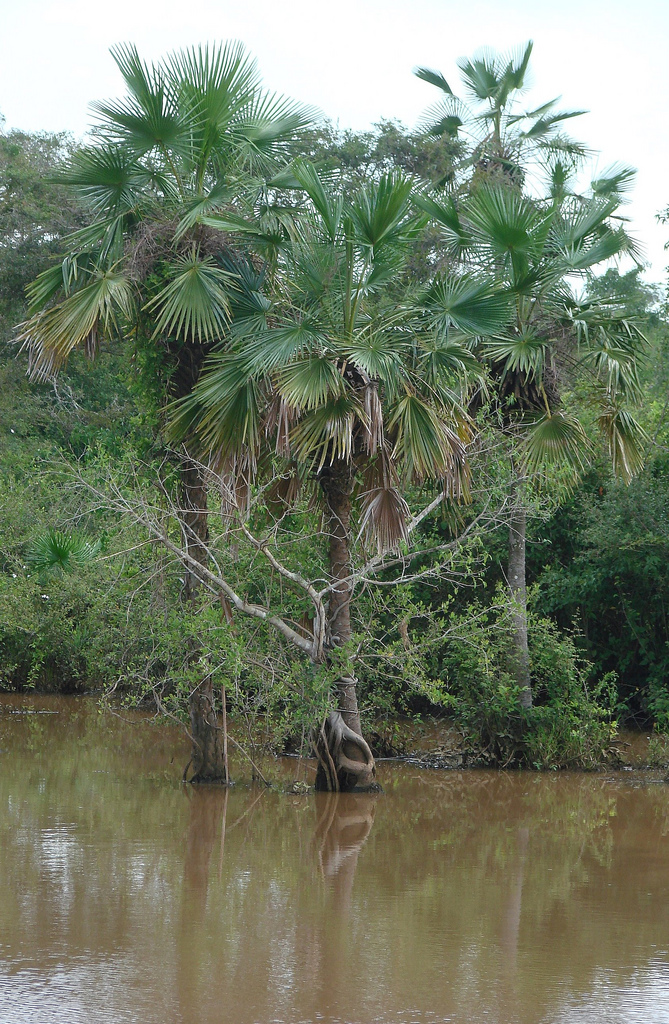

Scientific classification
- Kingdom: Plantae
- Clade: Tracheophytes
- Clade: Angiosperms
- Clade: Monocots
- Clade: Commelinids
- Order: Arecales
- Family: Arecaceae
- Tribe: Trachycarpeae
- Genus: Copernicia
- Species: C. tectorum

Binomial name
- Copernicia tectorum (Kunth) Mart.

= Copernicia tectorum =

Species of palm

Copernicia tectorum is a palm which is native to Colombia and northern Venezuela, where it is known as palma llanera.
