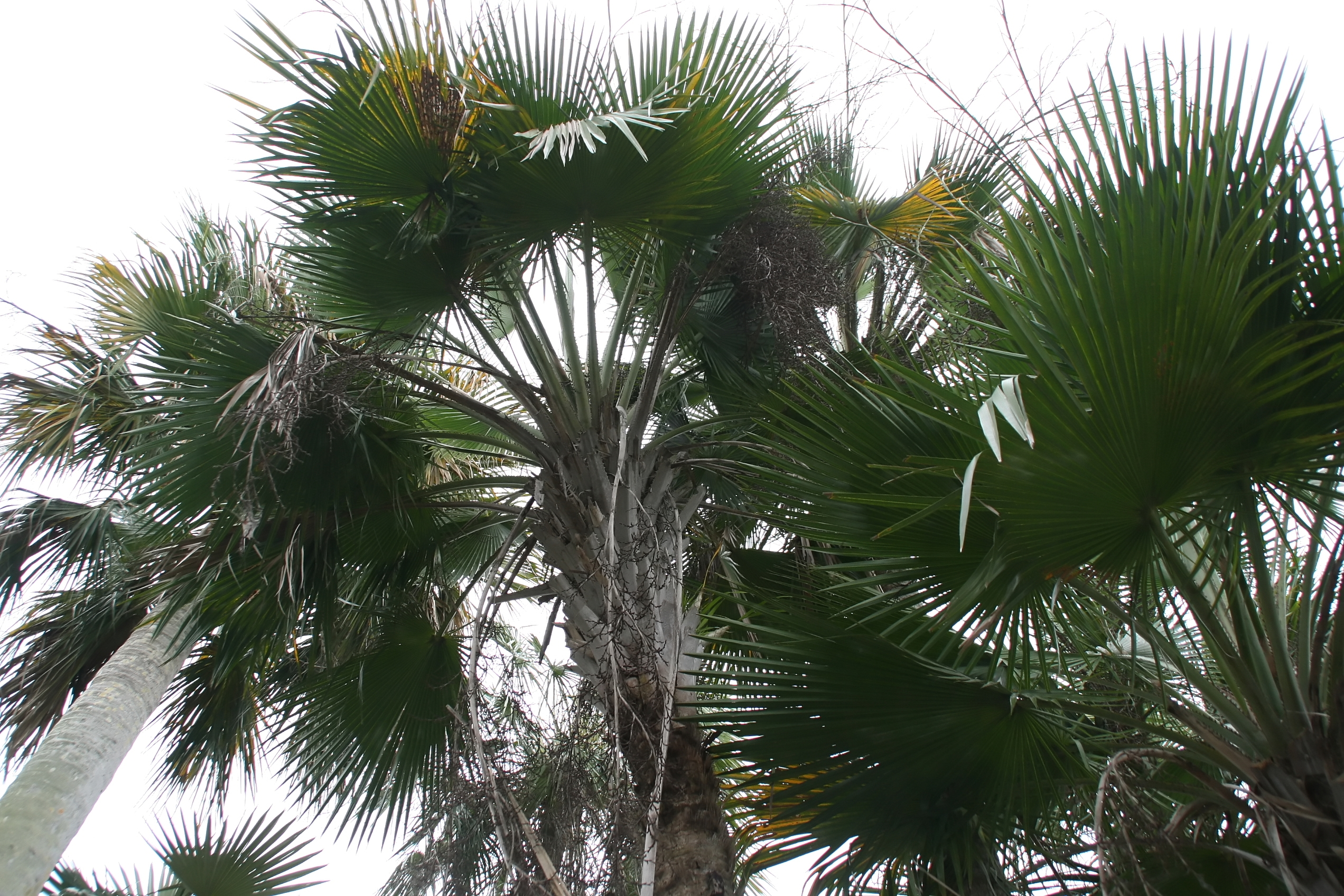
- Copernicia curtissii at Fairchild Tropical Botanic Garden, Miami, Florida

Scientific classification
- Kingdom: Plantae
- Clade: Tracheophytes
- Clade: Angiosperms
- Clade: Monocots
- Clade: Commelinids
- Order: Arecales
- Family: Arecaceae
- Tribe: Trachycarpeae
- Genus: Copernicia
- Species: C. curtissii

Binomial name
- Copernicia curtissii Becc.

= Copernicia curtissii =

Species of palm

Copernicia curtissii is a palm which is endemic to Cuba.
