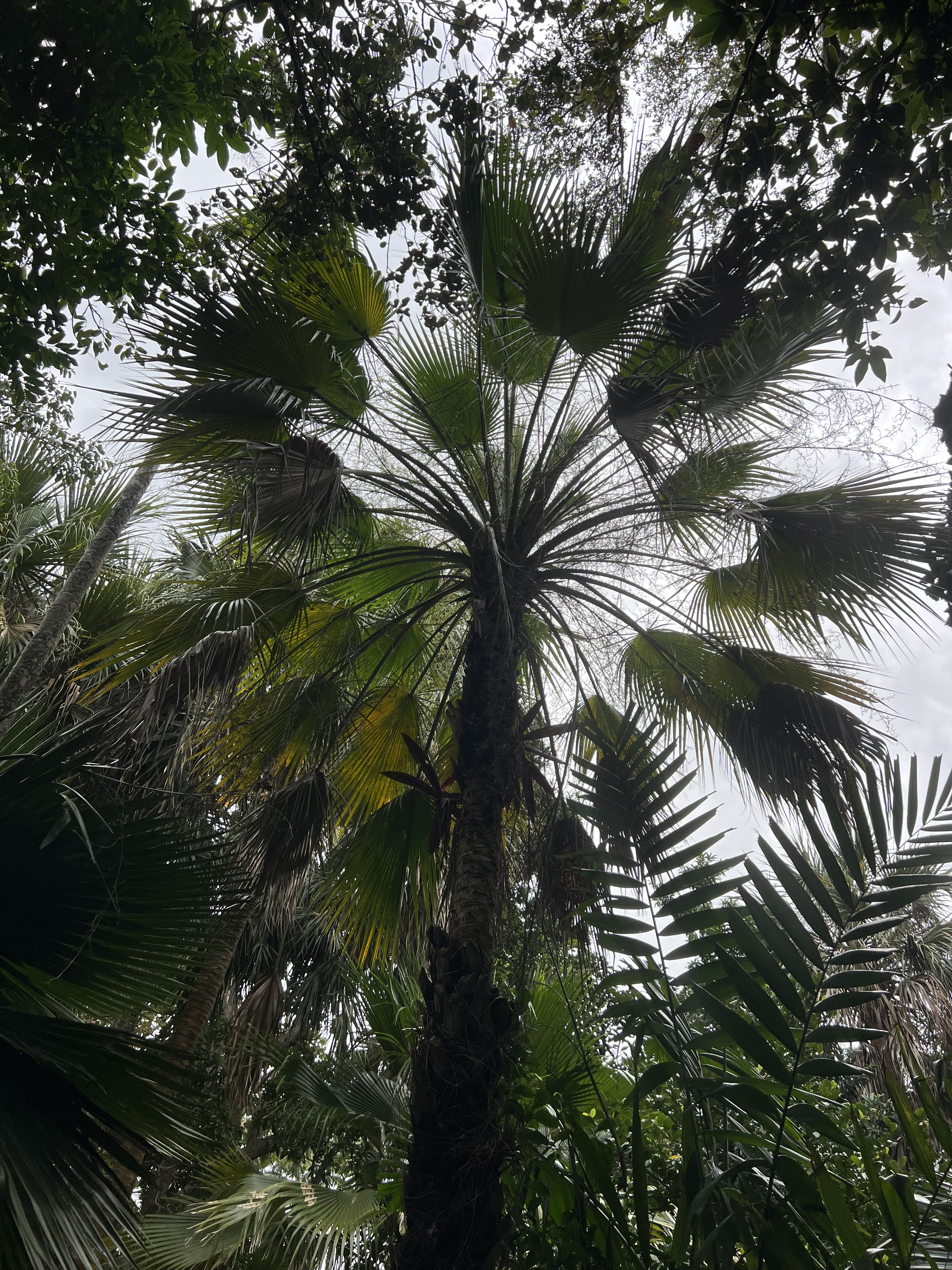

Scientific classification
- Kingdom: Plantae
- Clade: Embryophytes
- Clade: Tracheophytes
- Clade: Spermatophytes
- Clade: Angiosperms
- Clade: Monocots
- Clade: Commelinids
- Order: Arecales
- Family: Arecaceae
- Tribe: Trachycarpeae
- Genus: Copernicia
- Species: C. yarey

Binomial name
- Copernicia yarey Burret

= Copernicia yarey =

Species of palm

Copernicia yarey is a palm which is endemic to Cuba.
