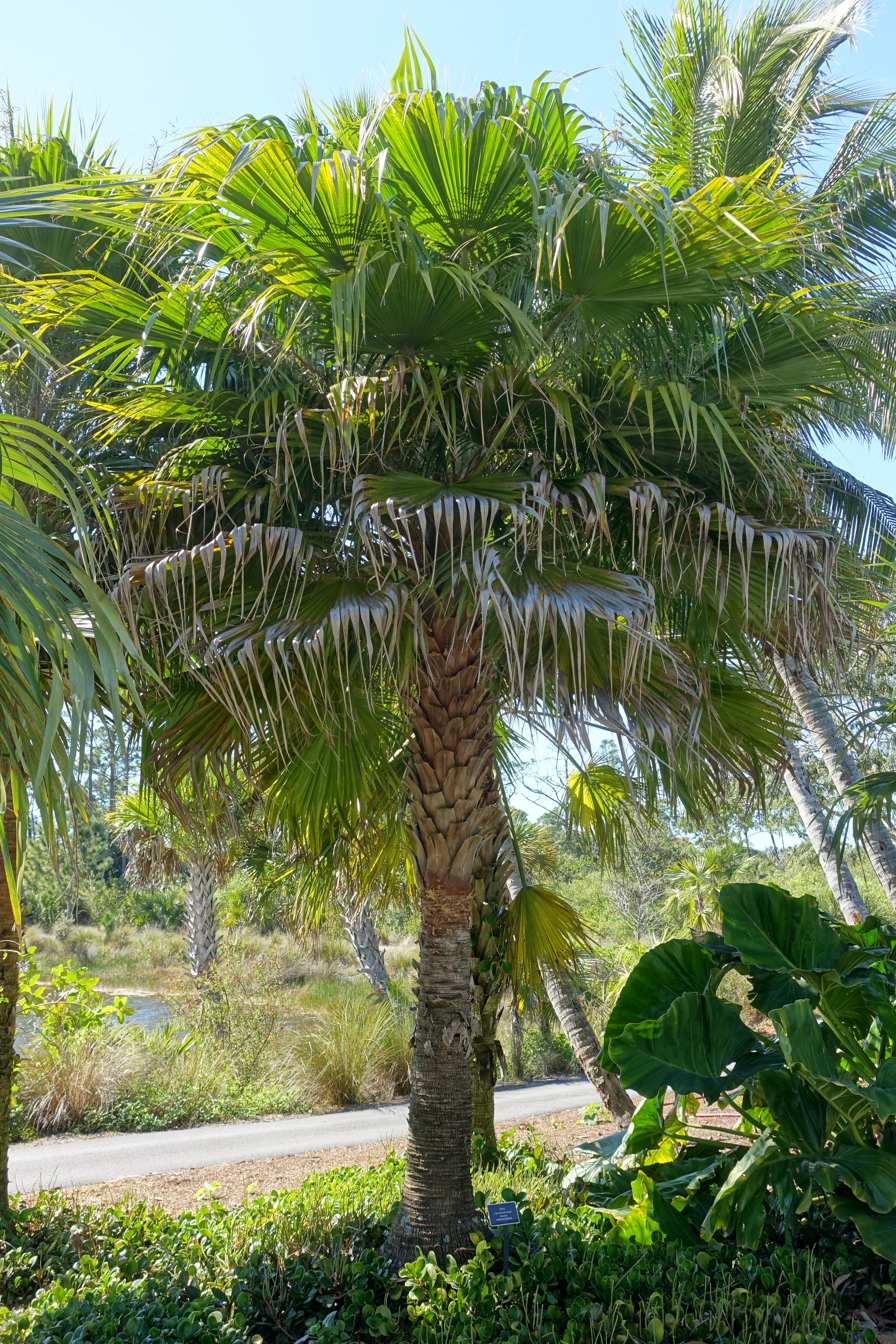

Scientific classification
- Kingdom: Plantae
- Clade: Tracheophytes
- Clade: Angiosperms
- Clade: Monocots
- Clade: Commelinids
- Order: Arecales
- Family: Arecaceae
- Tribe: Trachycarpeae
- Genus: Copernicia
- Species: C. berteroana

Binomial name
- Copernicia berteroana Becc.

= Copernicia berteroana =

Species of palm

Copernicia berteroana (dyaré, yarey) is a palm which is endemic to Hispaniola; it is also reported from Curaçao and Venezuela, but it is probably naturalized there.

== Description ==
Like other members of this genus, C. berteroana is a fan palm. Trees are 4 to 5 metres tall with stems 20 centimetres in diameter. The fruit is black, 2 centimetres long and 1.8 cm in diameter. The leaves are used for thatch.

== Habitat ==
Copernicia berteroana is found in flat regions with low rainfall. In Haiti it is threatened by habitat destruction.
