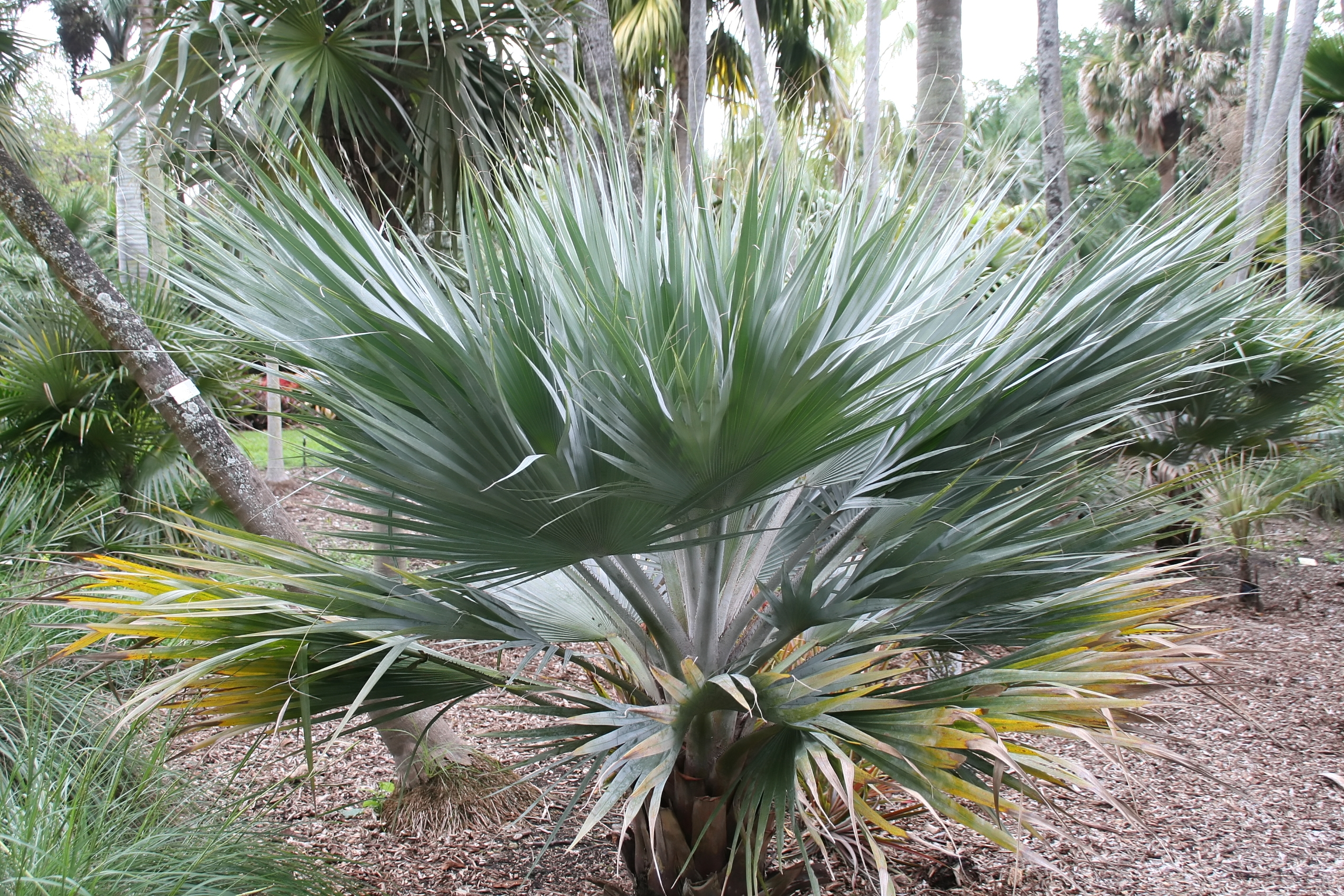

Conservation status
- Endangered (IUCN 3.1)

Scientific classification
- Kingdom: Plantae
- Clade: Tracheophytes
- Clade: Angiosperms
- Clade: Monocots
- Clade: Commelinids
- Order: Arecales
- Family: Arecaceae
- Tribe: Trachycarpeae
- Genus: Copernicia
- Species: C. ekmanii

Binomial name
- Copernicia ekmanii Burret

= Copernicia ekmanii =

Species of palm

Copernicia ekmanii is a palm which is endemic to northern Haiti.
