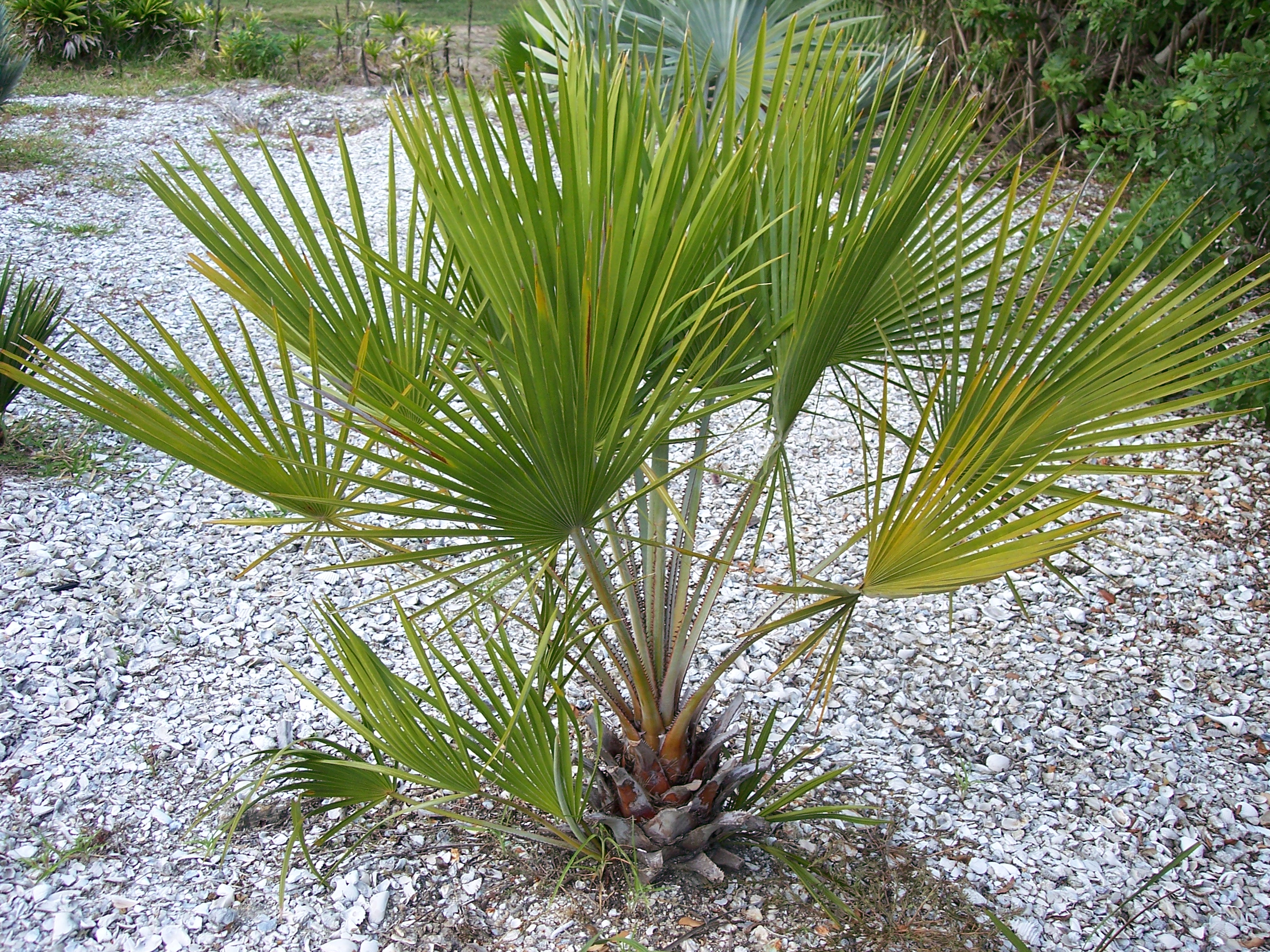

Scientific classification
- Kingdom: Plantae
- Clade: Tracheophytes
- Clade: Angiosperms
- Clade: Monocots
- Clade: Commelinids
- Order: Arecales
- Family: Arecaceae
- Tribe: Trachycarpeae
- Genus: Copernicia
- Species: C. glabrescens

Binomial name
- Copernicia glabrescens H.Wendl. ex Becc.

= Copernicia glabrescens =

Species of palm

Copernicia glabrescens is a palm which is endemic to western and west central Cuba.

== Description ==
This palm reaches a mature height of 20 feet (6 meters) with a spread of approximately 5 feet (1.5 meters). It exhibits both solitary and clustering growth habits, making it unique as the only known clustering species in the Copernicia genus. The leaves are palmate, rigid, and symmetrically arranged, often covered with a glaucous or waxy coating that helps reduce water loss and provides protection against intense sunlight. There are two recognized varieties: Copernicia glabrescens var. glabrescens, which typically has a solitary growth form with smooth, grayish stems, and Copernicia glabrescens var. ramosissima, which is notable for its clustering habit, producing multiple trunks from the base. This species thrives in warm, dry, and well-drained environments, often found in open woodlands or savannas, and is highly drought-tolerant due to its deep root system.

== Gallery ==
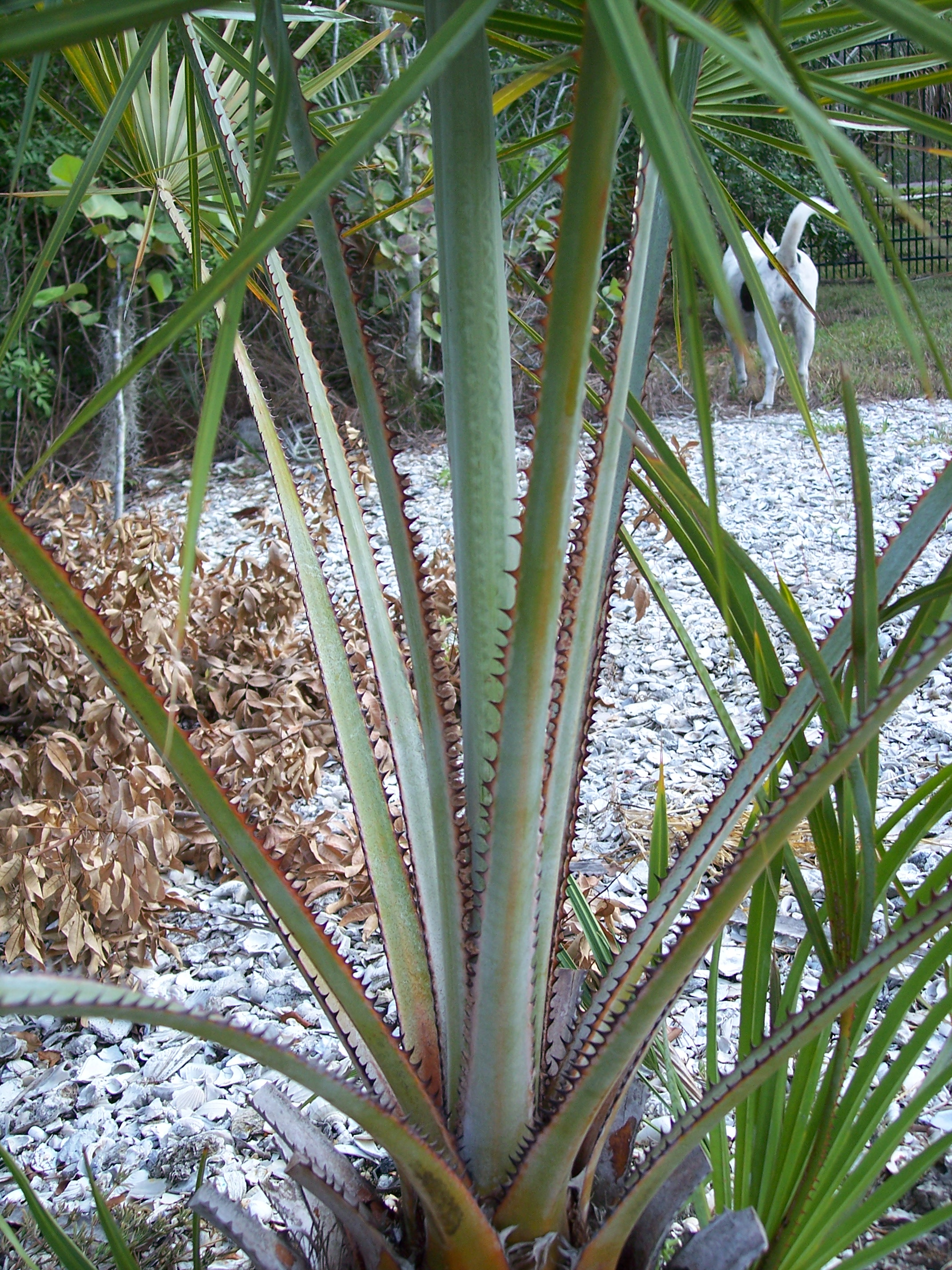
Armed petioles
