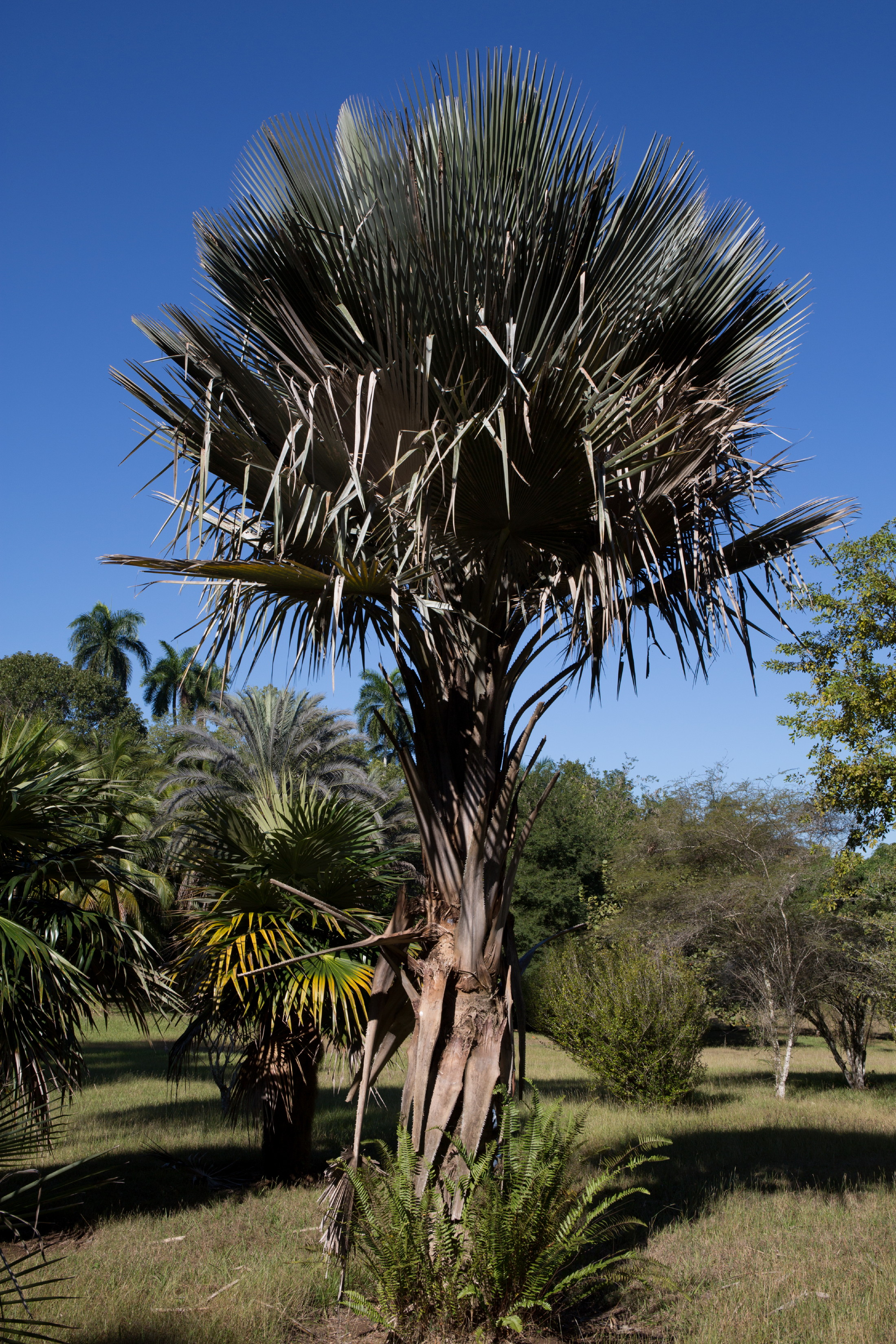
- Copernicia curbeloi in the Cupaynicú Botanical Garden, Cuba

Conservation status
- Endangered (IUCN 3.1)

Scientific classification
- Kingdom: Plantae
- Clade: Tracheophytes
- Clade: Angiosperms
- Clade: Monocots
- Clade: Commelinids
- Order: Arecales
- Family: Arecaceae
- Tribe: Trachycarpeae
- Genus: Copernicia
- Species: C. curbeloi

Binomial name
- Copernicia curbeloi León

Synonyms
- Copernicia molinetii var. cuneata León; Copernicia × sueroana var. semiorbicularis León

= Copernicia curbeloi =

Species of palm

Copernicia curbeloi is a species of flowering plant in the family Arecaceae. It is endemic to Cuba.
