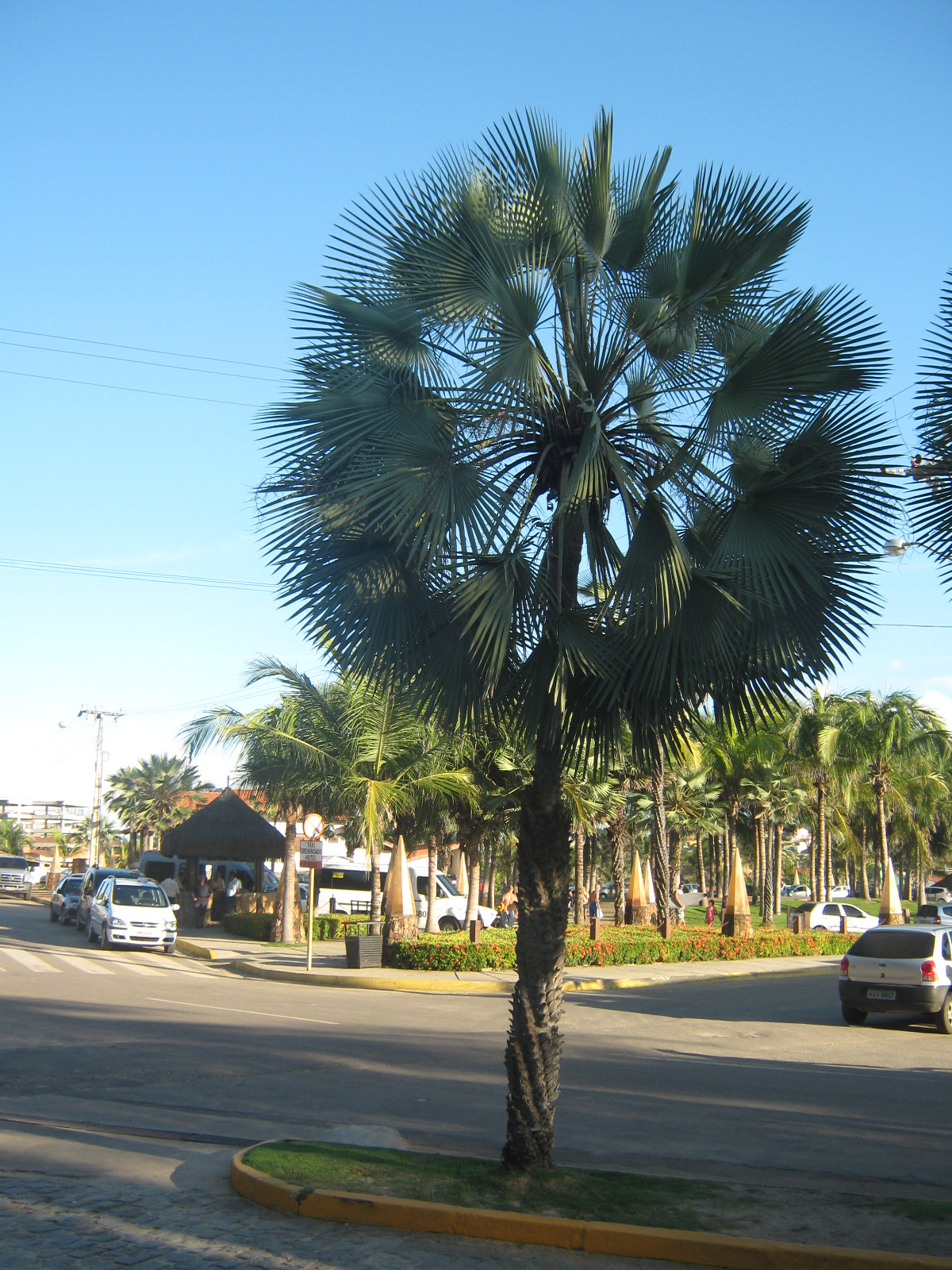

Conservation status
- Least Concern (IUCN 3.1)

Scientific classification
- Kingdom: Plantae
- Clade: Tracheophytes
- Clade: Angiosperms
- Clade: Monocots
- Clade: Commelinids
- Order: Arecales
- Family: Arecaceae
- Tribe: Trachycarpeae
- Genus: Copernicia
- Species: C. alba

Binomial name
- Copernicia alba Morong

Synonyms
- Copernicia nigra Morong; Copernicia rubra Morong; Copernicia australis Becc.; Coryphomia tectorum Rojas; Copernicia ramulosa Burret

= Copernicia alba =

Wax palm

Species of palm

Copernicia alba is a South American species of palm tree, which is found in the Humid Chaco ecoregion in Bolivia, Paraguay, Colombia, Brazil (in the states of Mato Grosso and Mato Grosso do Sul) and Argentina (especially the province of Formosa, and less abundantly towards drier areas). They often, but not always, form dense single-species woodlands. Its common names in Spanish show the various colours (and technical qualities) that the trunk takes according to its environment: palma blanca, palma negra, palma colorada ("white", "black", and "red" palm, respectively). In Guaraní, it is called caranday, "water palm". Its English trade name is wax palm or caranday wax palm (it belongs to the same genus as the Carnauba wax palm).

== Description ==
C. alba can reach 25 m in height and 40 cm in girth. The trunk is cylindrical, rarely bifurcated, and has a grayish trunk with a smooth surface in adult specimens. The leaves are persistent, grouped at the apex of the trunk, and measuring between 40 and 70 cm. The inflorescence is almost 2 m long; the flowers are hermaphroditic, about 4 mm long, with a tubular yellowish green corolla, and arranged in a spiral pattern. Each flower has three ovaries, of which only one develops into a globular fruit, a dark pulpous berry that contains a light-brown, 12-mm-long ovoid seed.

Young specimens have a lightweight semihard wood, which becomes hard and heavier in mature individuals, reaching a relative density up to 0.92. This wood finds its main use in telephone and electrical line poles.

== Uses ==
Ancient peoples in South America used wax palm for making candles by scraping away wax on the leaves.

In Paraguay, C. alba is currently studied for its suitability as a biodiesel oil crop.

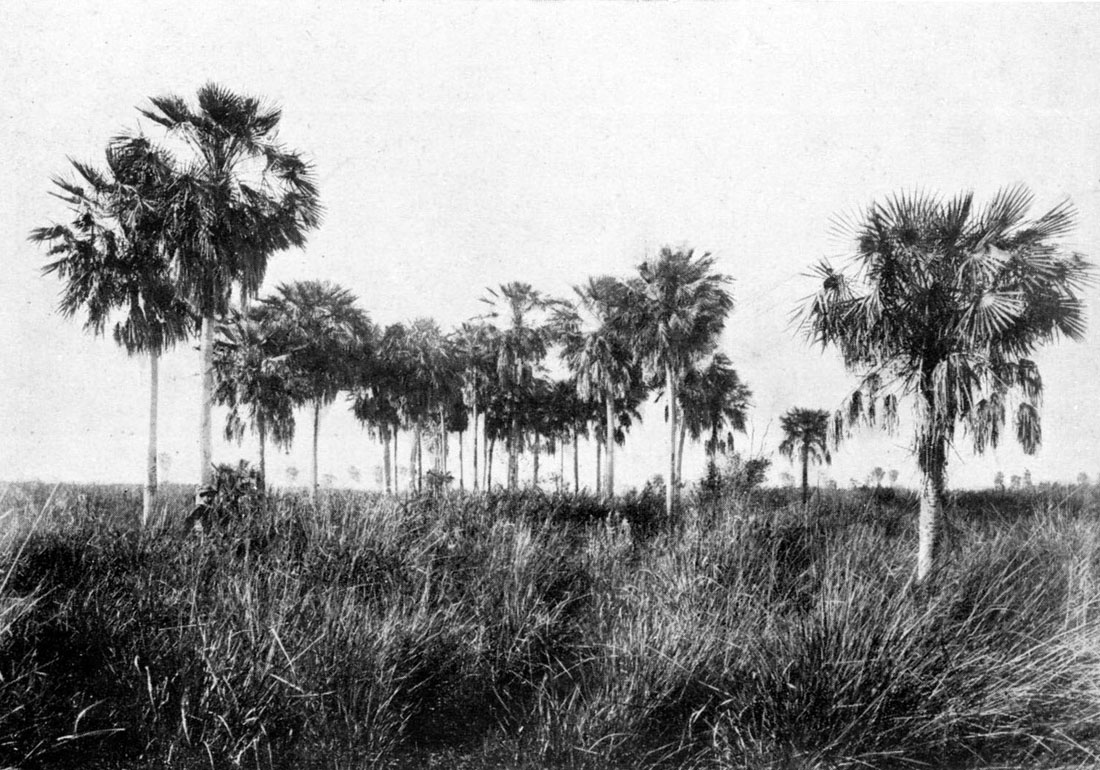
Copernicia alba in the Paraguay river basin, 1892.
