= Copernicia humicola =

Conservation status
- Data Deficient (IUCN 3.1)

Scientific classification
- Kingdom: Plantae
- Clade: Tracheophytes
- Clade: Angiosperms
- Clade: Monocots
- Clade: Commelinids
- Order: Arecales
- Family: Arecaceae
- Tribe: Trachycarpeae
- Genus: Copernicia
- Species: C. humicola

Binomial name
- Copernicia humicola León

Species of palm

Copernicia humicola is a species of flowering plant in the palm family, Arecaceae. It is endemic to Cuba.
