= Copernicia gigas =

Conservation status
- Vulnerable (IUCN 2.3)

Scientific classification
- Kingdom: Plantae
- Clade: Tracheophytes
- Clade: Angiosperms
- Clade: Monocots
- Clade: Commelinids
- Order: Arecales
- Family: Arecaceae
- Tribe: Trachycarpeae
- Genus: Copernicia
- Species: C. gigas

Binomial name
- Copernicia gigas Ekman ex Burret

Species of palm

Copernicia gigas is a palm which is endemic to eastern Cuba.

== Description ==
This striking palm features a solitary trunk that can grow up to 20 meters tall and reach a diameter of 50 centimeters. In its younger stages, the trunk remains covered with persistent petiole bases, while the older sections become smooth with a grayish coloration. The petioles are armed with sharp thorns, providing a natural defense.

The large fan-shaped leaves reach impressive dimensions, displaying a green upper surface and a waxy gray coating underneath. They are marginally costapalmate, with segments radiating outward in a semi-folded manner. The inflorescence, which arises between the leaves, can extend up to 3 meters in length. It is arched and ramified, stretching above the crown and carrying whitish bisexual flowers.

As the flowering phase transitions to fruiting, the palm produces globose fruits, each measuring 2 centimeters in diameter. When ripe, these fruits turn black and serve as a food source for wildlife, aiding in seed dispersal.
