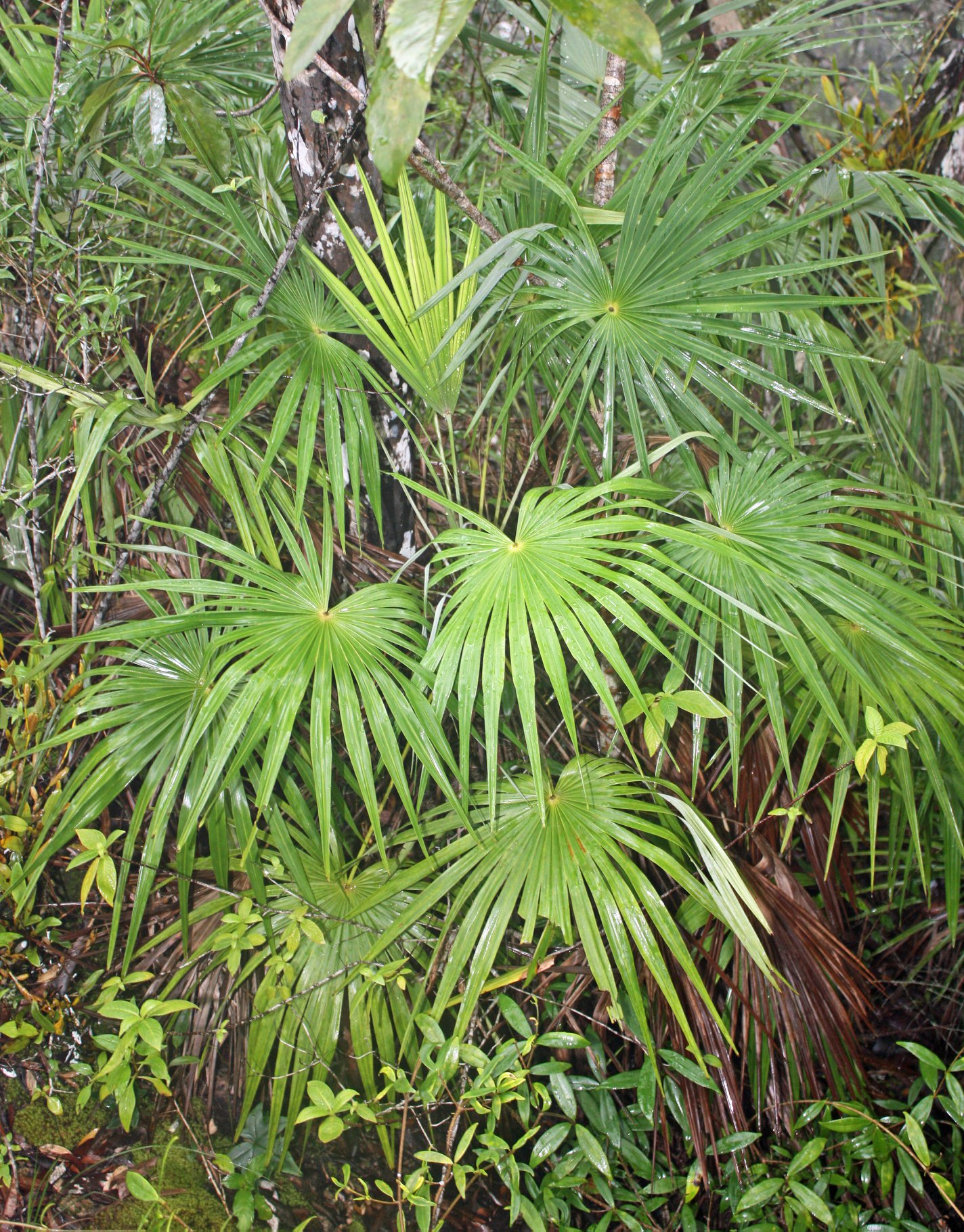
- Maxburretia furtadoana in habit, Thailand

Scientific classification
- Kingdom: Plantae
- Clade: Tracheophytes
- Clade: Angiosperms
- Clade: Monocots
- Clade: Commelinids
- Order: Arecales
- Family: Arecaceae
- Subfamily: Coryphoideae
- Tribe: Trachycarpeae
- Genus: Maxburretia; Furtado

Synonyms
- Liberbaileya Furtado; Symphyogyne Burret

= Maxburretia =

Genus of palms

Maxburretia is a genus of three rare species of palms found in southern Thailand and Peninsular Malaysia. The genus is named in honor of Max Burret, (1883–1964) a German botanist.

- Maxburretia furtadoana J.Dransf. – southern Thailand
- Maxburretia gracilis (Burret) J.Dransf – southern Thailand, Langkawi Islands
- Maxburretia rupicola (Ridl.) Furtado – Selangor
