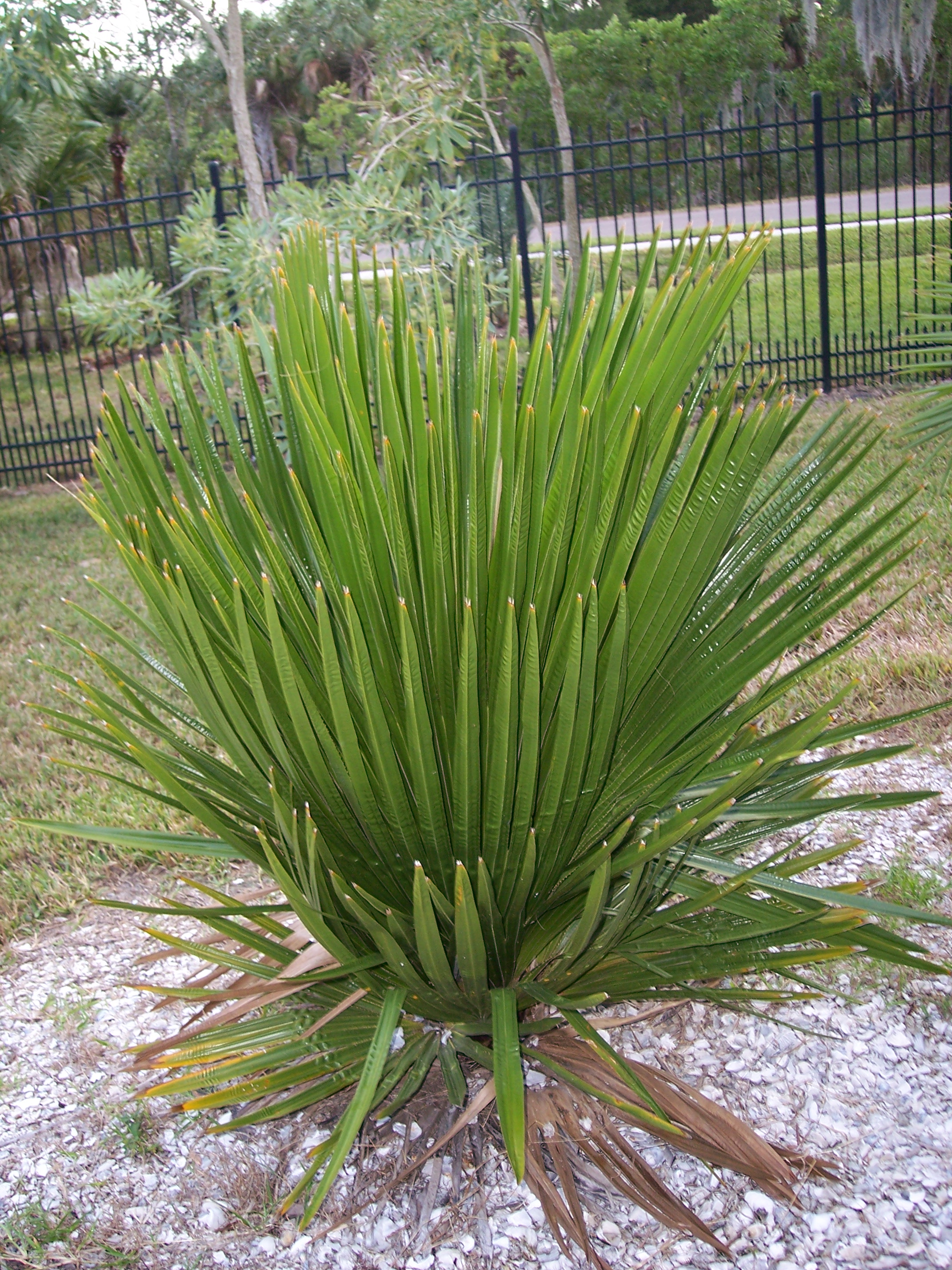

Scientific classification
- Kingdom: Plantae
- Clade: Tracheophytes
- Clade: Angiosperms
- Clade: Monocots
- Clade: Commelinids
- Order: Arecales
- Family: Arecaceae
- Tribe: Trachycarpeae
- Genus: Copernicia
- Species: C. macroglossa

Binomial name
- Copernicia macroglossa H.Wendl. ex Becc.

= Copernicia macroglossa =

Species of palm

Copernicia macroglossa (also known as the Petticoat palm, Jata palm, and Jata de Guanabacoa), is a species of palm endemic to western and central Cuba.

== Range and biodiversity ==
It is endemic to Cuba and thrives on the serpentine soil of most of the Cuban provinces, such as La Habana, Las Villas, and Pinar del Río.

However, this tree has been successfully cultivated within some parts of Central America and some Caribbean islands.

== Description ==
Copernicia macroglossa obtained its scientific name from the famous astronomer, Copernicus who proposed the sun was the center of the universe centuries ago. The plant itself has become the center of attention for many gardeners around the globe for its magnificent "petticoat" and its majestic structure.

The plant has been known to grow on some impoverished soils that contain the necessary nutrients, natural populations are found within the unique serpentine soils of Cuba.

This palm is extremely drought tolerant and grows best with complete sunlight, with blazing heat and humid conditions. It has a single trunk that can grow to be 8 inches in diameter and over 30 feet high. This palm has upright fan-shaped leaves that grow in a spiral formation along the top of the trunk. From the bottom upper stem, a beard like structure made out of dry fan shaped leaves extend to cover approximately half the trunk which is (the "petticoat"). The function of the petticoat is unknown.

Copernicia macroglossa is a monoecious palm, with hermaphroditic flowers. The white flowers are followed by 1-inch black fruits that are usually oval in shape.

== Ecology ==
Late in the summer, the small fruits ripen to a dark black color that attracts many birds and bats which act as the main dispersers for the palms seeds.

Bats and birds have been observed to visit the bottom of the petticoat before fruit ripening but the scientific reasons for this remains unknown. The plant is crossed pollinated or pollinated by another plant since the palm is dioecious with pollinators such as insects and wind.

== Human cultivation and uses ==
This plant is sought after by many gardeners for the aesthetic properties that are provided by its unique petticoat. Moreover, the brightness of the leaves and spaces between them provide a light reflection which adds to its beauty.

It can grow in open subtropical and tropical spaces with well drained soils where it can receive full sunlight.

In subtropical areas prone to frost, the plant may be damaged due to its low tolerance of cold weather. Moreover, the plant grows relatively slowly, which could be a challenge for many gardeners and cultivators.

Because of its appealing appearance and slow growth, a mature specimen has a great commercial value. One 20–30 ft palm in good condition can cost around $200-$300.
