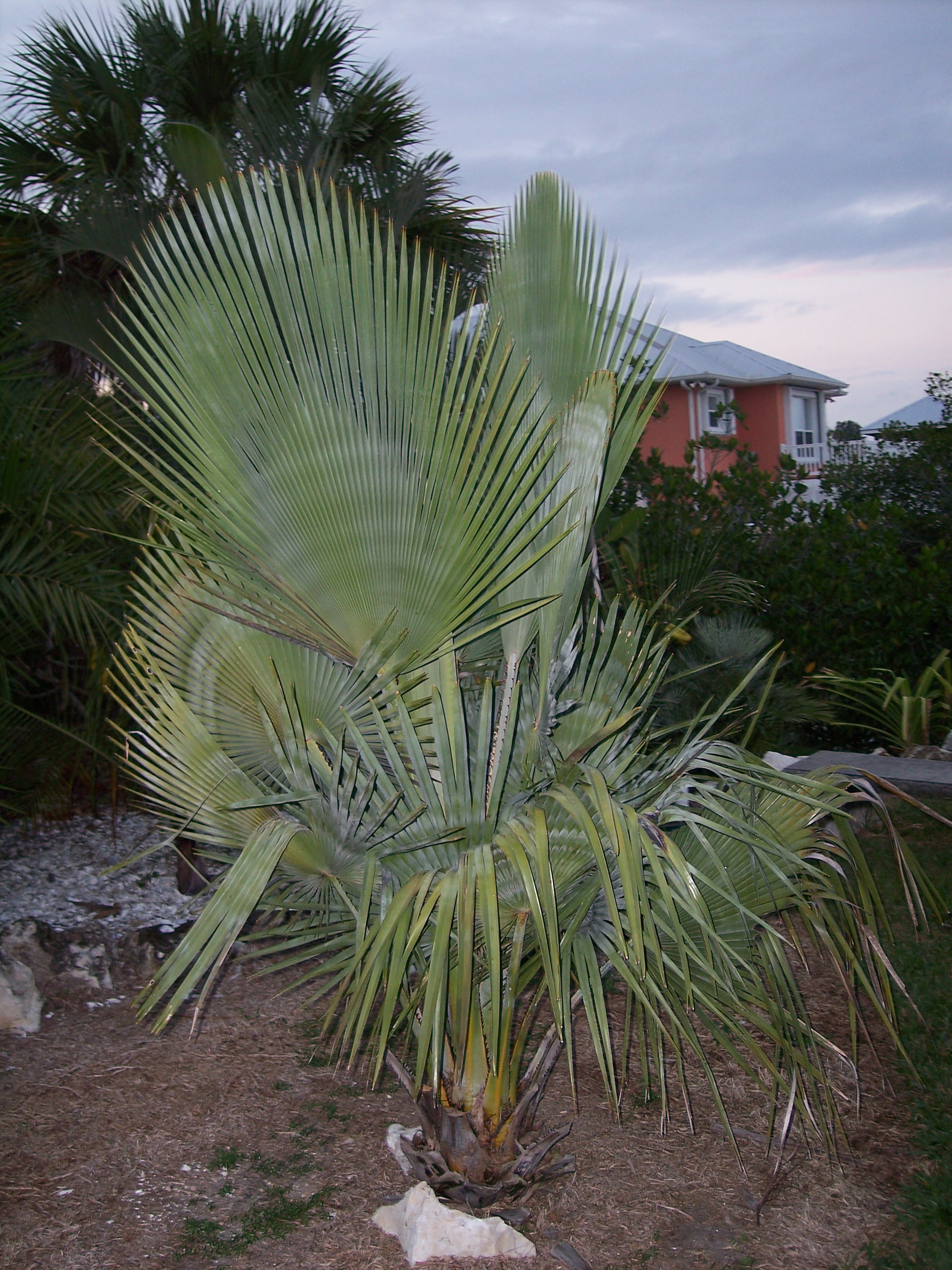

Conservation status
- Least Concern (IUCN 3.1)

Scientific classification
- Kingdom: Plantae
- Clade: Tracheophytes
- Clade: Angiosperms
- Clade: Monocots
- Clade: Commelinids
- Order: Arecales
- Family: Arecaceae
- Tribe: Trachycarpeae
- Genus: Copernicia
- Species: C. baileyana

Binomial name
- Copernicia baileyana León

Synonyms
- Copernicia baileyana f. bifida León; Copernicia baileyana var. laciniosa León

= Copernicia baileyana =

Species of palm

Copernicia baileyana is a species of flowering plant in the palm family Arecaceae. It is sometimes referred to by the common name yarey and it is endemic to eastern and central Cuba. Like other members of this genus, C. baileyana is a fan palm. Trees are 10 to 20 metres tall with stems 40 (to 60) centimetres in diameter and are sometimes swollen. The fruit is black, 1.8 to 2.3 centimetres long and 1.8 to 2 cm in diameter.

The leaves are used for weaving hats, baskets and other items. They are also used for thatch.
