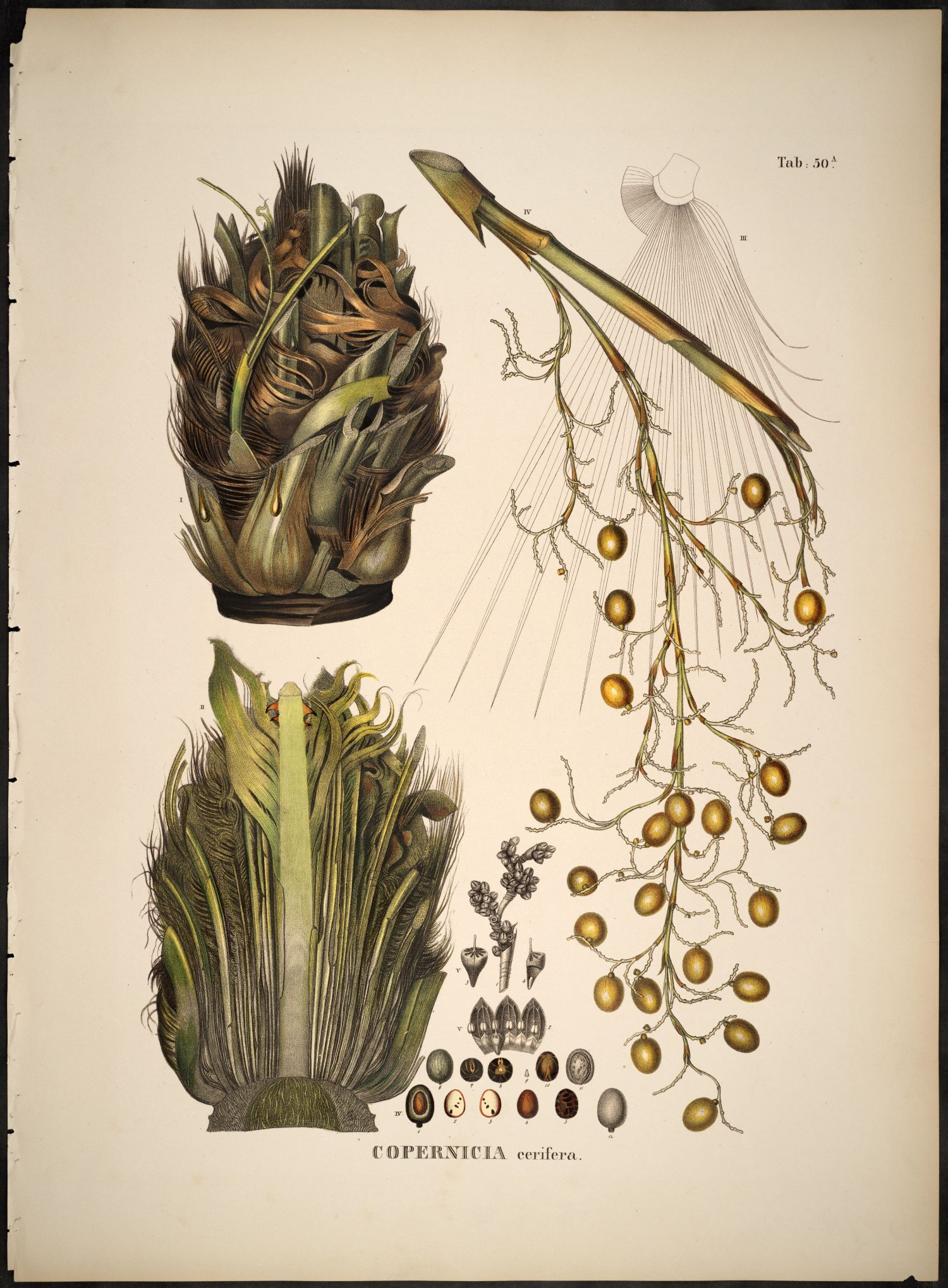
- Copernica ceifera

Scientific classification
- Kingdom: Plantae
- Clade: Embryophytes
- Clade: Tracheophytes
- Clade: Spermatophytes
- Clade: Angiosperms
- Clade: Monocots
- Clade: Commelinids
- Order: Arecales
- Family: Arecaceae
- Subfamily: Coryphoideae
- Tribe: Trachycarpeae
- Genus: Copernicia; Mart.

Synonyms
- Arrudaria Macedo; Coryphomia Rojas Acosta

= Copernicia =

Genus of palms

Copernicia is a genus of palms native to South America and the Greater Antilles. Of the known species and nothospecies (hybrids), 22 of the 27 are endemic to Cuba. They are fan palms (Arecaceae tribe Corypheae), with the leaves with a bare petiole terminating in a rounded fan of numerous leaflets. The species are small to medium-sized trees growing to 5–30 m tall, typically occurring close to streams and rivers in savanna habitats. The genus is named after the astronomer Nicolaus Copernicus. In some of the species, the leaves are coated with a thin layer of wax, known as carnauba wax.

== Species and hybrids ==
Copernicia species and hybrids are as follows.

Image	Scientific name	Distribution
	Copernicia alba Morong	Bolivia, Argentina, Paraguay, Mato Grosso, Mato Grosso Sul
	Copernicia baileyana León	Cuba
	Copernicia berteroana Becc.	Hispaniola
	Copernicia brittonorum León	Cuba
	Copernicia cowellii Britton & P.Wilson	Camagüey Province in Cuba
	Copernicia curbeloi León	Cuba
	Copernicia curtissii Becc.	Cuba
	Copernicia ekmanii Burret	Haiti
	Copernicia fallaensis León	Cuba
	Copernicia gigas Ekman ex Burret	Cuba
	Copernicia glabrescens H.Wendl. ex Becc	Cuba
	Copernicia hospita Mart.	Cuba
	Copernicia humicola León	Cuba
	Copernicia longiglossa León	Cuba
	Copernicia macroglossa Schaedtler	Cuba
	Copernicia molinetii León	Cuba
	Copernicia prunifera (Mill.) H.E.Moore	northeastern Brazil
	Copernicia rigida Britton & P.Wilson	Cuba
	Copernicia roigii León	Cuba
	Copernicia tectorum (Kunth) Mart.	Colombia, Venezuela
	Copernicia yarey Burret	Cuba

=== Natural hybrids ===
Image	Scientific name	Parentage	Distribution
	Copernicia × burretiana León	C. hospita × C. macroglossa	Cuba
	Copernicia × occidentalis León	C. brittonanum × C. hospita	Cuba
	Copernicia × textilis León	C. baileyana × C. hospita	Cuba
	Copernicia × vespertilionum León	C. gigas × C. rigida	Cuba
	Copernicia × shaferi Dahlgren & Glassman	C. cowellii × C. hospita	Cuba
	Copernicia × sueroana León	C. hospita × C. rigida	Cuba
