= Percy Wilson (botanist) =

American botanist

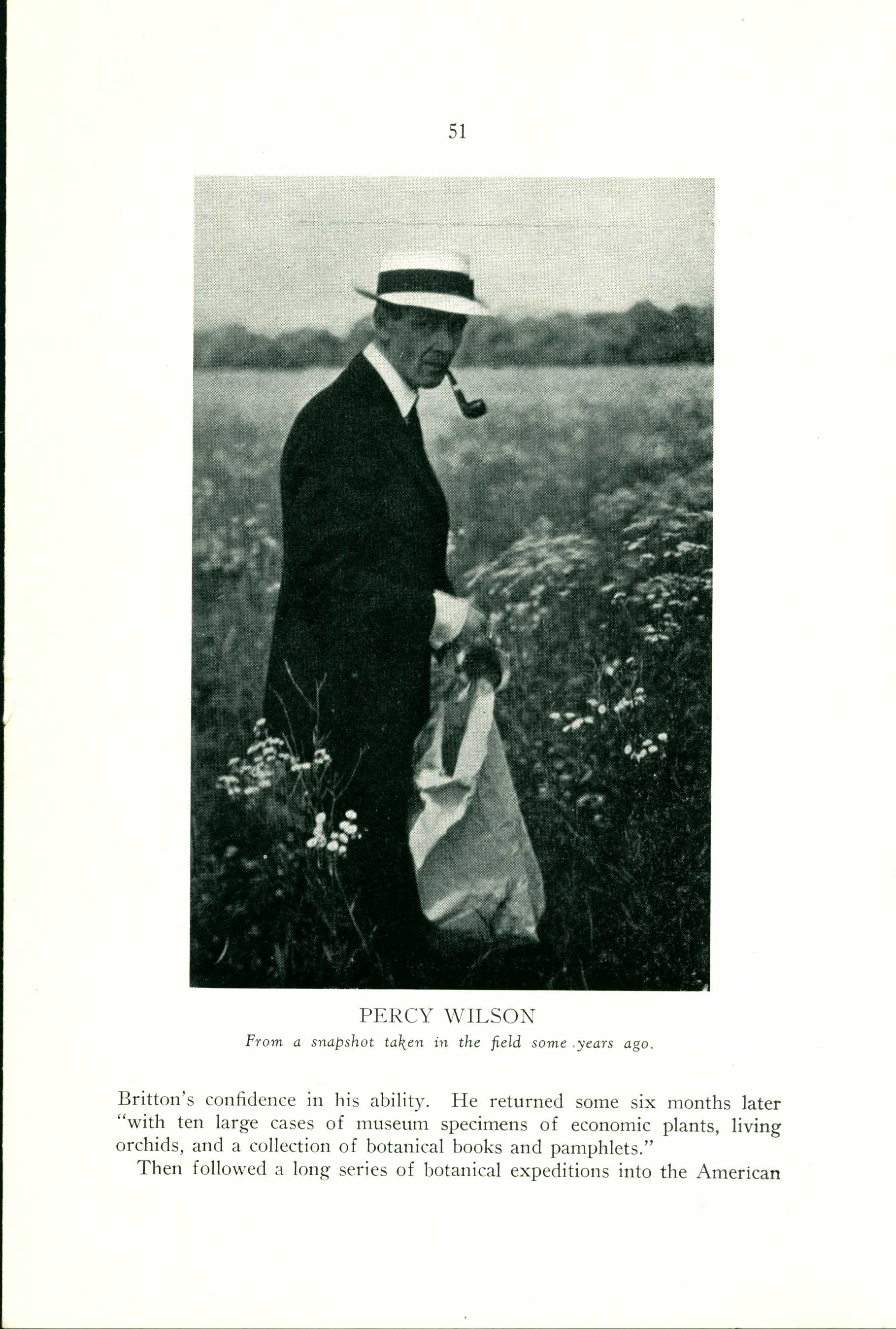
Photo from March 1944 issue of Journal of The New York Botanical Garden

Percy Wilson (1879–1944) was an American botanist.

He joined the New York Botanical Gardens (NYBG) as a museum aide. He traveled to Singapore and the Dutch East Indies in 1910, collecting various specimens – the first official NYBG-sponsored trip to the Asia-Pacific region. Wilson then became the assistant to Nathaniel Lord Britton, the NYBG Director-in-Chief. In 1914 Wilson became an Associate Curator.

In 1917, Wilson authored The Vegetation of Vieques Island.

The standard author abbreviation P.Wilson is used to indicate this person as the author when citing a botanical name.
