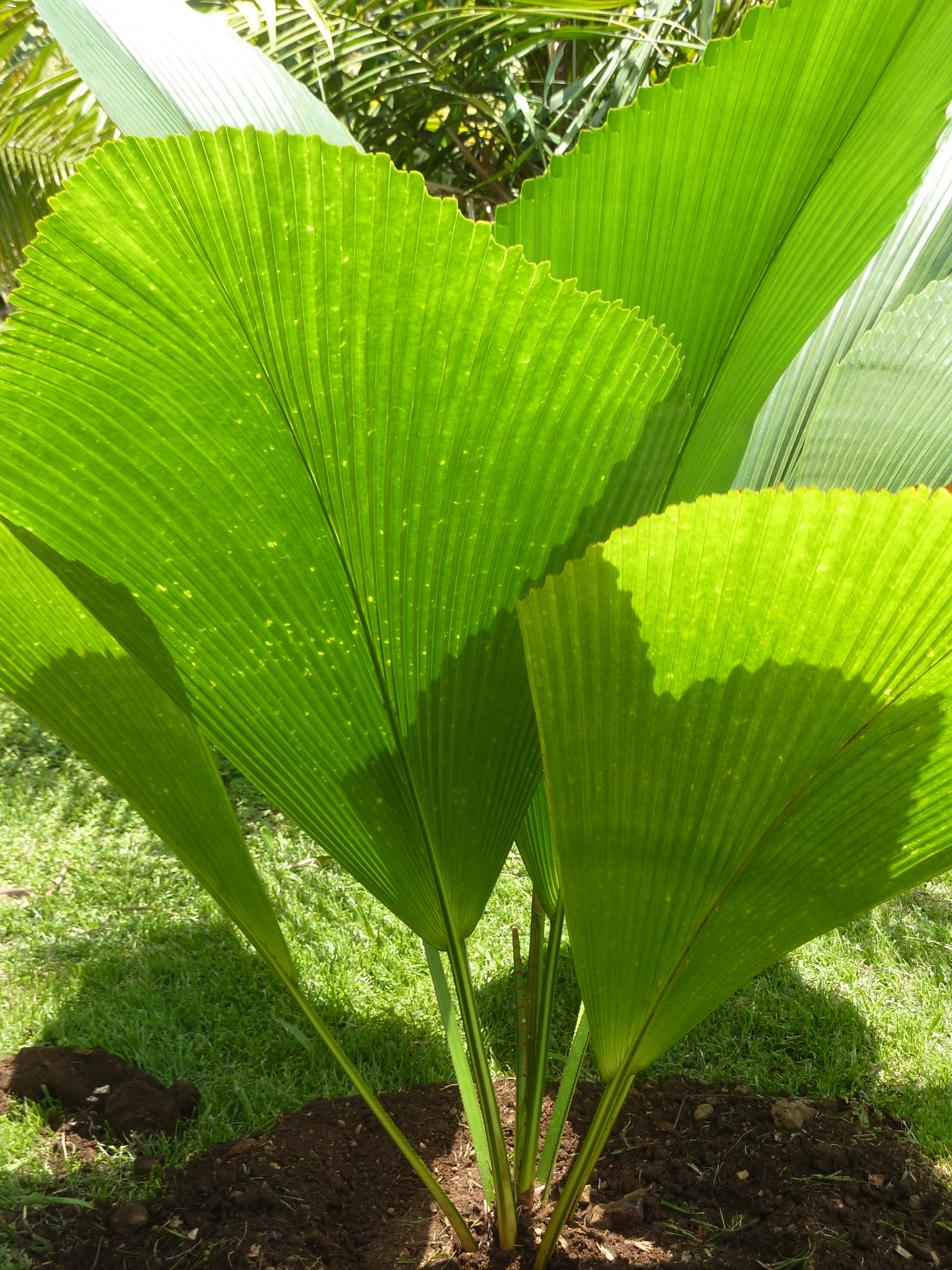
- Johannesteijsmannia altifrons

Scientific classification
- Kingdom: Plantae
- Clade: Tracheophytes
- Clade: Angiosperms
- Clade: Monocots
- Clade: Commelinids
- Order: Arecales
- Family: Arecaceae
- Subfamily: Coryphoideae
- Tribe: Trachycarpeae; Satake

Type genus
- Trachycarpus H.Wendl.

Genera
- Acoelorraphe H.Wendl. Brahea Mart. ex Endl. Chamaerops L. Colpothrinax Griseb. & H.Wendl. Copernicia Mart. ex Endl. Guihaia J.Dransf., S.K. Lee & F.N. Wei; Johannesteijsmannia H.E. Moore; Lanonia A.J. Hend. & C.D. Bacon; Licuala Wurmb; Livistona R.Br. Maxburretia Furtado; Pholidocarpus Blume; Pritchardia Seem. & H.Wendl. ex H.Wendl. Rhapidophyllum H.Wendl. & Drude; Rhapis L.f. ex Aiton; Saribus Blume; Serenoa Benth. & Hook.f; Trachycarpus H.Wendl. Washingtonia H.Wendl.

= Trachycarpeae =

Tribe of palms

Trachycarpeae is a tribe of palms in subfamily Coryphoideae of the plant family Arecaceae. It has the widest distribution of any tribe in Coryphoideae and is found on all continents (except Antarctica), though the greatest concentration of species is in Southeast Asia. Trachycarpeae includes palms from both tropical and subtropical zones; the northernmost naturally occurring palm is a member of this tribe (Chamaerops humilis). Several genera can be found in cultivation in temperate areas, for example species of Trachycarpus, Chamaerops, Rhapidophyllum and Washingtonia.

== Description ==
Palms in this tribe have palmate leaves with induplicate folds (reduplicate in Guihaia). Plants may be tall, single-stemmed trees (e.g. Copernicia, Brahea, Pritchardia), acaulescent with short, squat trunks (e.g. Maxburretia, Johannesteijsmannia), multi-stemmed (e.g. Rhapis, Acoelorraphe) or branched and prostrate (e.g. Serenoa). These palms flower regularly throughout their lives (pleonanthic) and may be dioecious, monoecious or hermaphroditic.

== Taxonomy ==
Trachycarpeae is one of eight tribes in the subfamily Coryphoideae. The tribe is monophyletic, but phylogenetic studies have yet to reveal its closest relatives, though they could be the Phoeniceae, or the Sabaleae and Cryosophileae. Initially described as tribe 'Livistoneae', the name Trachycarpeae has priority. In previous classifications, all the members of this tribe were included in tribe Corypheae.

Trachycarpeae is divided into two subtribes: Rhapidinae have flowers with three separate carpels, whereas in subtribe Livistoniinae the flower carpels are free at the base, but the styles are fused together. All genera in Rhapidinae are native to the Old World, except North American Rhapidophyllum. Livistoninae are widely distributed in both the New World and Southeast Asia and Australia. A single species (Livistona carinensis) has its main area of distribution in Africa, with Chamaerops humilis extending into northern Africa. Several genera in this tribe have yet to be allocated to a subtribe, due to a lack of convincing data from phylogenetic studies.

Rhapidinae

- Chamaerops - (1 sp., C. humilis, Mediterranean)
- Guihaia - (4 spp., China, Vietnam)
- Trachycarpus - (10 spp., Himalayas, Indochina)
- Rhapidophyllum - (1 sp., R. hystrix, Southeast USA)
- Maxburretia - (3 spp., Malay Peninsula)
- Rhapis - (11 spp., Indochina, Sumatra)

Livistoninae

- Livistona - (28 spp., Southeast Asia, Australia, NE Africa)
- Licuala - (149 spp., Southeast Asia)
- Lanonia - (19 spp., Southeast Asia)
- Johannesteijsmannia - (4 spp., Malaysia, Indonesia)
- Pholidocarpus - (6 spp., Malaysia, Indonesia)
- Saribus - (10 spp., Indo-Burma, Indonesia, Philippines)

Washingtoninae

- Acoelorraphe - (1 sp., A. wrightii, Caribbean)
- Serenoa - (1 sp., S. repens, Southeast USA)
- Brahea - (11 spp., Mexico & Guatemala)
- Colpothrinax - (3 spp., Central America & Cuba)
- Copernicia - (22 spp. incl 7 hybrid spp., Caribbean, South America)
- Pritchardia - (29 spp., Pacific Oceania)
- Washingtonia - (1 spp., W. filifera, California, Mexico)

Saribus includes species formerly in Livistona and monotypic Pritchardiopsis, while Lanonia species were previously included in Licuala.

== Gallery ==
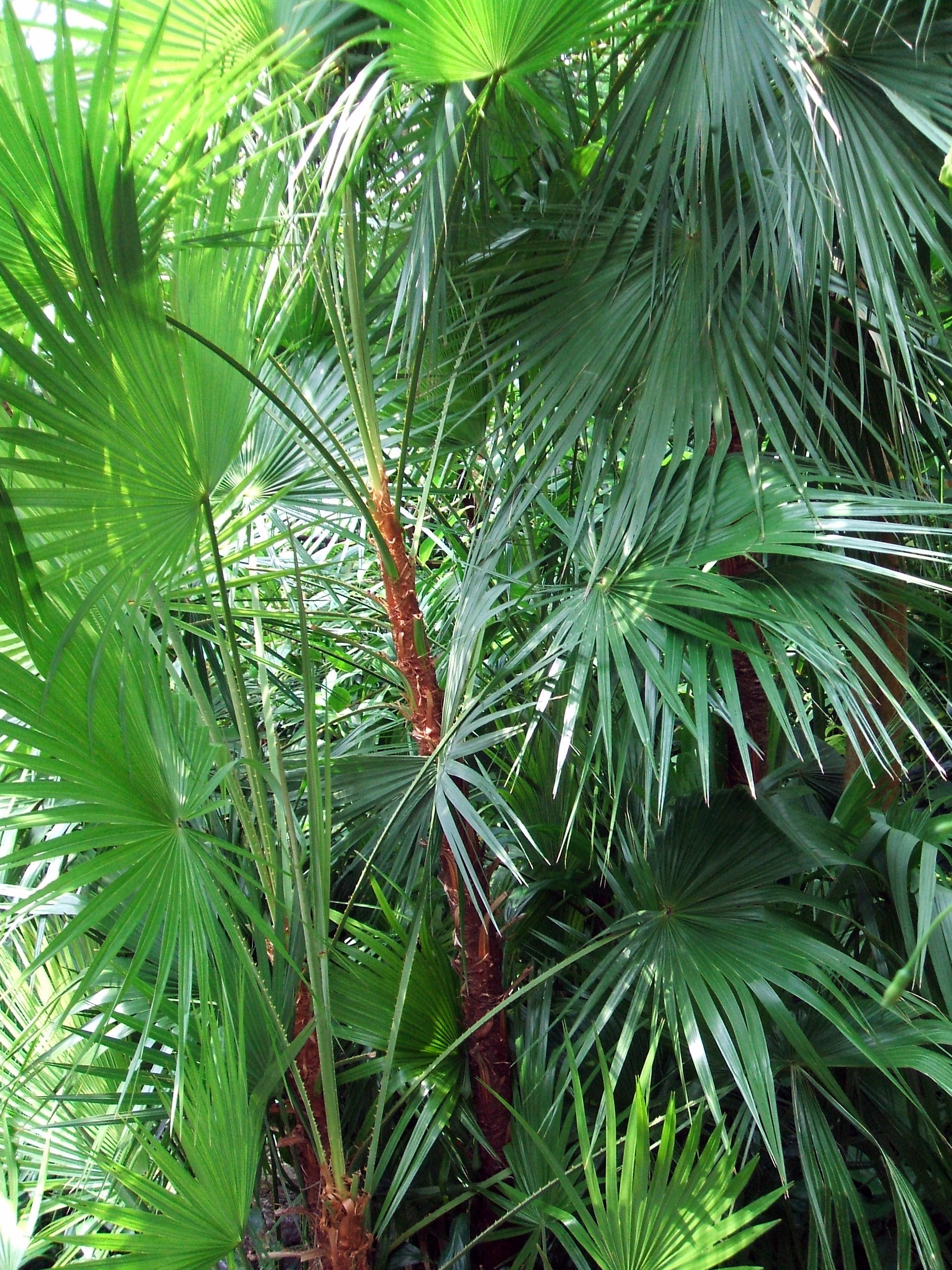
Acoelorraphe wrightii

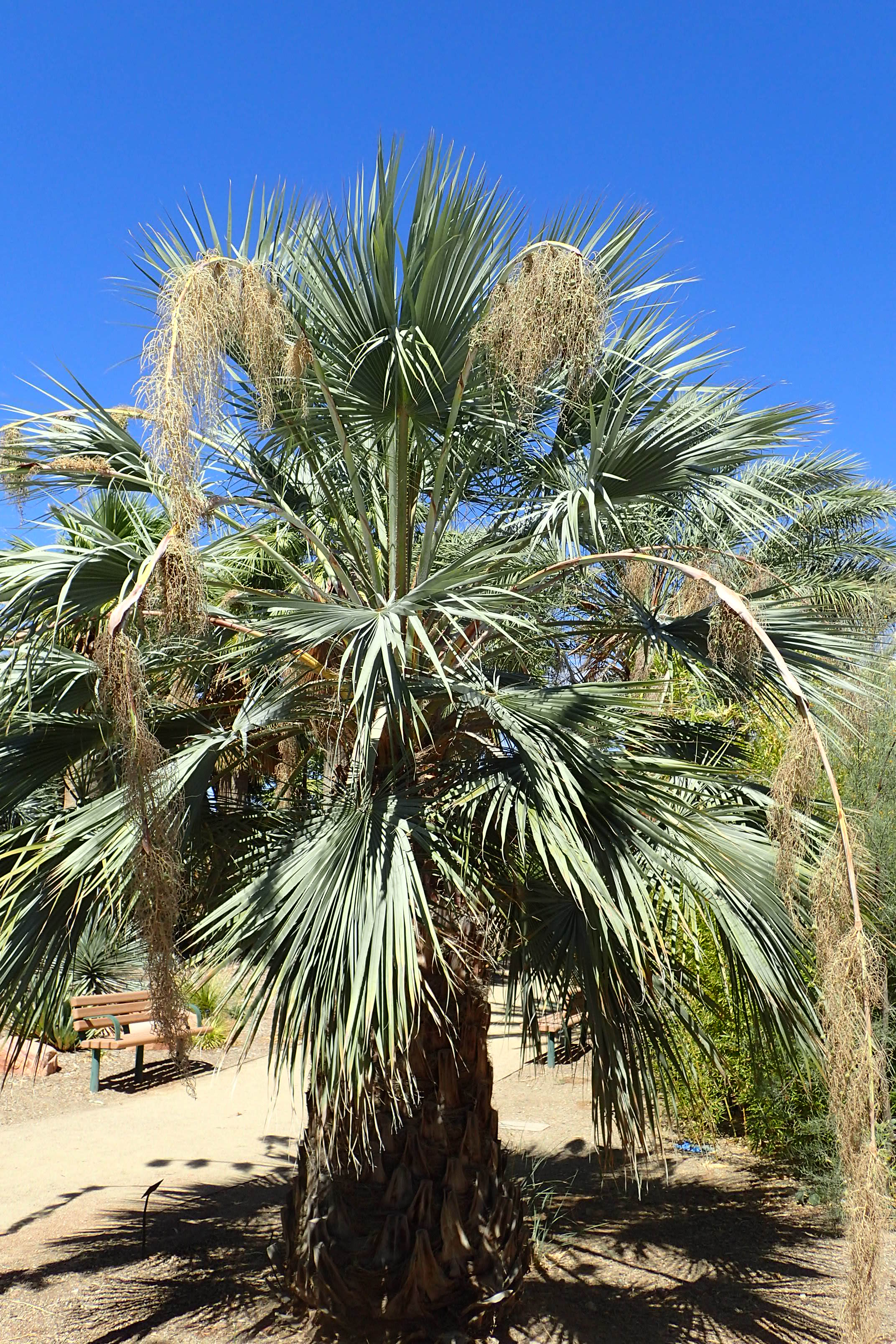
Brahea armata

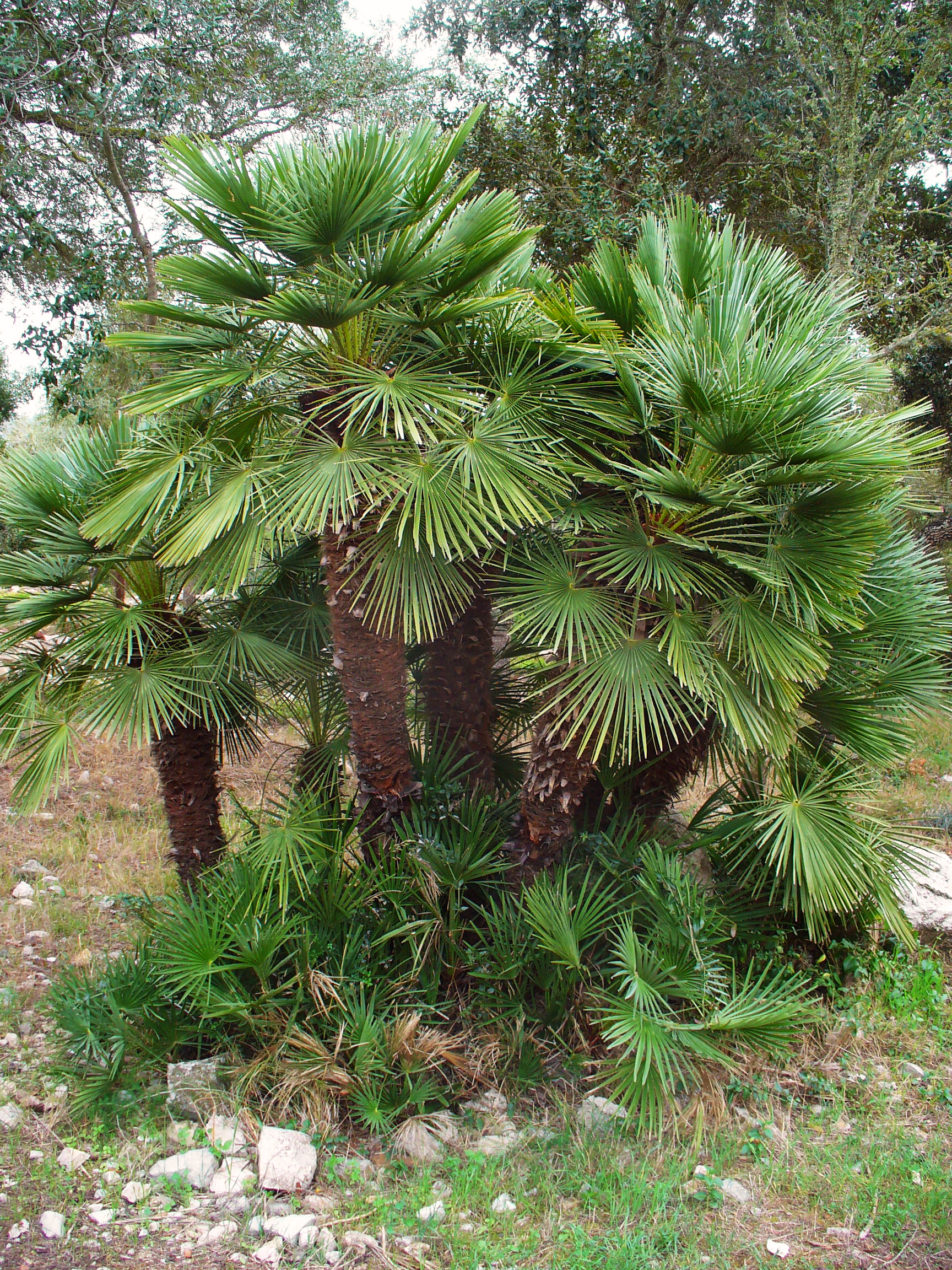
Chamaerops humilis

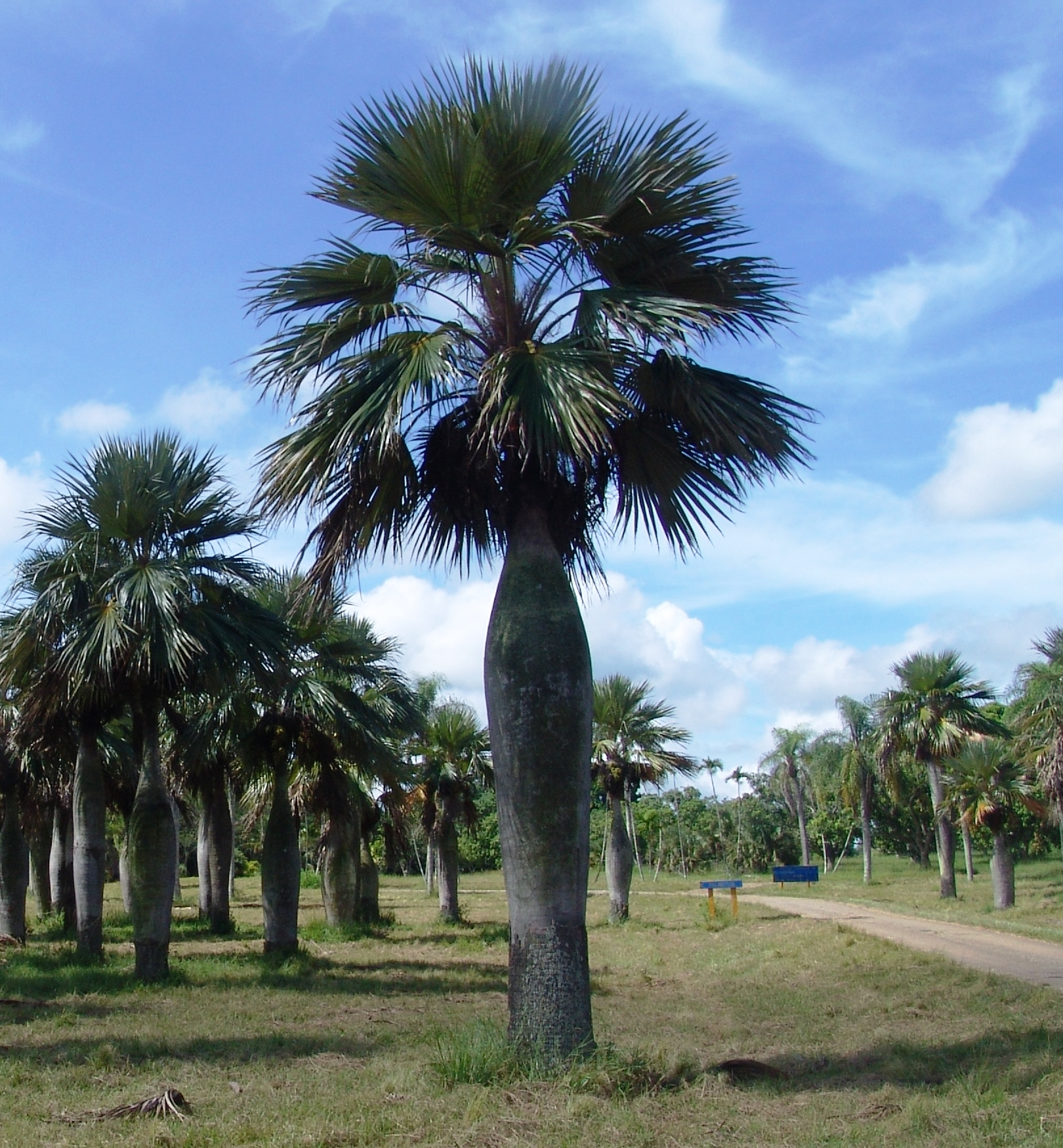
Colpothrinax wrightii

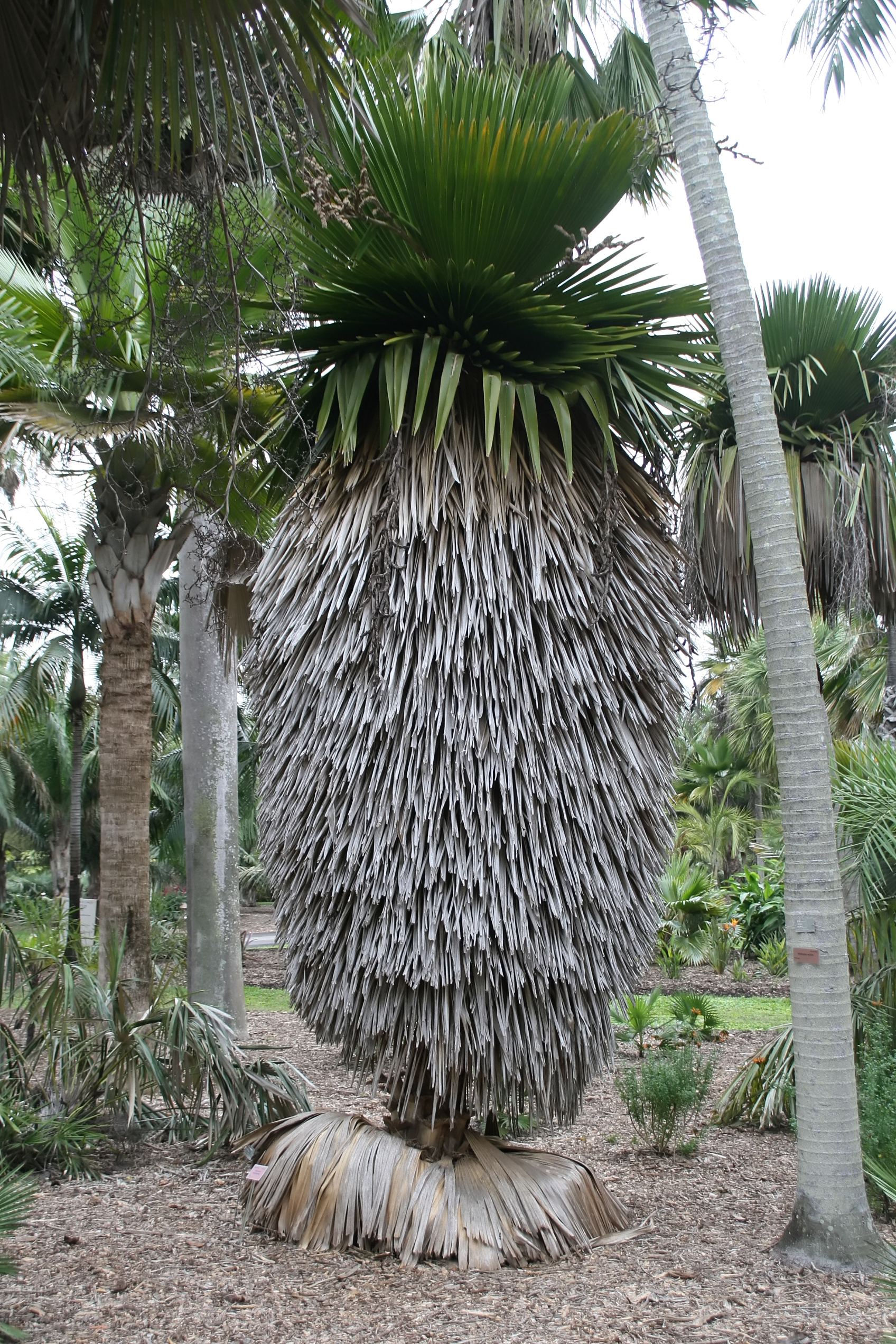
Copernicia macroglossa

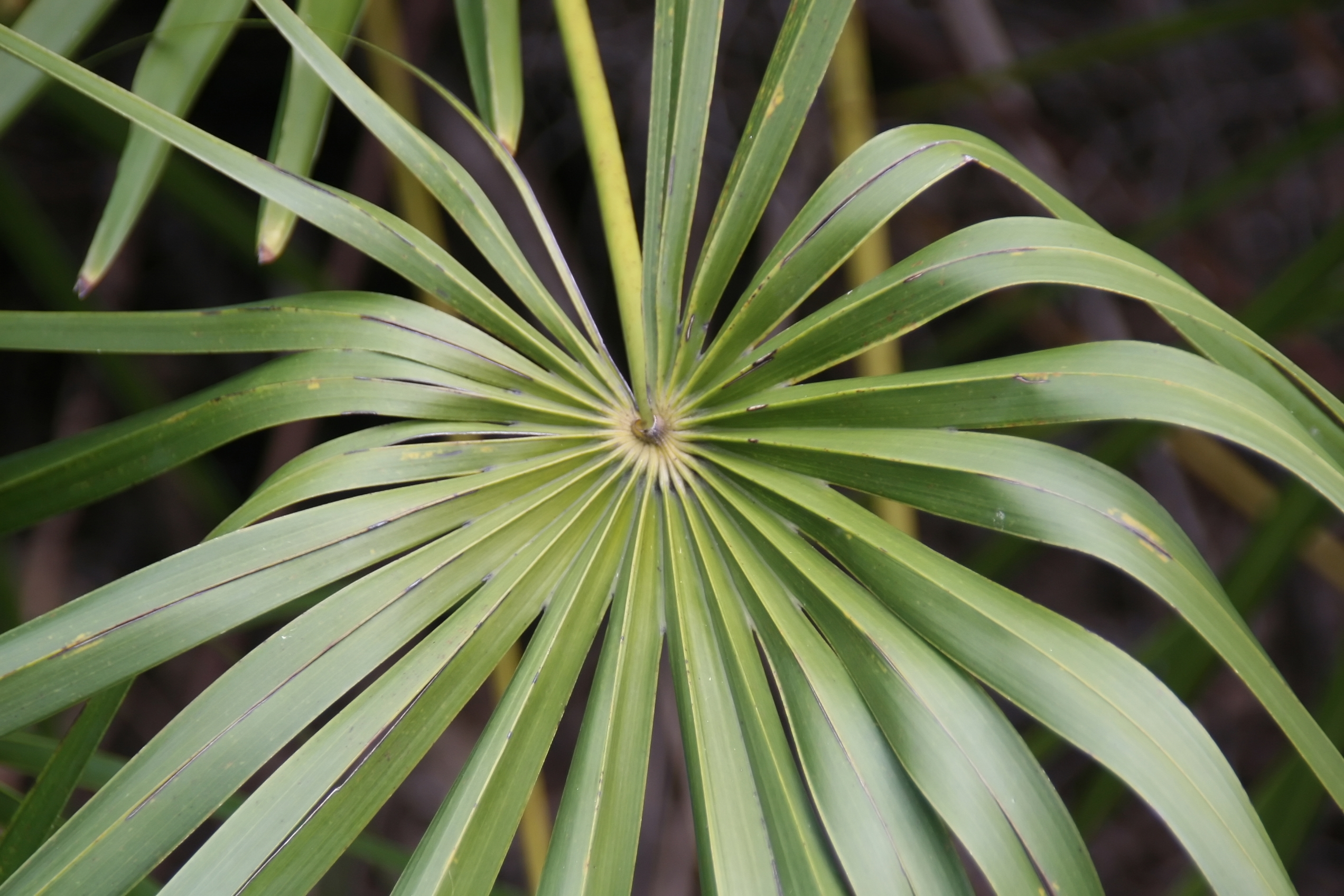
Guihaia grossefibrosa

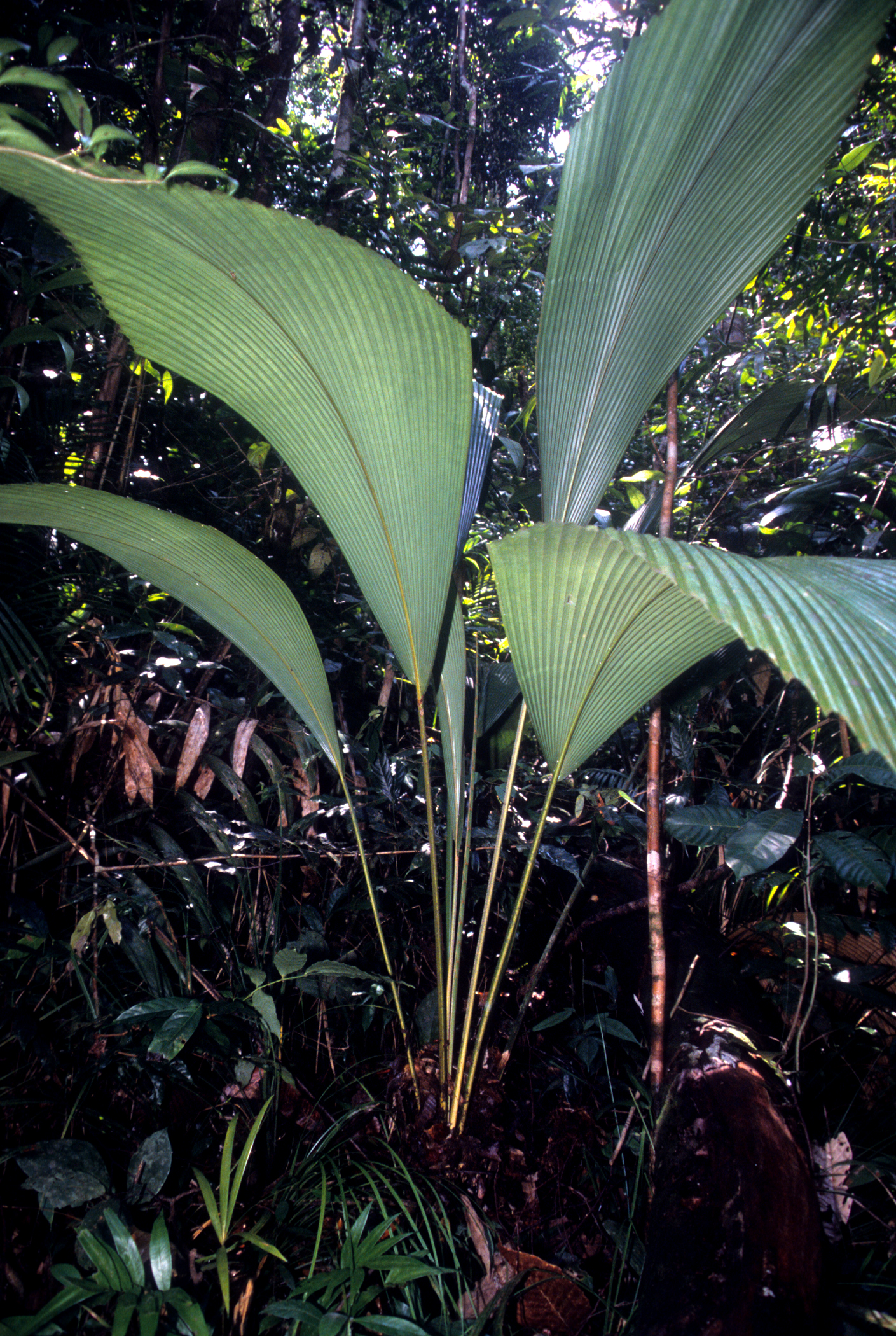
Johannesteijsmannia altifrons

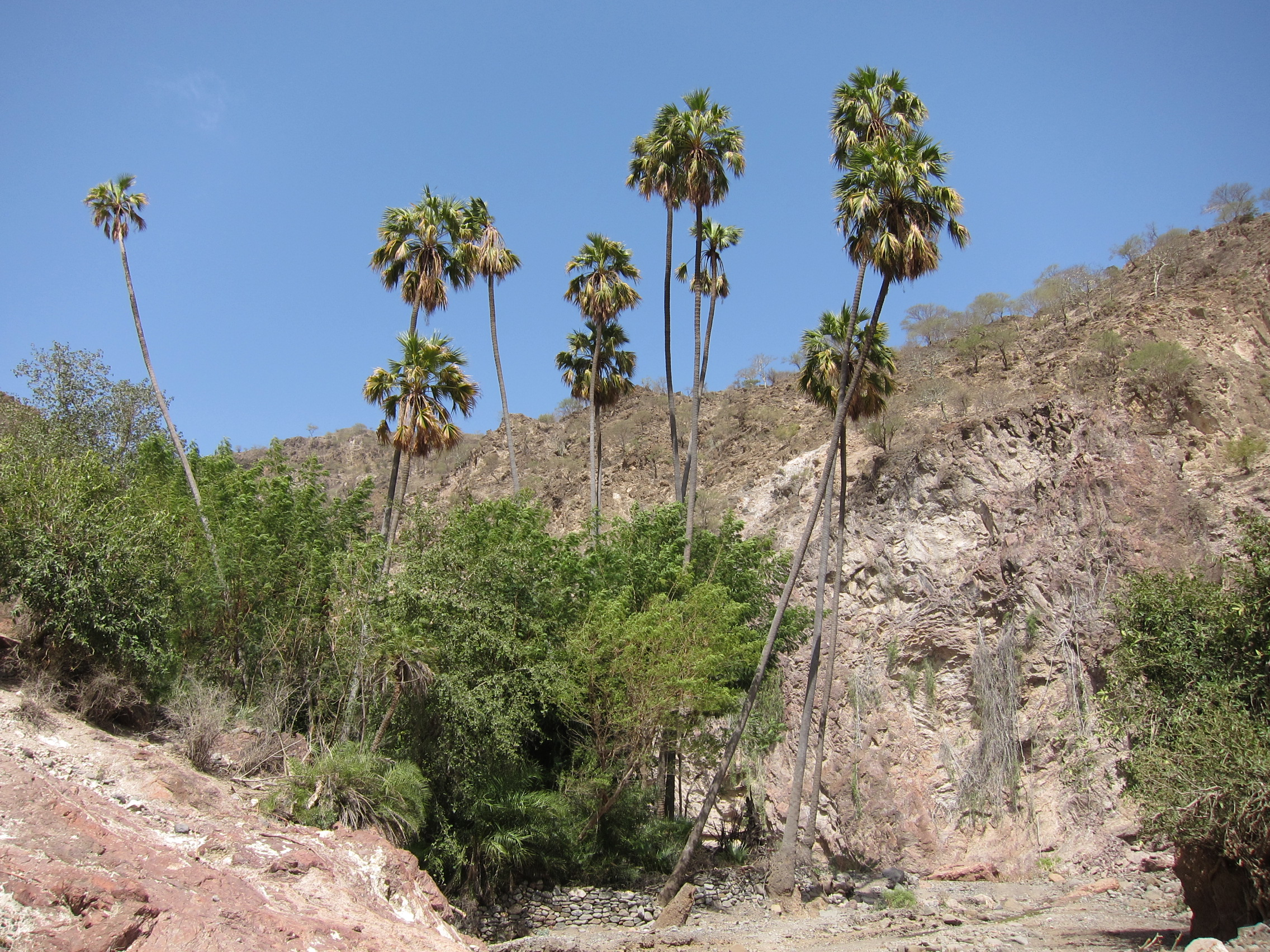
Livistona carinensis

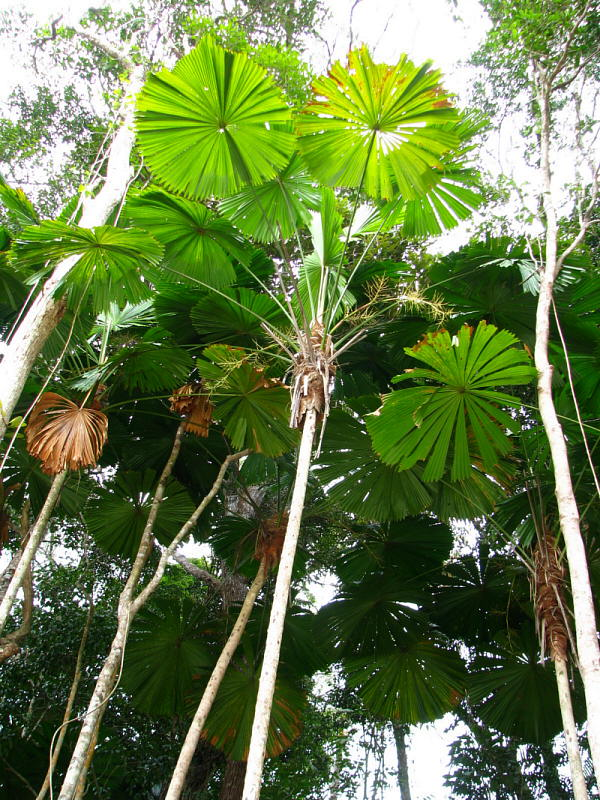
Licuala ramsayi

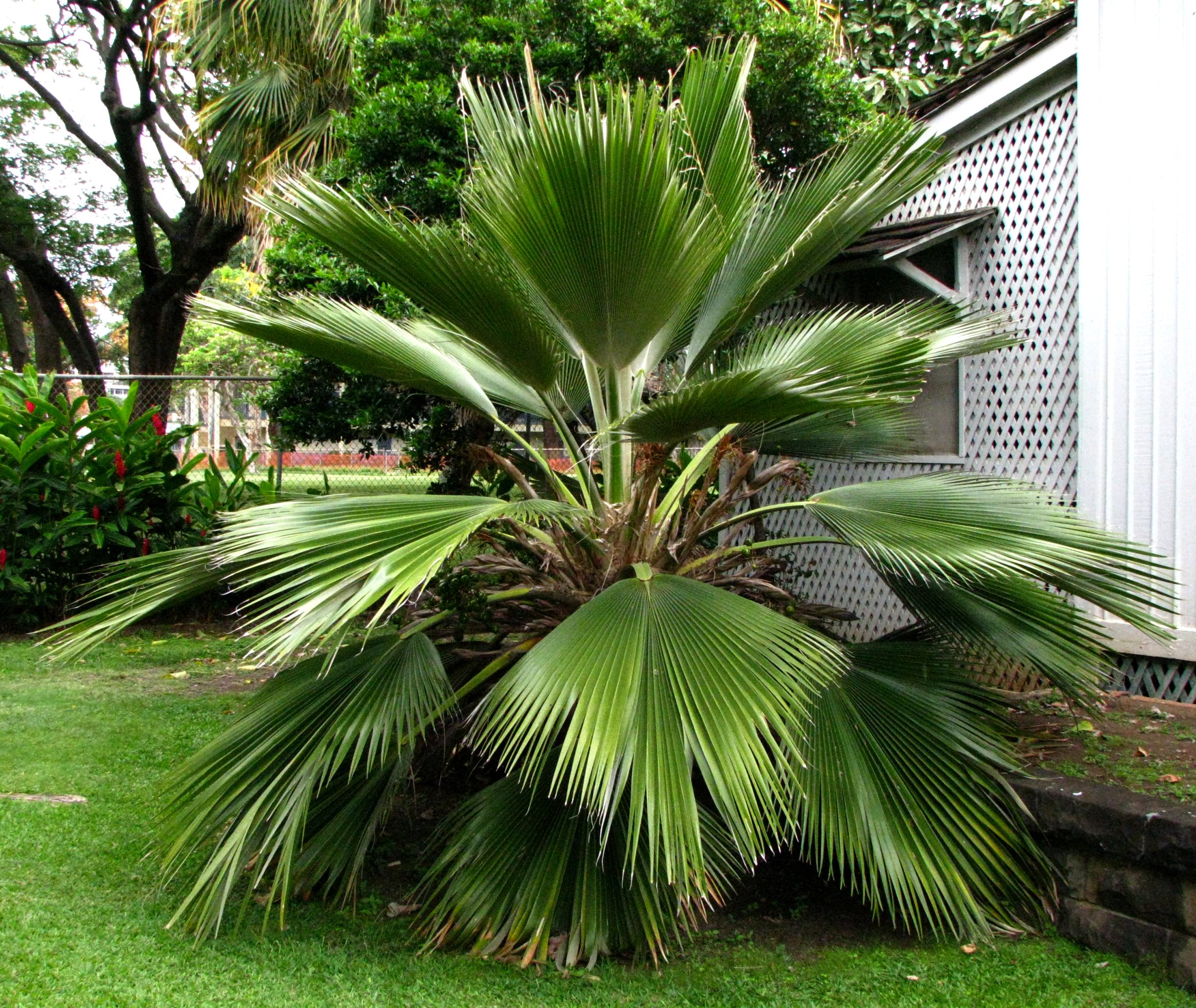
Pritchardia martii

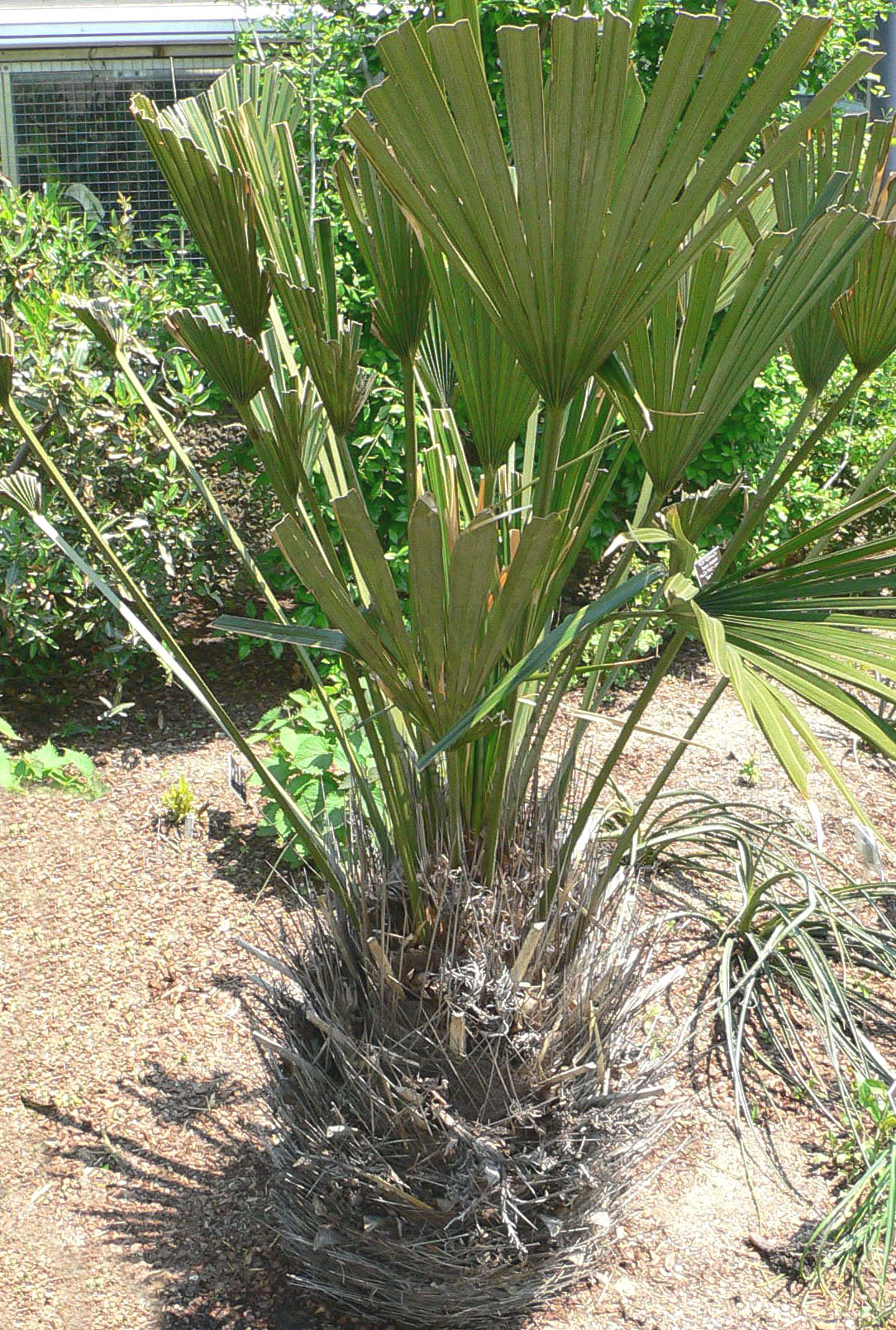
Rhapidophyllum hystrix

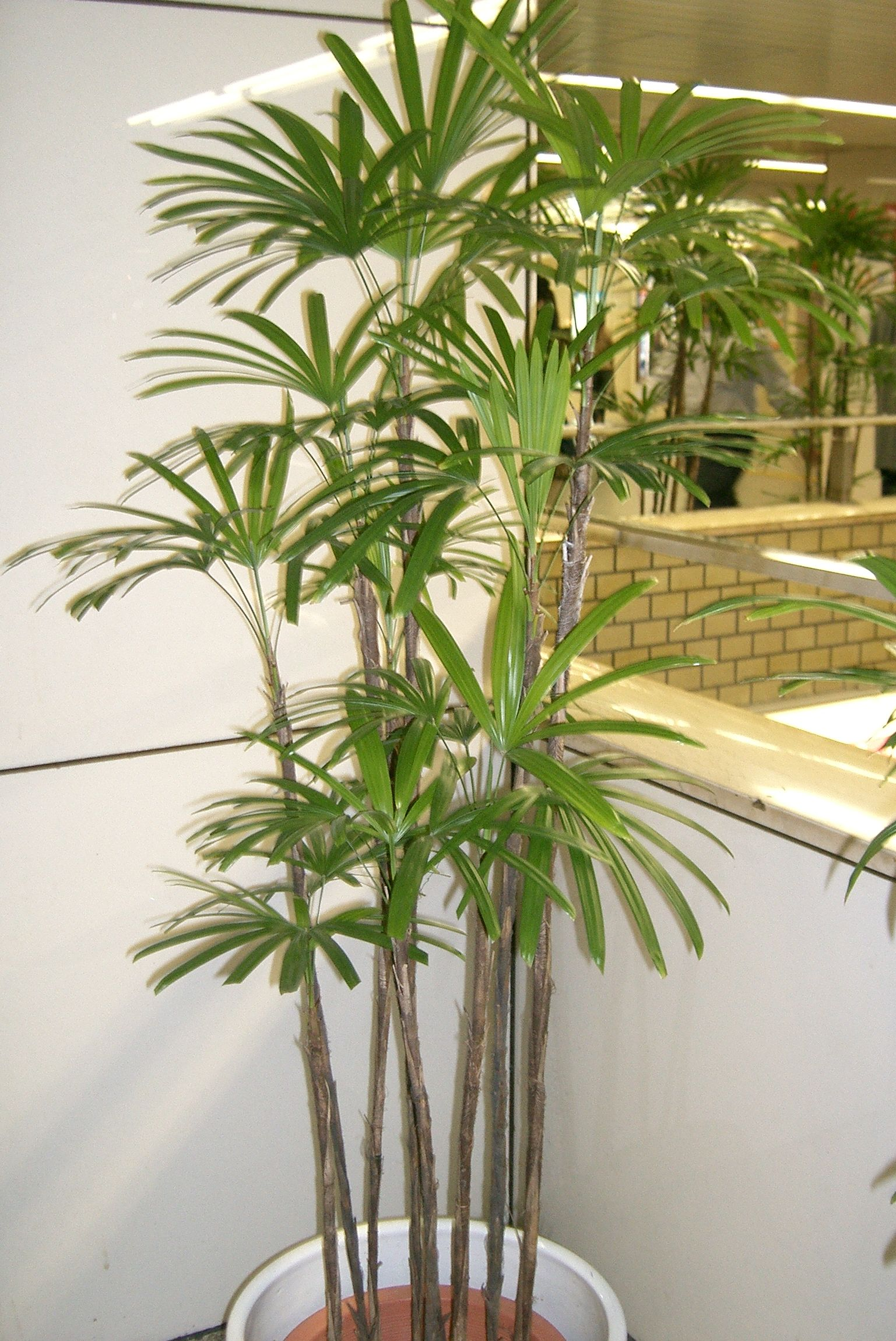
Rhapis humilis

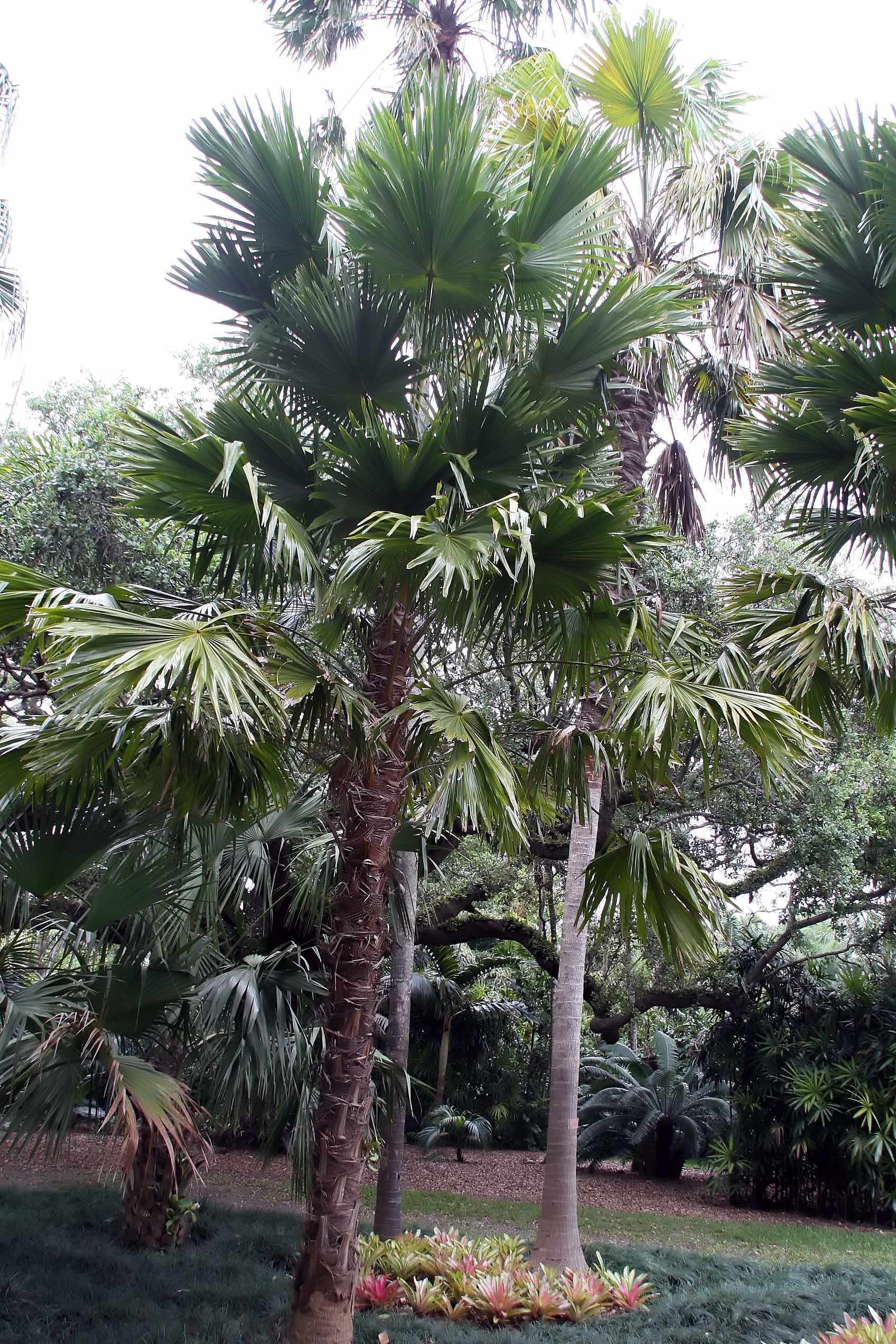
Saribus rotundifolius

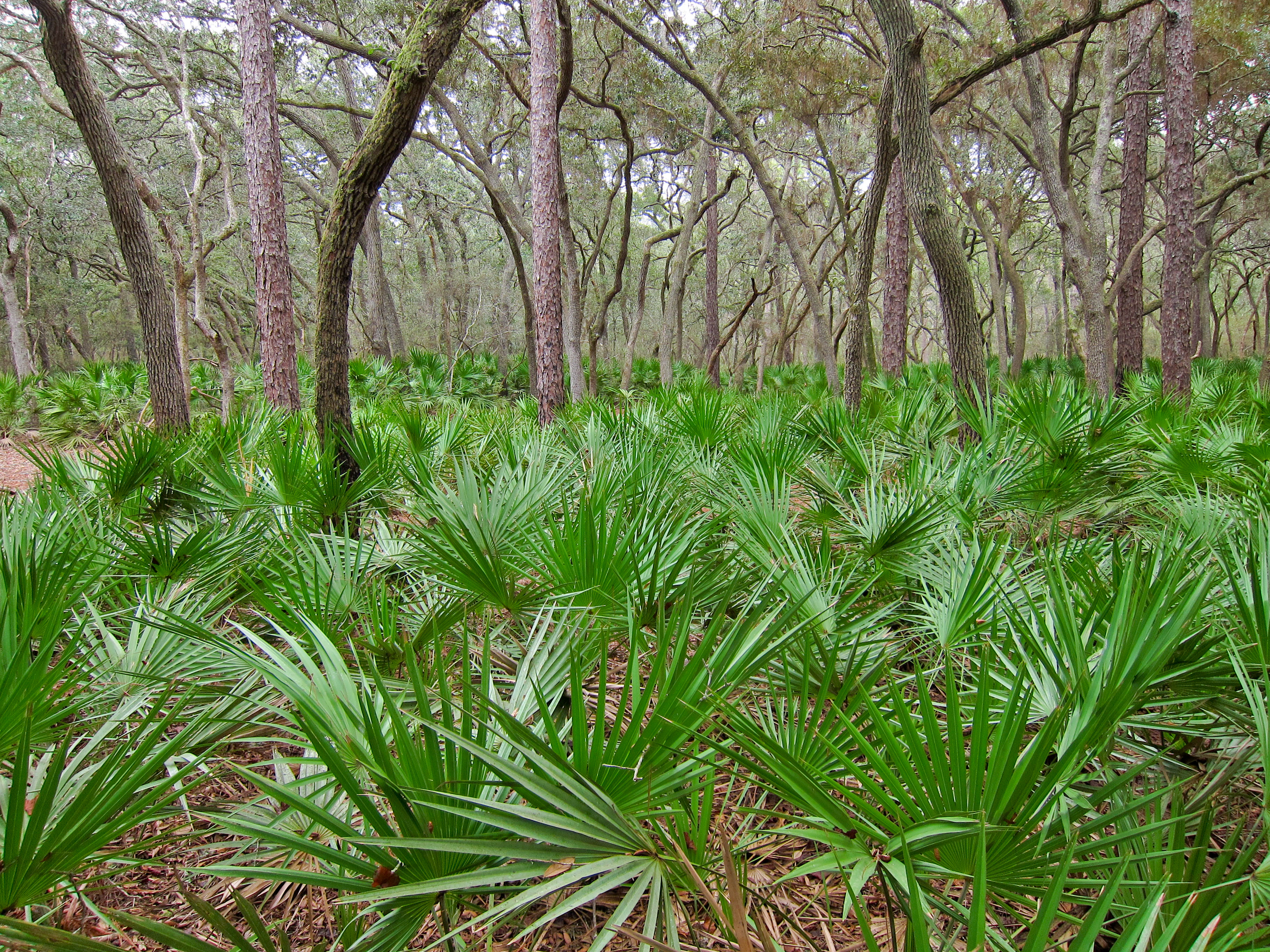
Serenoa repens

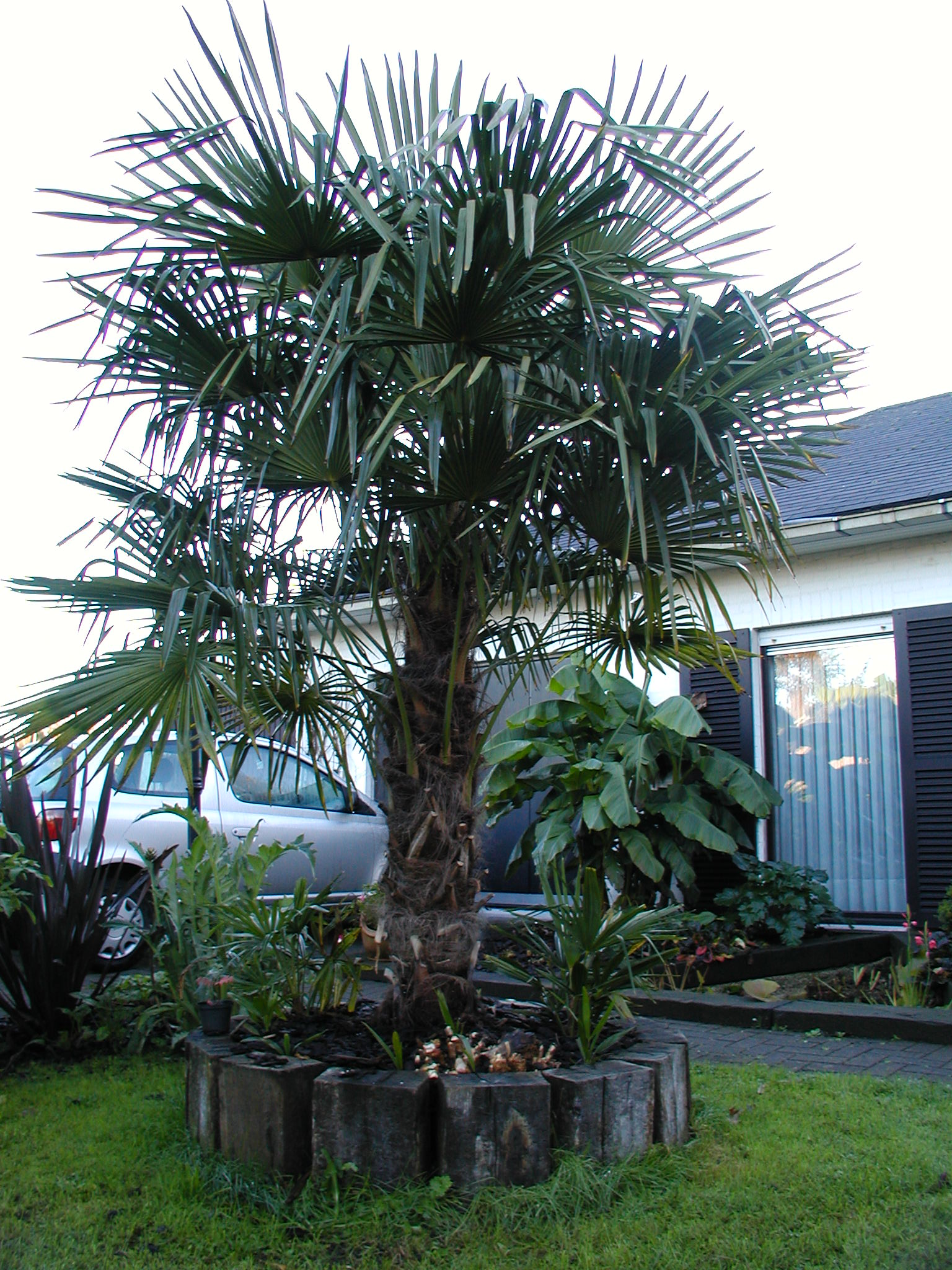
Trachycarpus fortunei

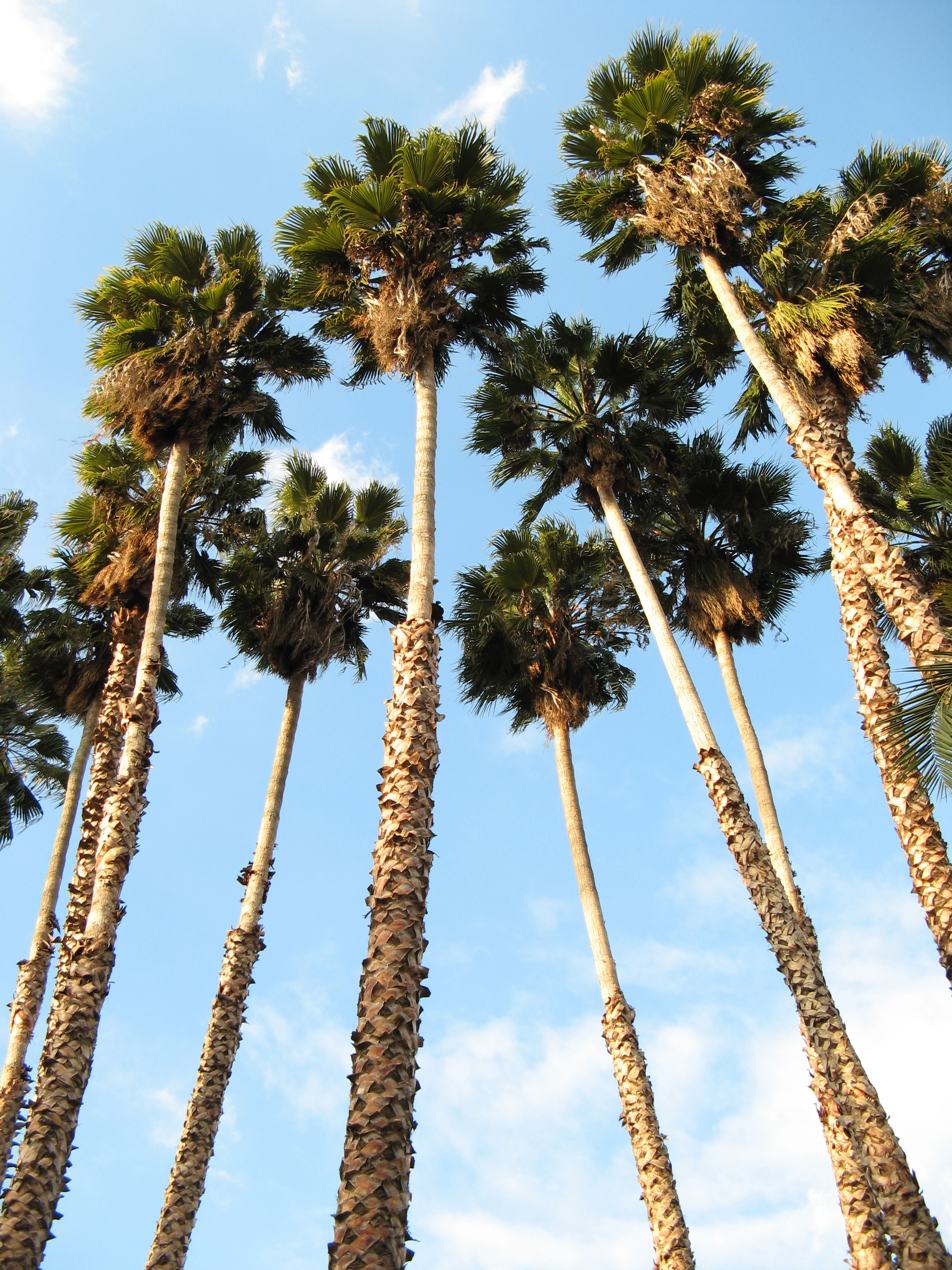
Washingtonia robusta
