= List of Coccothrinax species =

Coccothrinax is a genus of fan palms found throughout the Caribbean and in adjacent parts of southern Florida and Mexico. This list of Coccothrinax species includes accepted names according to the World Checklist of Selected Plant Families. Most species are small to medium-sized, with maximum heights between 5 and 15 metres (17 and 49 ft). Fifty-four or 55 species are recognised; only one them C. readii, is absent from the insular Caribbean. Two species, C. argentata and C. barbadensis, are widespread, while most of the others are restricted to Cuba and Hispaniola.

Andrew Henderson, Gloria Galeano and Rodrigo Bernal only recognised 14 species of Coccothrinax in their Field Guide to the Palms of the Americas while Brett Jestrow and colleagues recognised 54. The World Checklist of Selected Plant Families recognises 55 species.

- Coccothrinax acuminata Becc.
- Coccothrinax acunana León
- Coccothrinax alexandri León
  - C. alexandri subsp. alexandri
  - C. alexandri subsp. nitida (León) Borhidi & O.Muñiz,
- Coccothrinax alta (O.F.Cook) Becc.
- Coccothrinax argentata (Jacq.) L.H.Bailey Florida silver palm, Silver palm, Silver thatch palm, Biscayne palm, Palma de plata de Florida, Yuruguana de costa, Palmicha
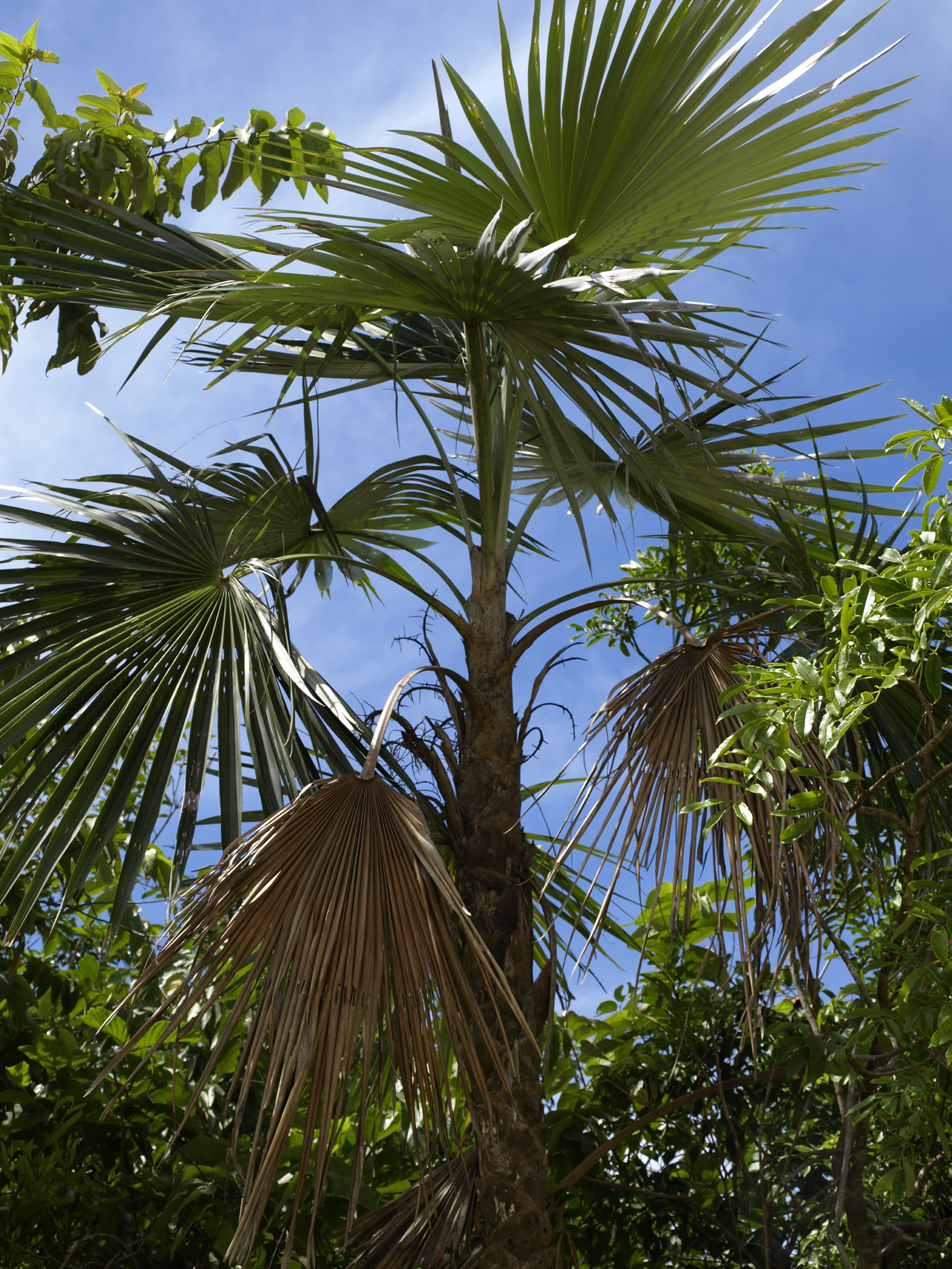
  Coccothrinax argentata
  - Coccothrinax argentata subsp. argentata
  - Coccothrinax argentata subsp. garberi (Chapm.) Zona
- Coccothrinax argentea (Lodd. ex Schult. & Schult.f.) Sarg. ex Becc. Broom palm, Hispaniolan silver palm, Silver thatch palm, Guano, Latanye maron, Latanye savanna, Palmera plateada de La Hispaniola, Guanito, Guano de escoba
- Coccothrinax baracoensis Borhidi & O.Muñiz
- Coccothrinax barbadensis Becc. Barbados silver palm, Silver palm, Thatch palm, Lesser Antilles silver thatch palm, Tyre palm, Palma de abanico
- Coccothrinax bermudezii León
- Coccothrinax borhidiana O.Muñiz Borhidi's guano palm
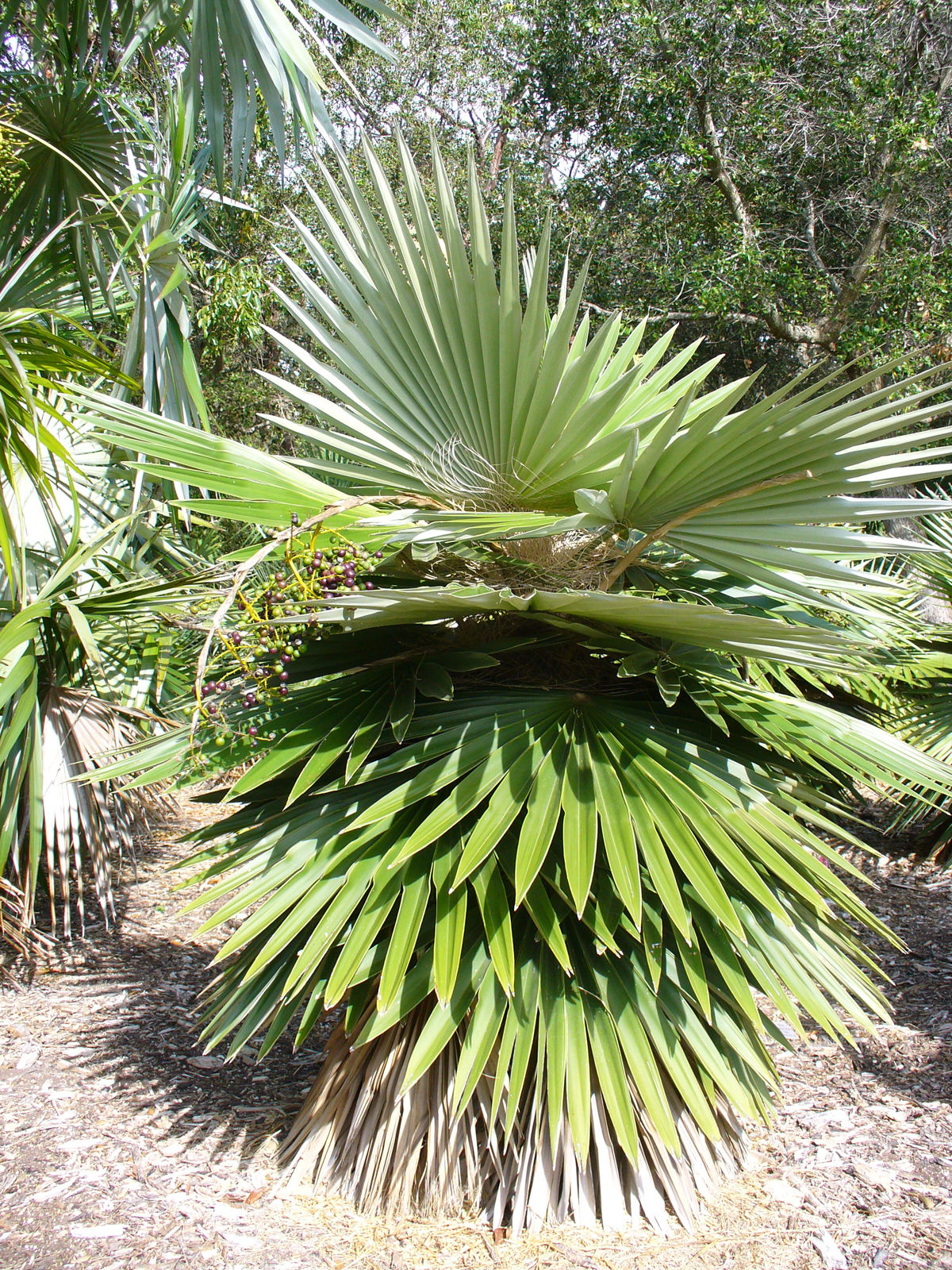
  Coccothrinax borhidiana
- Coccothrinax boschiana Mejía & R.G.García
- Coccothrinax camagueyana Borhidi & O.Muñiz
- Coccothrinax clarensis León
  - C. clarensis subsp. brevifolia (León) Borhidi & O.Muñiz
  - C. clarensis subsp. clarensis
- Coccothrinax concolor Burret
- Coccothrinax crinita Becc. (Griseb. & H.Wendl. ex C.H.Wright) Becc. Old man palm, Thatch palm, Palma petate, Guano barbudo, Guano petate
  - C. crinita subsp. brevicrinis Borhidi & O.Muñiz
  - C. crinita subsp. crinita
- Coccothrinax cupularis (León) Borhidi & O.Muñiz
- Coccothrinax ekmanii Burret Gouane palm
- Coccothrinax elegans O.Muñiz & Borhidi
- Coccothrinax fagildei Borhidi & O.Muñiz Fagilde's Palm
- Coccothrinax fragrans Burret Fragrant Cuban thatch, Yuraguana
- Coccothrinax garciana León
- Coccothrinax gracilis Burret
- Coccothrinax guantanamensis (León) O.Muñiz & Borhidi
- Coccothrinax gundlachii León Yuruguana
- Coccothrinax hioramii León
- Coccothrinax inaguensis Read
- Coccothrinax jamaicensis Read Jamaica silver thatch
- Coccothrinax jimenezii M.M.Mejía & R.G.García
- Coccothrinax leonis O.Muñiz & Borhidi
- Coccothrinax litoralis León Cuban silver palm
- Coccothrinax macroglossa (León) Borhidi & O.Muñiz
- Coccothrinax microphylla Borhidi & O.Muñiz
- Coccothrinax miraguama (Kunth) Becc. Miraguano, Miraguama, Biraguano, Yuraguano, Guanito, Miraguama palm
  - C. miraguama subsp. havanensis (León) Borhidi & O.Muñiz
  - C. miraguama subsp. miraguama
  - C. miraguama subsp. roseocarpa (León) Borhidi & O.Muñiz
- Coccothrinax moaensis (Borhidi & O.Muñiz) O.Muñiz
- Coccothrinax montana Burret
- Coccothrinax munizii Borhidi
- Coccothrinax muricata León
- Coccothrinax nipensis Borhidi] & O.Muñiz
- Coccothrinax orientalis León, O.Muñiz & Borhidi
- Coccothrinax pauciramosa Burret
- Coccothrinax proctorii Read Cayman thatch palm, Protector's thatch palm
- Coccothrinax pseudorigida León
- Coccothrinax pumila Borhidi & J.A.Hern.
- Coccothrinax readii H.J.Quero Mexican silver palm
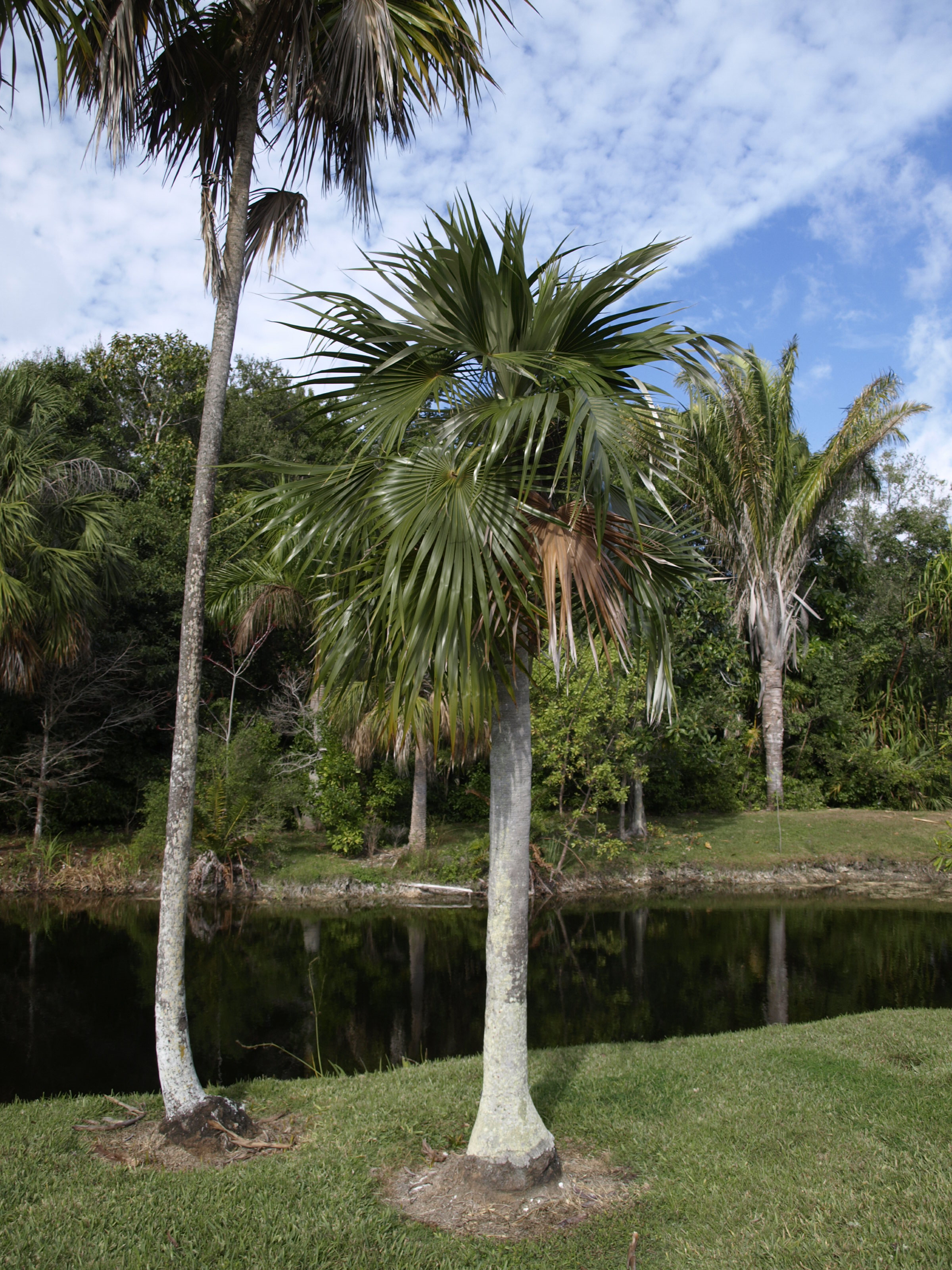
  Coccothrinax readii
- Coccothrinax rigida Becc.
- Coccothrinax salvatoris León
  - C. salvatoris subsp. loricata (León) Borhidi & O.Muñiz
  - C. salvatoris subsp. salvatoris
- Coccothrinax saxicola León
- Coccothrinax scoparia Becc.] Haitian mountain silver palm
- Coccothrinax spirituana Verdecia & Moya
- Coccothrinax spissa L.H.Bailey Guano, Swollen silver thatch palm
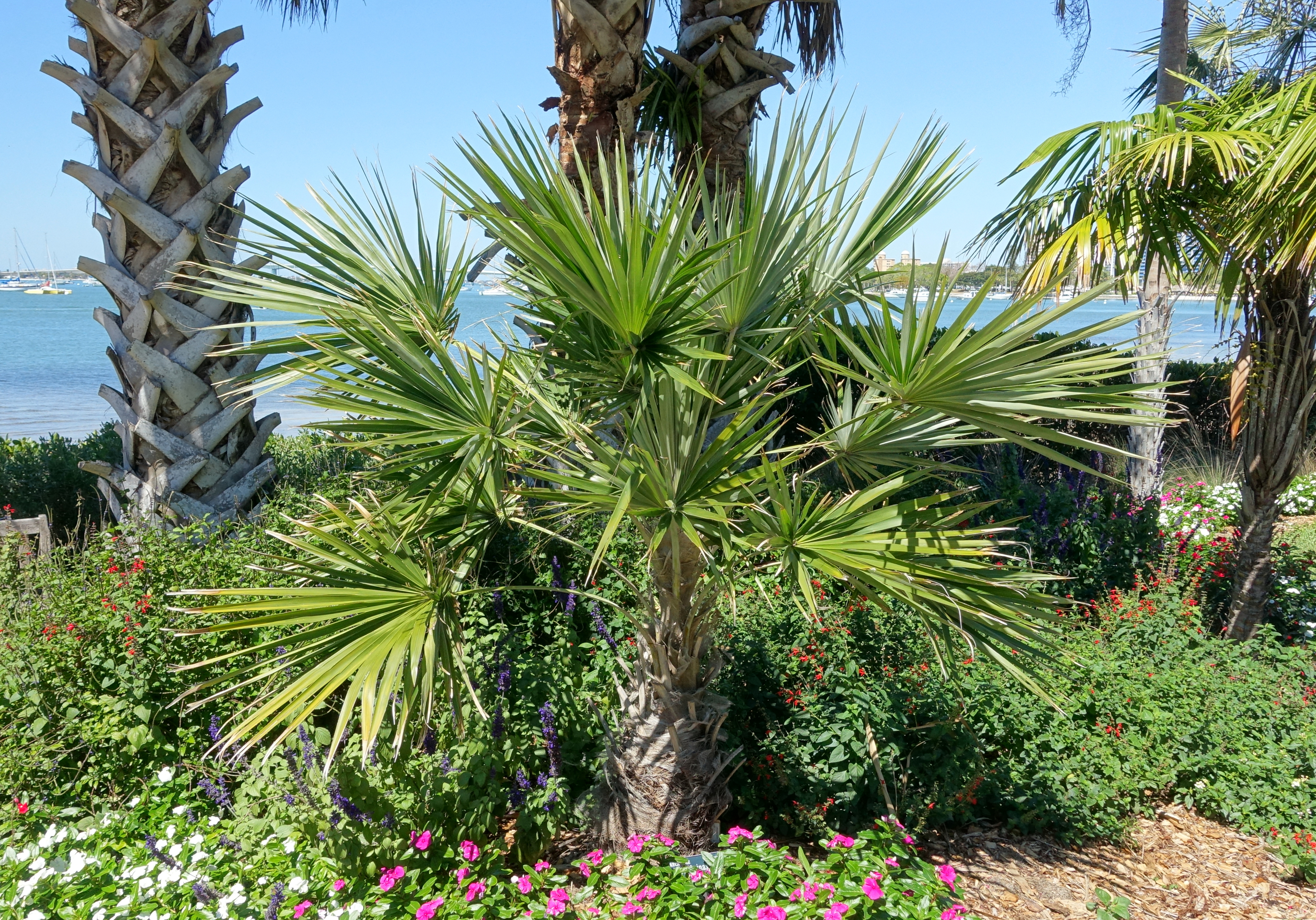
  Coccothrinax spissa
- Coccothrinax torrida Morici & Verdecia
- Coccothrinax trinitensis Borhidi & O.Muñiz
- Coccothrinax victorinii León
- Coccothrinax yunquensis Borhidi & O.Muñiz
- Coccothrinax yuraguana (A.Rich.) León Yuraguana

== See also ==
- List of palms native to the Caribbean
