= Silver Palm =

Silver Palm may be any of the following:

== Palm trees ==
- Coccothrinax argentata - Silver palm, Florida silver palm or Silver thatch palm
- Coccothrinax argentea - Hispaniolan silver palm or Silver thatch palm
- Coccothrinax barbadensis - Silver palm, Barbados silver palm or Lesser Antilles silver thatch pal
- Coccothrinax jamaicensis - Jamaican silver thatch palm
- Coccothrinax litoralis - Cuban silver palm
- Coccothrinax readii - Mexican silver palm
- Coccothrinax scoparia - Haitian mountain silver palm
- Coccothrinax spissa - Swollen silver thatch palm

== Places ==
- Silver Palm, Florida - A former populated place in southern Miami-Dade County, Florida
- Silver Palm Drive, a name for Florida State Road 908
- Silver Palm Schoolhouse, a historic school in Redland, Florida

== Awards ==
- Silver Palm, an additional device on the Boy Scouts of America Eagle Scout award
- Silver Palm, a class of the Order of the Crown (Belgium)
- Silver Palm, an additional device on the Croix de guerre (Belgium)
- Silver Palm, an additional device on the French Croix de Guerre
- Silver Palm, a class of the French Ordre des Palmes académiques
- Silver Palm, an additional device on the United States Medal of Freedom (1945)

== Other uses ==
- The Silver Palm (train), a passenger train formerly operated by Amtrak
