= Coccothrinax alexandri =

Scientific classification
- Kingdom: Plantae
- Clade: Tracheophytes
- Clade: Angiosperms
- Clade: Monocots
- Clade: Commelinids
- Order: Arecales
- Family: Arecaceae
- Genus: Coccothrinax
- Species: C. alexandri

Binomial name
- Coccothrinax alexandri León

Species of palm

Coccothrinax alexandri is a palm which is endemic to eastern Cuba. Like other members of the genus, C. alexandri is a fan palm. Two subspecies are recognised—Coccothrinax alexandri subsp. alexandri and Coccothrinax alexandri subsp. nitida (León) Borhidi & O.Muñiz.

Andrew Henderson and colleagues (1995) considered C. alexandri to be a synonym of Coccothrinax miraguama.
