= Coccothrinax acunana =

Conservation status
- Vulnerable (IUCN 3.1)

Scientific classification
- Kingdom: Plantae
- Clade: Tracheophytes
- Clade: Angiosperms
- Clade: Monocots
- Clade: Commelinids
- Order: Arecales
- Family: Arecaceae
- Genus: Coccothrinax
- Species: C. acunana

Binomial name
- Coccothrinax acunana León

Species of palm

Coccothrinax acunana is a species of flowering plant in the family Arecaceae. It is sometimes referred to by the common name sierra palm, and is endemic to Pico Turquino in Cuba. It grows at high elevations (above 900 m), reportedly higher than any other Cuban palm. Like other members of the genus, C. acunana is a fan palm.

Andrew Henderson and colleagues (1995) considered C. acunana to be a synonym of Coccothrinax miraguama.
