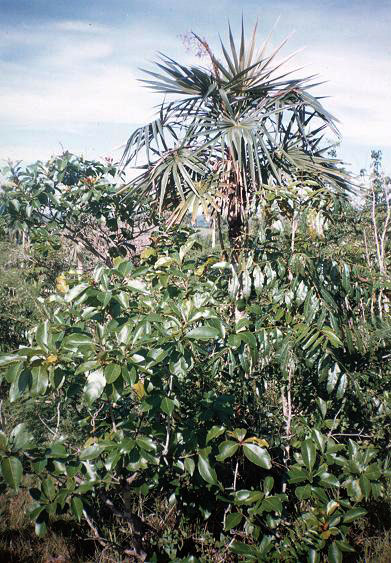

Conservation status
- Vulnerable (IUCN 3.1)

Scientific classification
- Kingdom: Plantae
- Clade: Tracheophytes
- Clade: Angiosperms
- Clade: Monocots
- Clade: Commelinids
- Order: Arecales
- Family: Arecaceae
- Genus: Coccothrinax
- Species: C. clarensis

Binomial name
- Coccothrinax clarensis León

= Coccothrinax clarensis =

Species of palm

Coccothrinax clarensis is a species of flowering plant in the family Arecaceae. It is endemic to central and eastern Cuba. Its name suggests that it has small coconut-like fruit (Greek coccos:berry and thrinax:trident or winnowing fork) while clarensis comes from Santa Clara valley in Cuba where the species are found.

Two subspecies are recognised:

- Coccothrinax clarensis subsp. brevifolia (León) Borhidi & O.Muñiz
- Coccothrinax clarensis subsp. clarensis

Henderson and colleagues (1995) considered C. clarensis subsp. clarensis to be a synonym of Coccothrinax gundlachii and C. clarensis subsp. brevifolia to be a synonym of Coccothrinax pauciramosa.
