= Coccothrinax torrida =

Scientific classification
- Kingdom: Plantae
- Clade: Tracheophytes
- Clade: Angiosperms
- Clade: Monocots
- Clade: Commelinids
- Order: Arecales
- Family: Arecaceae
- Genus: Coccothrinax
- Species: C. torrida

Binomial name
- Coccothrinax torrida Carlo Morici & Raúl Verdecia Pérez

Species of palm

Coccothrinax torrida is a palm endemic to southeastern Cuba. It is known from a single isolated hill on the coast of the Guantánamo Province. The climate of the area is described as semi-desert with 9 or 10 dry months. Like other members of the genus, C. torrida is a fan palm. Trees are single-stemmed, between 2 and 8 m tall with stems 2.5 to 3.9 (occasionally up to 4.5) cm in diameter. The fruit is creamy white, 4.8–6.3 mm in diameter.

The species was first described in 2006 from material collected in 2003. It is related to C. pauciramosa, and is characterized by the following features: narrow semiorbicular flat leaves that are covered on the adaxial surface by white wax; a small irregular palman; long and erect inflorescences; and small, white, smooth fruits. C. torrida and C. montana are the only described species with white fruits in the genus Coccothrinax. Since it is known from a single population of about 5000 individuals, the species is considered Vulnerable.
