= Coccothrinax munizii =

Scientific classification
- Kingdom: Plantae
- Clade: Tracheophytes
- Clade: Angiosperms
- Clade: Monocots
- Clade: Commelinids
- Order: Arecales
- Family: Arecaceae
- Genus: Coccothrinax
- Species: C. munizii

Binomial name
- Coccothrinax munizii Borhidi

Species of palm

Coccothrinax munizii is a species of palm tree that is endemic to eastern Cuba. Like other members of the genus Coccothrinax, C. munizii is a fan palm. It grows on rocky hills or in dry scrub forest on limestone.

Henderson and colleagues (1995) considered C. munizii to be a synonym of Coccothrinax ekmanii.
