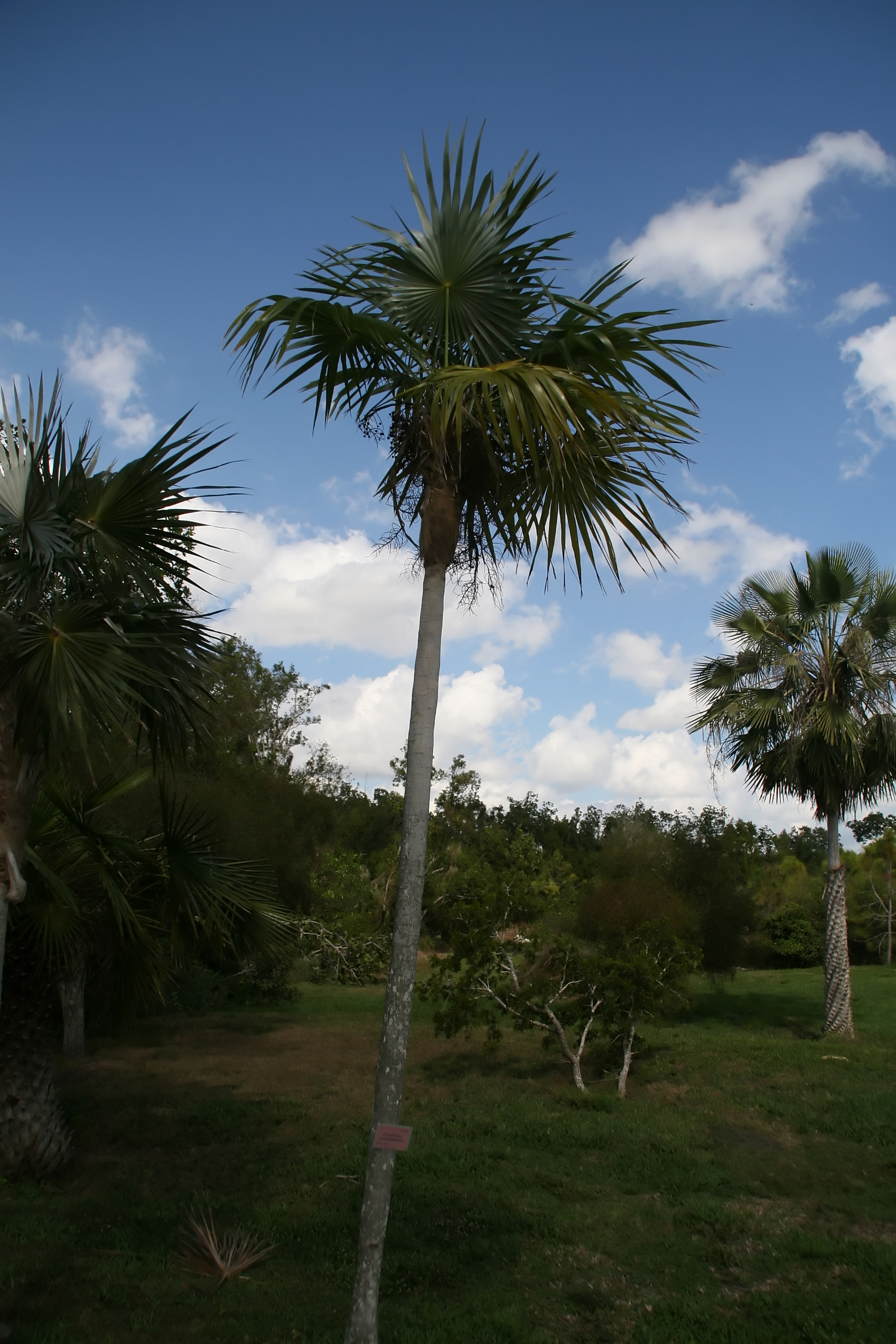

Conservation status
- Critically Endangered (IUCN 3.1)

Scientific classification
- Kingdom: Plantae
- Clade: Embryophytes
- Clade: Tracheophytes
- Clade: Spermatophytes
- Clade: Angiosperms
- Clade: Monocots
- Clade: Commelinids
- Order: Arecales
- Family: Arecaceae
- Genus: Coccothrinax
- Species: C. guantanamensis

Binomial name
- Coccothrinax guantanamensis (León) O.Muñiz & Borhidi

Synonyms
- Coccothrinax argentea subsp. guantanamensis (León) Borhidi & O.Muñiz; Coccothrinax argentea var. guantanamensis León

= Coccothrinax guantanamensis =

Species of palm

Coccothrinax guantanamensis is a species of flowering plant in the palm family, Arecaceae. It is endemic to eastern Cuba.

Henderson and colleagues (1995) considered C. guantanamensis to be a synonym of Coccothrinax hioramii.
