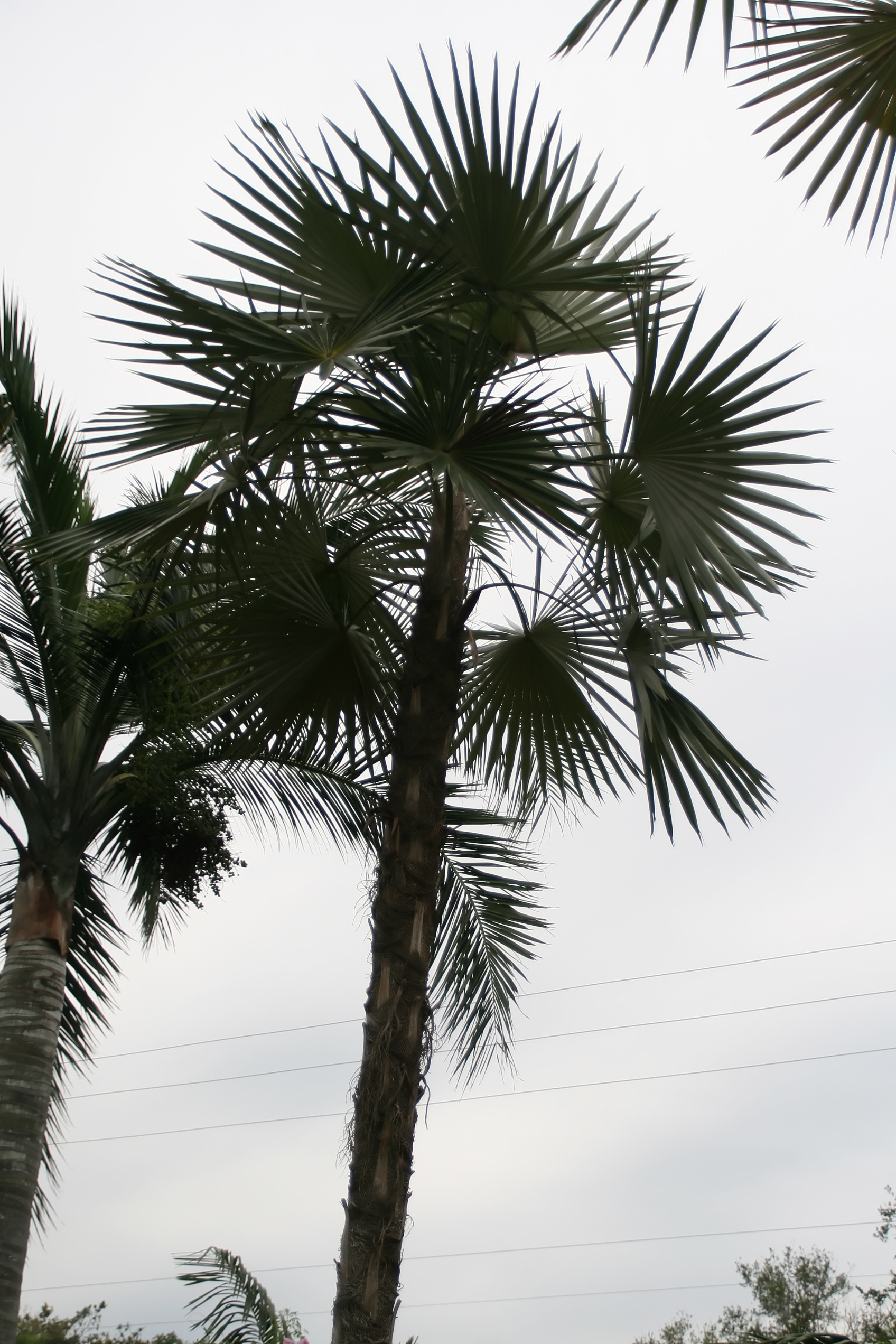
- Coccothrinax cupularis

Conservation status
- Least Concern (IUCN 3.1)

Scientific classification
- Kingdom: Plantae
- Clade: Tracheophytes
- Clade: Angiosperms
- Clade: Monocots
- Clade: Commelinids
- Order: Arecales
- Family: Arecaceae
- Genus: Coccothrinax
- Species: C. cupularis

Binomial name
- Coccothrinax cupularis (León) O.Muñiz & Borhidi

Synonyms
- Coccothrinax miraguama subsp. cupularis (León) Borhidi & O.Muñiz; Coccothrinax miraguama var. cupularis León

= Coccothrinax cupularis =

Species of palm

Coccothrinax cupularis is a species of flowering plant in the family Arecaceae. This palm is endemic to southern Cuba.

Henderson and colleagues (1995) considered C. cupularis to be a synonym of Coccothrinax miraguama.
