= Coccothrinax orientalis =

Conservation status
- Endangered (IUCN 3.1)

Scientific classification
- Kingdom: Plantae
- Clade: Embryophytes
- Clade: Tracheophytes
- Clade: Angiosperms
- Clade: Monocots
- Clade: Commelinids
- Order: Arecales
- Family: Arecaceae
- Genus: Coccothrinax
- Species: C. orientalis

Binomial name
- Coccothrinax orientalis (León) O.Muñiz & Borhidi

Synonyms
- Coccothrinax yuraguana var. orientalis León; Coccothrinax yuraguana subsp. orientalis (León) Borhidi

Species of palm

Coccothrinax orientalis is a species of flowering plant in the palm family, Arecaceae. It is endemic to eastern Cuba.

Henderson and colleagues (1995) considered C. orientalis to be a synonym of Coccothrinax miraguama.
