= Coccothrinax bermudezii =

Scientific classification
- Kingdom: Plantae
- Clade: Tracheophytes
- Clade: Angiosperms
- Clade: Monocots
- Clade: Commelinids
- Order: Arecales
- Family: Arecaceae
- Genus: Coccothrinax
- Species: C. bermudezii

Binomial name
- Coccothrinax bermudezii León

Species of palm

Coccothrinax bermudezii is a palm which is endemic to southeastern Cuba. Henderson and colleagues (1995) considered C. acunana to be a synonym of Coccothrinax miraguama.
