= Coccothrinax microphylla =

Scientific classification
- Kingdom: Plantae
- Clade: Tracheophytes
- Clade: Angiosperms
- Clade: Monocots
- Clade: Commelinids
- Order: Arecales
- Family: Arecaceae
- Genus: Coccothrinax
- Species: C. microphylla

Binomial name
- Coccothrinax microphylla Borhidi & O.Muñiz

Species of palm

Coccothrinax microphylla is a palm which is endemic to eastern Cuba.

Henderson and colleagues (1995) considered C. microphylla to be a synonym of Coccothrinax pauciramosa.
