= Coccothrinax garciana =

Conservation status
- Least Concern (IUCN 3.1)

Scientific classification
- Kingdom: Plantae
- Clade: Tracheophytes
- Clade: Angiosperms
- Clade: Monocots
- Clade: Commelinids
- Order: Arecales
- Family: Arecaceae
- Genus: Coccothrinax
- Species: C. garciana

Binomial name
- Coccothrinax garciana León

Species of palm

Coccothrinax garciana is a species of flowering plant in the family Arecaceae. This palm which is endemic to Holguín Province, Cuba.

Henderson and colleagues (1995) considered C. garciana to be a synonym of Coccothrinax pauciramosa.
