= Coccothrinax saxicola =

Conservation status
- Least Concern (IUCN 3.1)

Scientific classification
- Kingdom: Plantae
- Clade: Tracheophytes
- Clade: Angiosperms
- Clade: Monocots
- Clade: Commelinids
- Order: Arecales
- Family: Arecaceae
- Genus: Coccothrinax
- Species: C. saxicola

Binomial name
- Coccothrinax saxicola León

Species of palm

Coccothrinax saxicola is a species of flowering plant in the palm family, Arecaceae. It is endemic to eastern Cuba.

Henderson and colleagues (1995) considered C. saxicola to be a synonym of Coccothrinax miraguama.
