= Coccothrinax muricata =

Conservation status
- Endangered (IUCN 3.1)

Scientific classification
- Kingdom: Plantae
- Clade: Tracheophytes
- Clade: Angiosperms
- Clade: Monocots
- Clade: Commelinids
- Order: Arecales
- Family: Arecaceae
- Genus: Coccothrinax
- Species: C. muricata

Binomial name
- Coccothrinax muricata León

Species of palm

Coccothrinax muricata a species of flowering plant in the palm family, Arecaceae. It is endemic to east central Cuba.

Henderson and colleagues (1995) considered C. muricata to be a synonym of Coccothrinax pauciramosa.
