= Coccothrinax leonis =

Scientific classification
- Kingdom: Plantae
- Clade: Tracheophytes
- Clade: Angiosperms
- Clade: Monocots
- Clade: Commelinids
- Order: Arecales
- Family: Arecaceae
- Genus: Coccothrinax
- Species: C. leonis

Binomial name
- Coccothrinax leonis O.Muñiz & Borhidi

Species of palm

Coccothrinax leonis is a palm which is endemic to Cuba.

Henderson and colleagues (1995) considered C. leonis to be a synonym of Coccothrinax miraguama.
