= Coccothrinax yuraguana =

Conservation status
- Critically Endangered (IUCN 3.1)

Scientific classification
- Kingdom: Plantae
- Clade: Embryophytes
- Clade: Tracheophytes
- Clade: Spermatophytes
- Clade: Angiosperms
- Clade: Monocots
- Clade: Commelinids
- Order: Arecales
- Family: Arecaceae
- Genus: Coccothrinax
- Species: C. yuraguana

Binomial name
- Coccothrinax yuraguana León

Species of palm

Coccothrinax yuraguana is a species of flowering plant in the palm family, Arecaceae. It is endemic to western Cuba.

Henderson and colleagues (1995) considered C. yuraguana to be a synonym of Coccothrinax miraguama.
