= Coccothrinax moaensis =

Scientific classification
- Kingdom: Plantae
- Clade: Tracheophytes
- Clade: Angiosperms
- Clade: Monocots
- Clade: Commelinids
- Order: Arecales
- Family: Arecaceae
- Genus: Coccothrinax
- Species: C. moaensis

Binomial name
- Coccothrinax moaensis (Borhidi & O.Muñiz) O.Muñiz

Species of palm

Coccothrinax moaensis is a palm which is endemic to eastern Cuba.

Henderson and colleagues (1995) considered C. moaensis to be a synonym of Coccothrinax miraguama.
