= Coccothrinax baracoensis =

Scientific classification
- Kingdom: Plantae
- Clade: Tracheophytes
- Clade: Angiosperms
- Clade: Monocots
- Clade: Commelinids
- Order: Arecales
- Family: Arecaceae
- Genus: Coccothrinax
- Species: C. baracoensis

Binomial name
- Coccothrinax baracoensis Borhidi & O.Muñiz

Species of palm

Coccothrinax baracoensis is a palm which is endemic to southeastern Cuba.

Henderson and colleagues (1995) considered C. baracoensis to be a synonym of Coccothrinax miraguama.
