= Coccothrinax trinitensis =

Scientific classification
- Kingdom: Plantae
- Clade: Tracheophytes
- Clade: Angiosperms
- Clade: Monocots
- Clade: Commelinids
- Order: Arecales
- Family: Arecaceae
- Genus: Coccothrinax
- Species: C. trinitensis

Binomial name
- Coccothrinax trinitensis Borhidi & O.Muñiz

Species of palm

Coccothrinax trinitensis is a palm which is endemic to east central Cuba.

Henderson and colleagues (1995) considered C. trinitensis to be a synonym of Coccothrinax miraguama.
