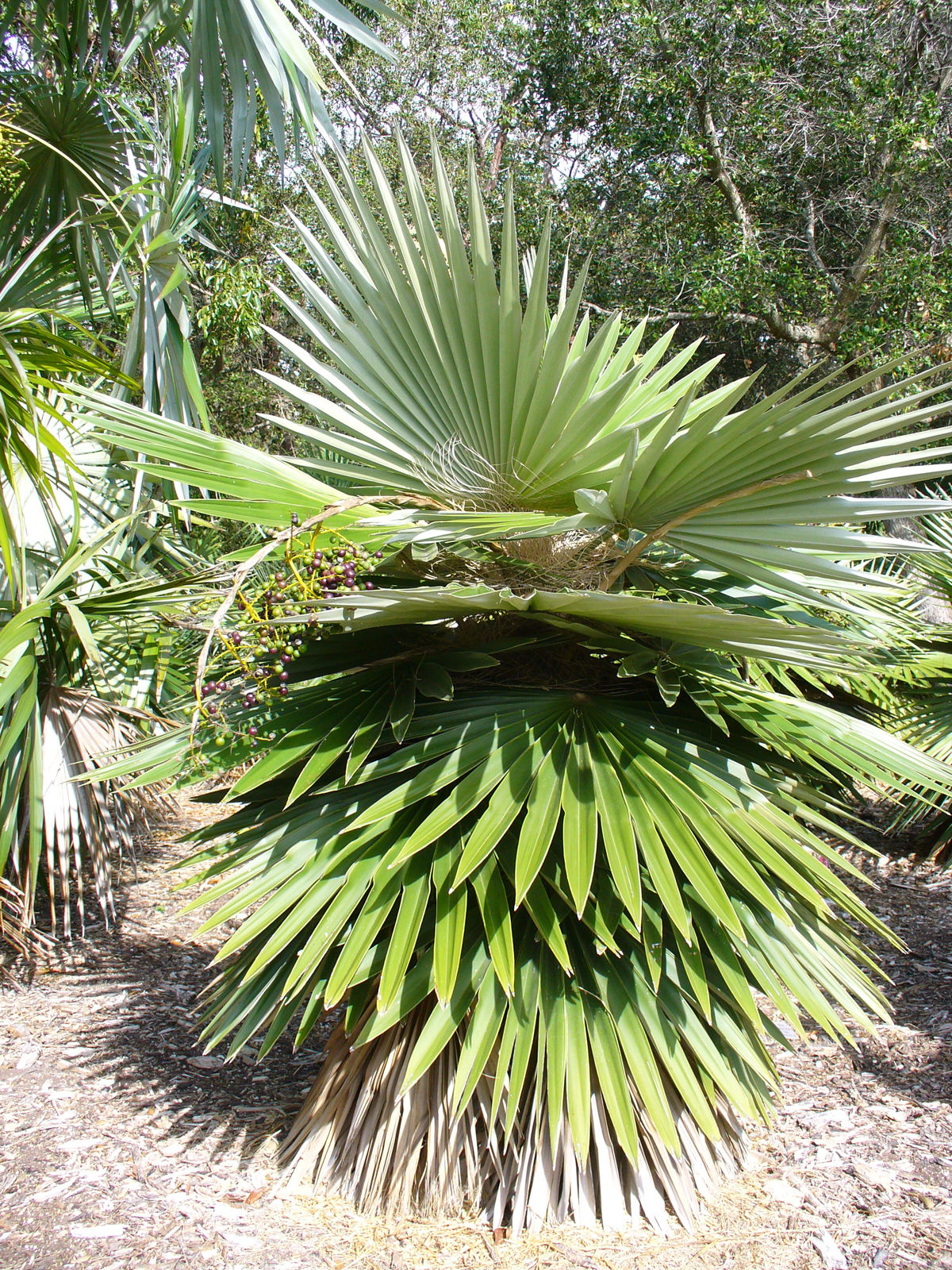
- Coccothrinax borhidiana at Montgomery Botanical Center, Miami, Florida; Photo by Scott Zona

Conservation status
- Critically Endangered (IUCN 3.1)

Scientific classification
- Kingdom: Plantae
- Clade: Embryophytes
- Clade: Tracheophytes
- Clade: Spermatophytes
- Clade: Angiosperms
- Clade: Monocots
- Clade: Commelinids
- Order: Arecales
- Family: Arecaceae
- Genus: Coccothrinax
- Species: C. borhidiana

Binomial name
- Coccothrinax borhidiana O.Muñiz

= Coccothrinax borhidiana =

Species of palm

Coccothrinax borhidiana (guano, Borhidi's guano palm) is a palm which is endemic to Matanzas Province in Cuba. Like other members of the genus, C. borhidiana is a fan palm.

Coccothrinax borhidiana is restricted to an area of less than 10 km^{2} on raised limestone beaches near the sea and is threatened by development and livestock grazing.

It was named after Attila Borhidi, Hungarian botanist.
