= Coccothrinax yunquensis =

Scientific classification
- Kingdom: Plantae
- Clade: Tracheophytes
- Clade: Angiosperms
- Clade: Monocots
- Clade: Commelinids
- Order: Arecales
- Family: Arecaceae
- Genus: Coccothrinax
- Species: C. yunquensis

Binomial name
- Coccothrinax yunquensis Borhidi & O.Muñiz

Species of palm

Coccothrinax yunquensis, the yuruguana del Yunque, is a palm which is endemic to southern Cuba. It is reported to be restricted to El Yunque, a limestone mountain in Guantánamo Province.

Henderson and colleagues (1995) considered C. yunquensis to be a synonym of Coccothrinax salvatoris.
