= Coccothrinax pumila =

Scientific classification
- Kingdom: Plantae
- Clade: Tracheophytes
- Clade: Angiosperms
- Clade: Monocots
- Clade: Commelinids
- Order: Arecales
- Family: Arecaceae
- Genus: Coccothrinax
- Species: C. pumila

Binomial name
- Coccothrinax pumila Borhidi & J.A.Hern.

Species of palm

Coccothrinax pumila is a palm which is endemic to Cuba.
