= Coccothrinax concolor =

Conservation status
- Data Deficient (IUCN 3.1)

Scientific classification
- Kingdom: Plantae
- Clade: Tracheophytes
- Clade: Angiosperms
- Clade: Monocots
- Clade: Commelinids
- Order: Arecales
- Family: Arecaceae
- Genus: Coccothrinax
- Species: C. concolor

Binomial name
- Coccothrinax concolor Burret

Species of palm

Coccothrinax concolor is a palm which is endemic to Haiti.

Henderson and colleagues (1995) considered C. concolor to be a synonym of Coccothrinax miraguama.
