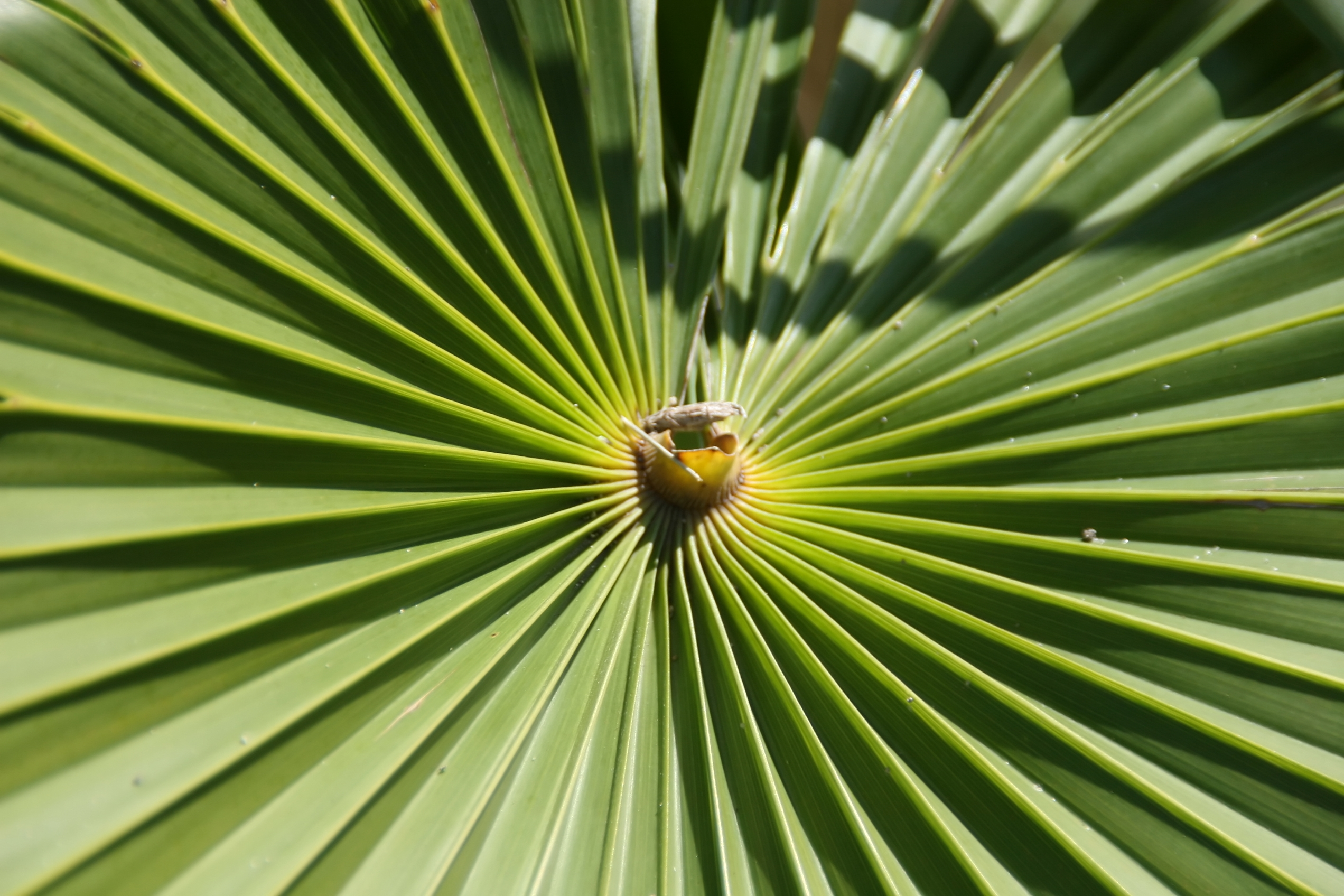

Conservation status
- Endangered (IUCN 3.1)

Scientific classification
- Kingdom: Plantae
- Clade: Tracheophytes
- Clade: Angiosperms
- Clade: Monocots
- Clade: Commelinids
- Order: Arecales
- Family: Arecaceae
- Genus: Coccothrinax
- Species: C. hioramii

Binomial name
- Coccothrinax hioramii León

= Coccothrinax hioramii =

Species of palm

Coccothrinax hioramii is a species of flowering plant in the palm family, Arecaceae. It is endemic to eastern Cuba, in open sandy coastal areas. Like other members of the genus, C. hioramii is a fan palm. Trees are single-stemmed, between 6 and 12 metres tall with stems 7 to 15 centimetres in diameter. The fruit is black, 0.9–1.1 cm in diameter.

Henderson and colleagues spelled the name C. hiorami.
