= Coccothrinax nipensis =

Scientific classification
- Kingdom: Plantae
- Clade: Tracheophytes
- Clade: Angiosperms
- Clade: Monocots
- Clade: Commelinids
- Order: Arecales
- Family: Arecaceae
- Genus: Coccothrinax
- Species: C. nipensis

Binomial name
- Coccothrinax nipensis Borhidi & O.Muñiz

Species of palm

Coccothrinax nipensis is a palm which is endemic to eastern Cuba. It was described by Attila Borhidi and O.Muñiz in the year 1981.
