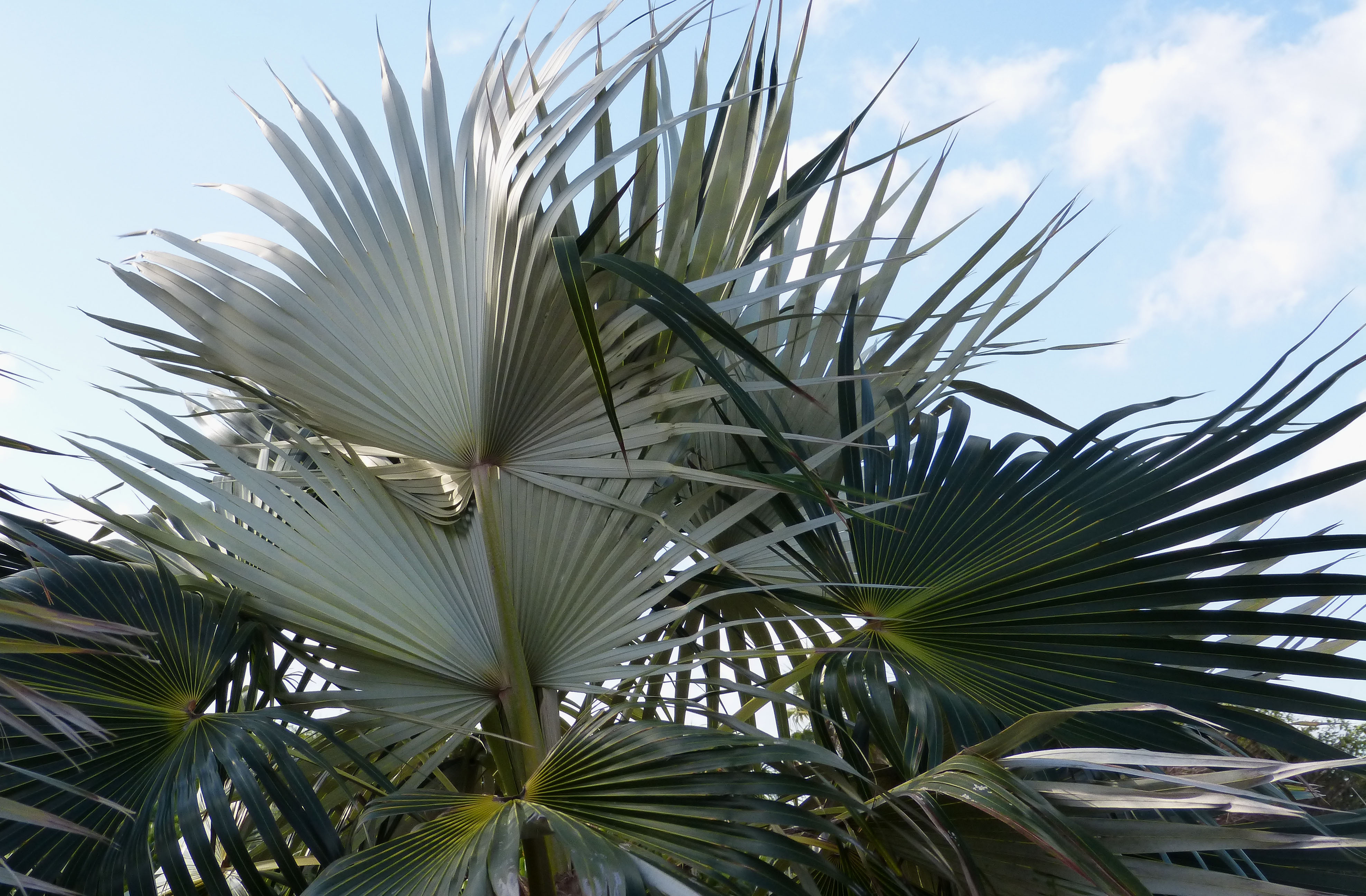

Conservation status
- Least Concern (IUCN 3.1)

Scientific classification
- Kingdom: Plantae
- Clade: Tracheophytes
- Clade: Angiosperms
- Clade: Monocots
- Clade: Commelinids
- Order: Arecales
- Family: Arecaceae
- Genus: Coccothrinax
- Species: C. litoralis

Binomial name
- Coccothrinax litoralis León

= Coccothrinax litoralis =

Species of palm

Coccothrinax litoralis is a species of flowering plant in the family Arecaceae. It is sometimes referred to by the common name Cuban silver palm, and is endemic to Cuba.

Henderson and colleagues (1995) considered C. litoralis to be a synonym of Coccothrinax argentata.
