= Coccothrinax rigida =

Scientific classification
- Kingdom: Plantae
- Clade: Tracheophytes
- Clade: Angiosperms
- Clade: Monocots
- Clade: Commelinids
- Order: Arecales
- Family: Arecaceae
- Genus: Coccothrinax
- Species: C. rigida

Binomial name
- Coccothrinax rigida (Griseb. & H.Wendl.) Becc.

Synonyms
- Thrinax rigida Griseb. & H.Wendl.

Species of palm

Coccothrinax rigida is a species of flowering plant in the family Arecaceae . It is a palm which is endemic to eastern Cuba.

Henderson and colleagues (1995) considered C. rigida to be a synonym of Coccothrinax miraguama.
