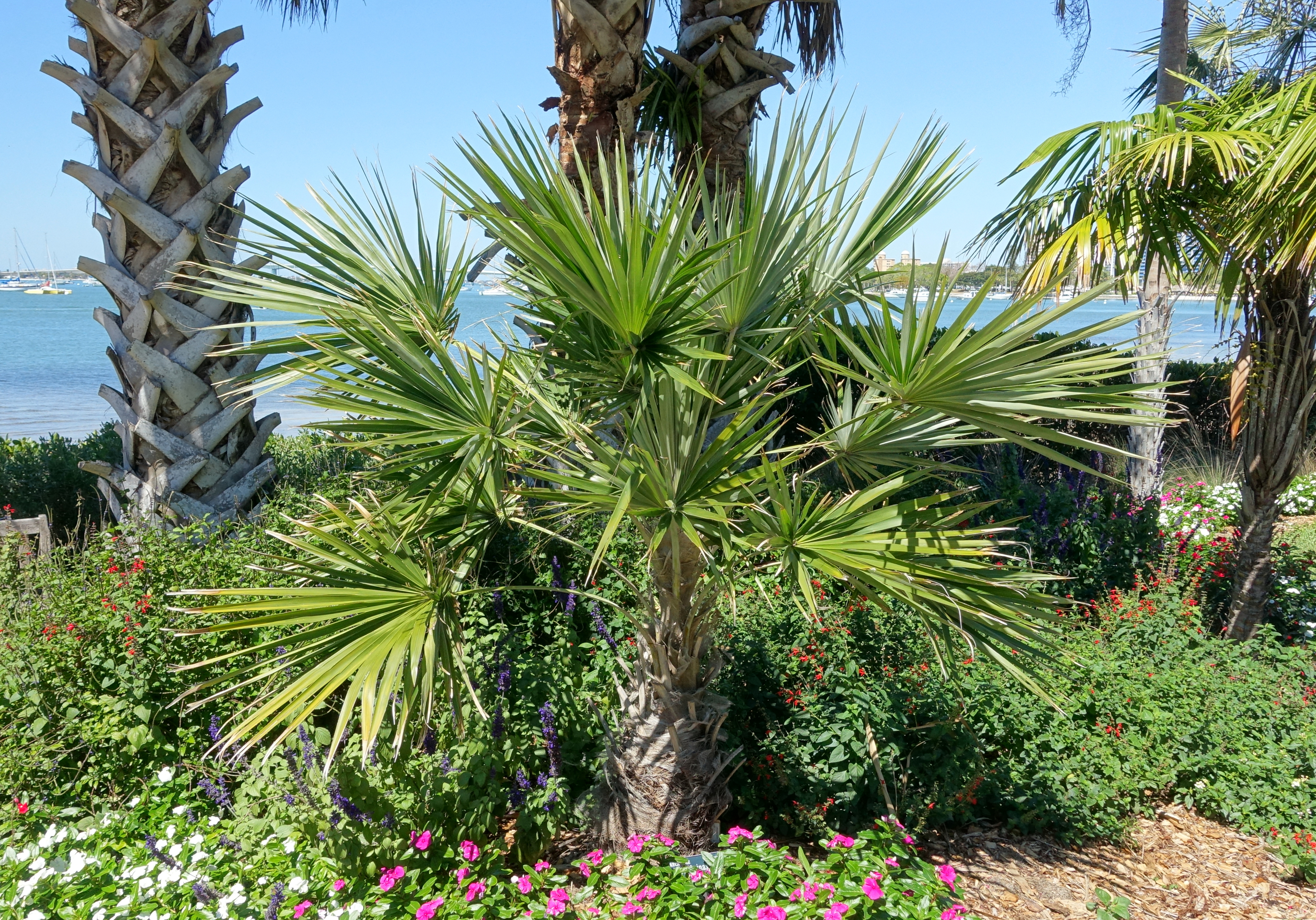

Scientific classification
- Kingdom: Plantae
- Clade: Tracheophytes
- Clade: Angiosperms
- Clade: Monocots
- Clade: Commelinids
- Order: Arecales
- Family: Arecaceae
- Genus: Coccothrinax
- Species: C. spissa

Binomial name
- Coccothrinax spissa L.H.Bailey

= Coccothrinax spissa =

Species of palm

Coccothrinax spissa, the guano or swollen silver thatch palm, is a palm which is endemic to the island of Hispaniola.

== Description ==
Like other members of this genus, Coccothrinax spissa is a fan palm. Stems grow singly and are 3 to 8 metres tall and 20 to 30 centimetres in diameter, usually swollen. The fruit is dark purple, 1.1 to 1.2 cm in diameter. It grows in open areas in dry habitats, or at the margins of woodlands at low elevations (below 400 m above sea level).
