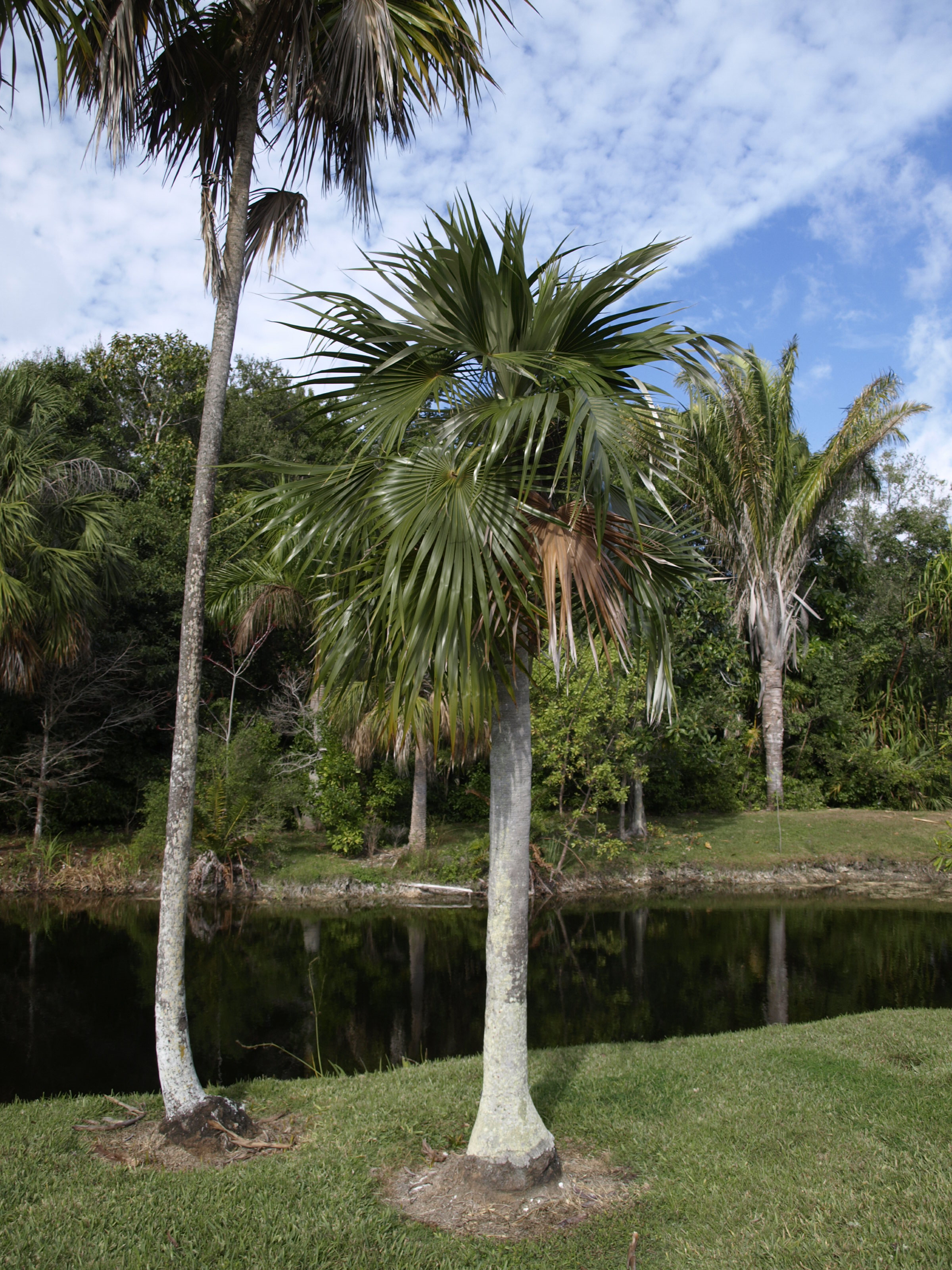

Scientific classification
- Kingdom: Plantae
- Clade: Tracheophytes
- Clade: Angiosperms
- Clade: Monocots
- Clade: Commelinids
- Order: Arecales
- Family: Arecaceae
- Genus: Coccothrinax
- Species: C. readii

Binomial name
- Coccothrinax readii H.J.Quero

= Coccothrinax readii =

Species of palm

Coccothrinax readii, the Mexican silver palm, is a palm which is native to southeastern Mexico and northeastern Belize.

Henderson and colleagues (1995) considered C. readii to be a synonym of Coccothrinax argentata.
