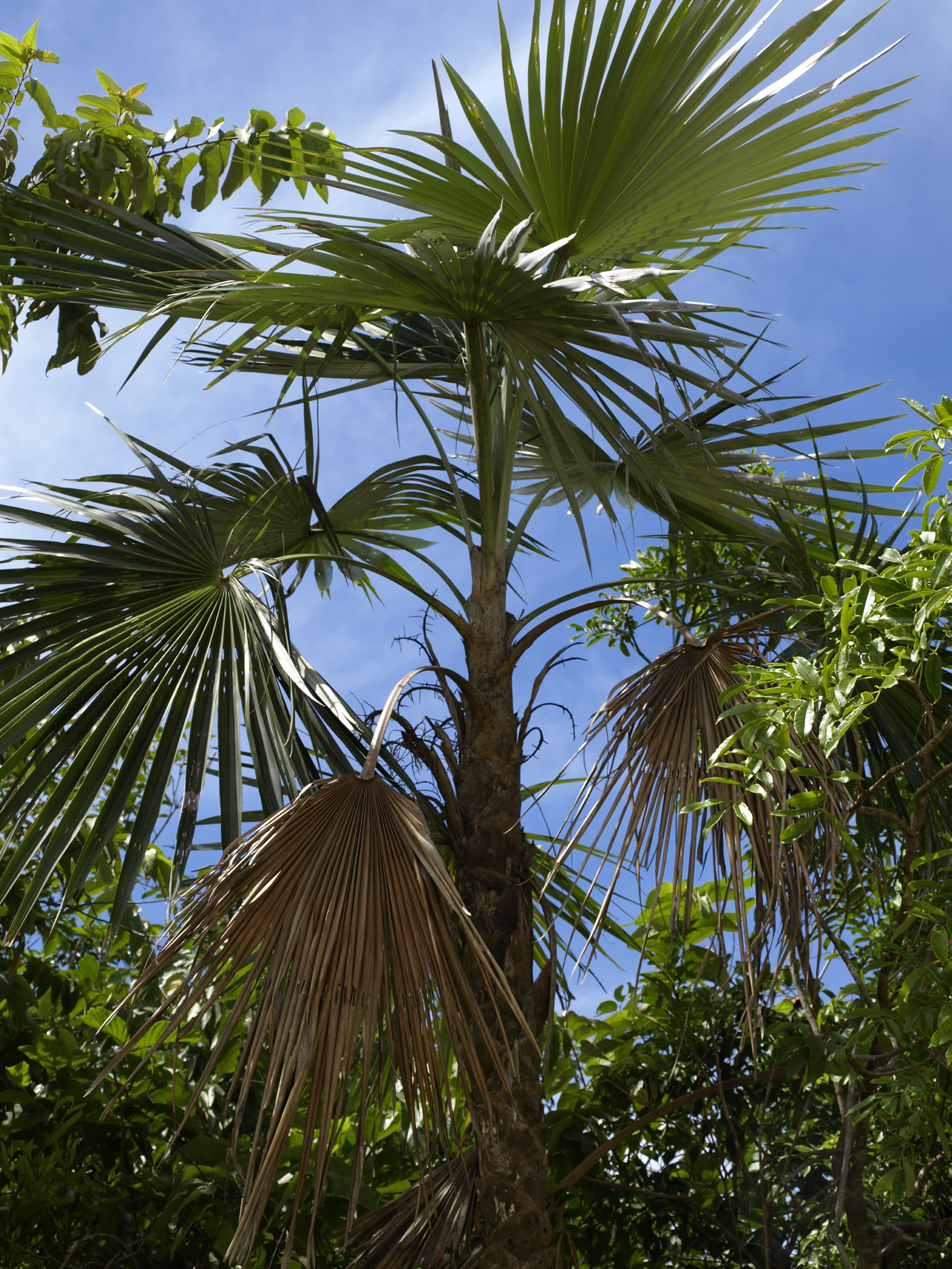

Conservation status
- Least Concern (IUCN 3.1)

Scientific classification
- Kingdom: Plantae
- Clade: Tracheophytes
- Clade: Angiosperms
- Clade: Monocots
- Clade: Commelinids
- Order: Arecales
- Family: Arecaceae
- Genus: Coccothrinax
- Species: C. argentea

Binomial name
- Coccothrinax argentea (Lodd. ex Schult. & Schult.f.) Sarg. ex Becc.

= Coccothrinax argentea =

Species of palm

Coccothrinax argentea is a palm which is endemic to Hispaniola.

This species is frequently confused with Coccothrinax argentata.

== Description ==
It is a medium-sized palm, growing to about 10 m tall. The leaves are dark green above and silvery below; like other Coccothrinax species, C. argentea is a fan palm.

== Uses ==
Very young leaves are eaten as a vegetable. It is also used medicinally by traditional healers to treat uterine fibroids and hot flashes.

== Name ==
Common names include: Hispaniola silver thatch palm, Cana, Guano, Latanye marron, Latanye savanne, Broom palm, Hispaniolan silver palm, Silver thatch palm, Palmera plateada de La Hispaniola, Guanito, Guano de escoba.
