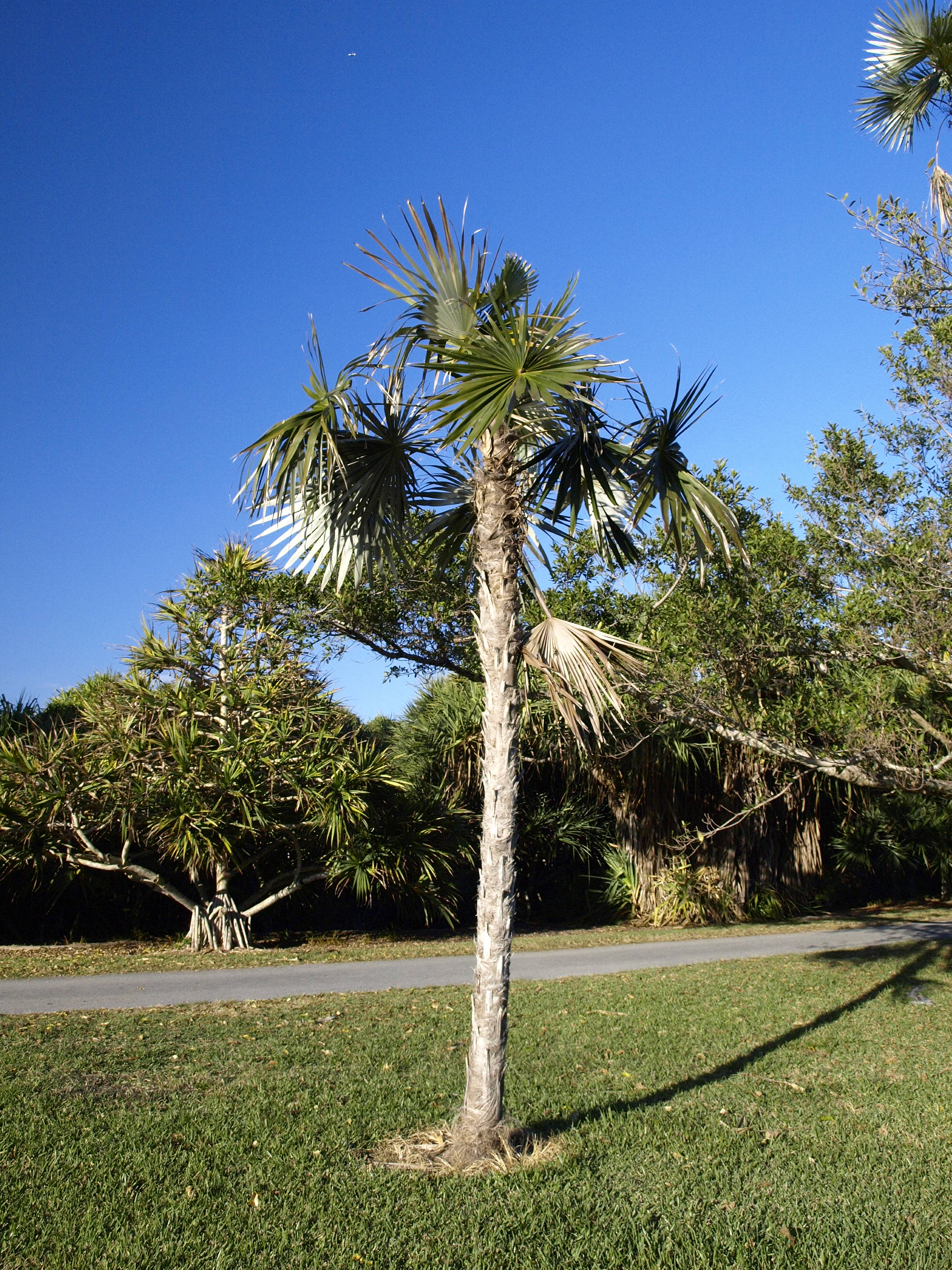

Conservation status
- Least Concern (IUCN 3.1)

Scientific classification
- Kingdom: Plantae
- Clade: Tracheophytes
- Clade: Angiosperms
- Clade: Monocots
- Clade: Commelinids
- Order: Arecales
- Family: Arecaceae
- Genus: Coccothrinax
- Species: C. salvatoris

Binomial name
- Coccothrinax salvatoris León

= Coccothrinax salvatoris =

Species of palm

Coccothrinax salvatoris is a species of flowering plant in the palm family, Arecaceae. It is endemic to eastern and east central Cuba. It grows up to 8 meters (26 ft) tall, and is found in open terrain less than 500 meters (1,600 ft) above sea level in areas with soils derived from limestone.

Two subspecies are recognised:

- Coccothrinax salvatoris subsp. loricata (León) Borhidi & O.Muñiz
- Coccothrinax salvatoris subsp. salvatoris.
