= Coccothrinax gundlachii =

Conservation status
- Endangered (IUCN 3.1)

Scientific classification
- Kingdom: Plantae
- Clade: Tracheophytes
- Clade: Angiosperms
- Clade: Monocots
- Clade: Commelinids
- Order: Arecales
- Family: Arecaceae
- Genus: Coccothrinax
- Species: C. gundlachii

Binomial name
- Coccothrinax gundlachii León

Species of palm

Coccothrinax gundlachii is a species of flowering plant in the palm family, Arecaceae. It is sometime referred to by the common name yuraguana and is endemic to central and eastern Cuba. Its specific epithet, gundlachii, is in honor of Cuban naturalist Juan Gundlach.

== Description ==
Like other members of the genus, C. gundlachii is a fan palm. Trees are single-stemmed, between 4 and 10 metres tall with stems 7 to 20 centimetres in diameter. The fruit is purple-black, 1–1.3 cm in diameter.
