= Coccothrinax montana =

Scientific classification
- Kingdom: Plantae
- Clade: Tracheophytes
- Clade: Angiosperms
- Clade: Monocots
- Clade: Commelinids
- Order: Arecales
- Family: Arecaceae
- Genus: Coccothrinax
- Species: C. montana

Binomial name
- Coccothrinax montana Burret

Species of palm

Coccothrinax montana is a palm which is endemic to Hispaniola. The Latin specific epithet montana refers to mountains or coming from mountains.

Henderson and colleagues (1995) considered C. montana to be a synonym of Coccothrinax miraguama.
