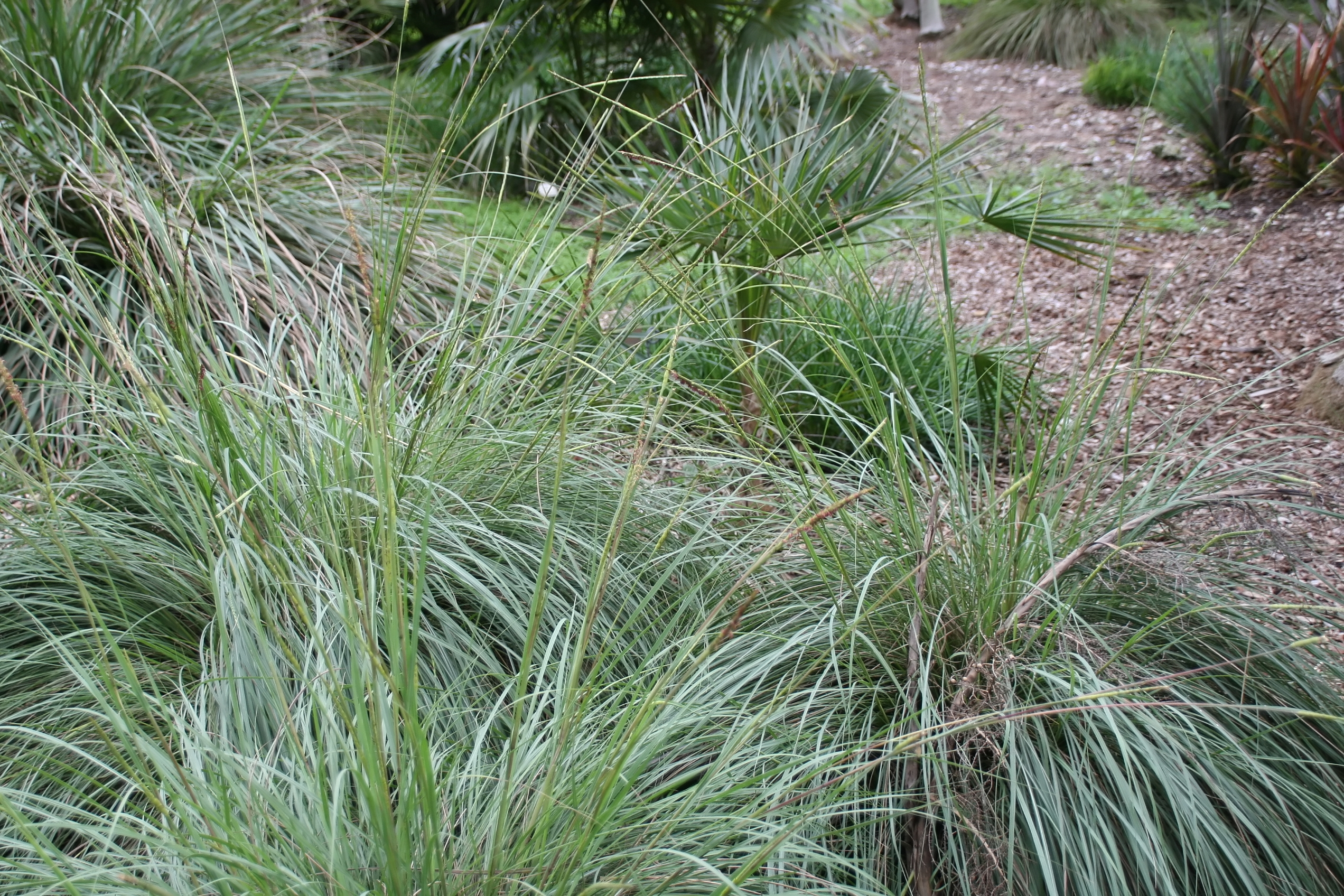

Conservation status
- Endangered (IUCN 3.1)

Scientific classification
- Kingdom: Plantae
- Clade: Tracheophytes
- Clade: Angiosperms
- Clade: Monocots
- Clade: Commelinids
- Order: Arecales
- Family: Arecaceae
- Genus: Coccothrinax
- Species: C. ekmanii

Binomial name
- Coccothrinax ekmanii Burret

= Coccothrinax ekmanii =

Species of palm

Coccothrinax ekmanii, also known in Haitian Creole as gwenn or in Dominican Spanish as palma de guano, is an endangered species of palm which is endemic to the island of Hispaniola (in the Dominican Republic and Haiti).

== Description ==
Like other members of the genus, C. ekmanii is a fan palm. Trees are single-stemmed, between 3 and 15 metres tall with stems 5 to 8 (occasionally 20) centimetres in diameter. The fruit is brownish, 5–6 millimetres in diameter. It grows on rocky hills or in dry scrub forest on limestone.
