= Coccothrinax boschiana =

Scientific classification
- Kingdom: Plantae
- Clade: Tracheophytes
- Clade: Angiosperms
- Clade: Monocots
- Clade: Commelinids
- Order: Arecales
- Family: Arecaceae
- Genus: Coccothrinax
- Species: C. boschiana

Binomial name
- Coccothrinax boschiana Mejía & García, 1997

Species of palm

Coccothrinax boschiana (guano de Barreras) is a palm endemic to dry forests on limestone on the Sierra Martín García ridge and Sierra de Neiba on the Barahona Peninsula in the south of the Dominican Republic on the Caribbean island of Hispaniola. This species was first described in 1997.

== Description ==
C. boschiana is palmate-leaved; its leaves have been described as "golden above and silvery below". Trees grow to about 12 metres in height.
