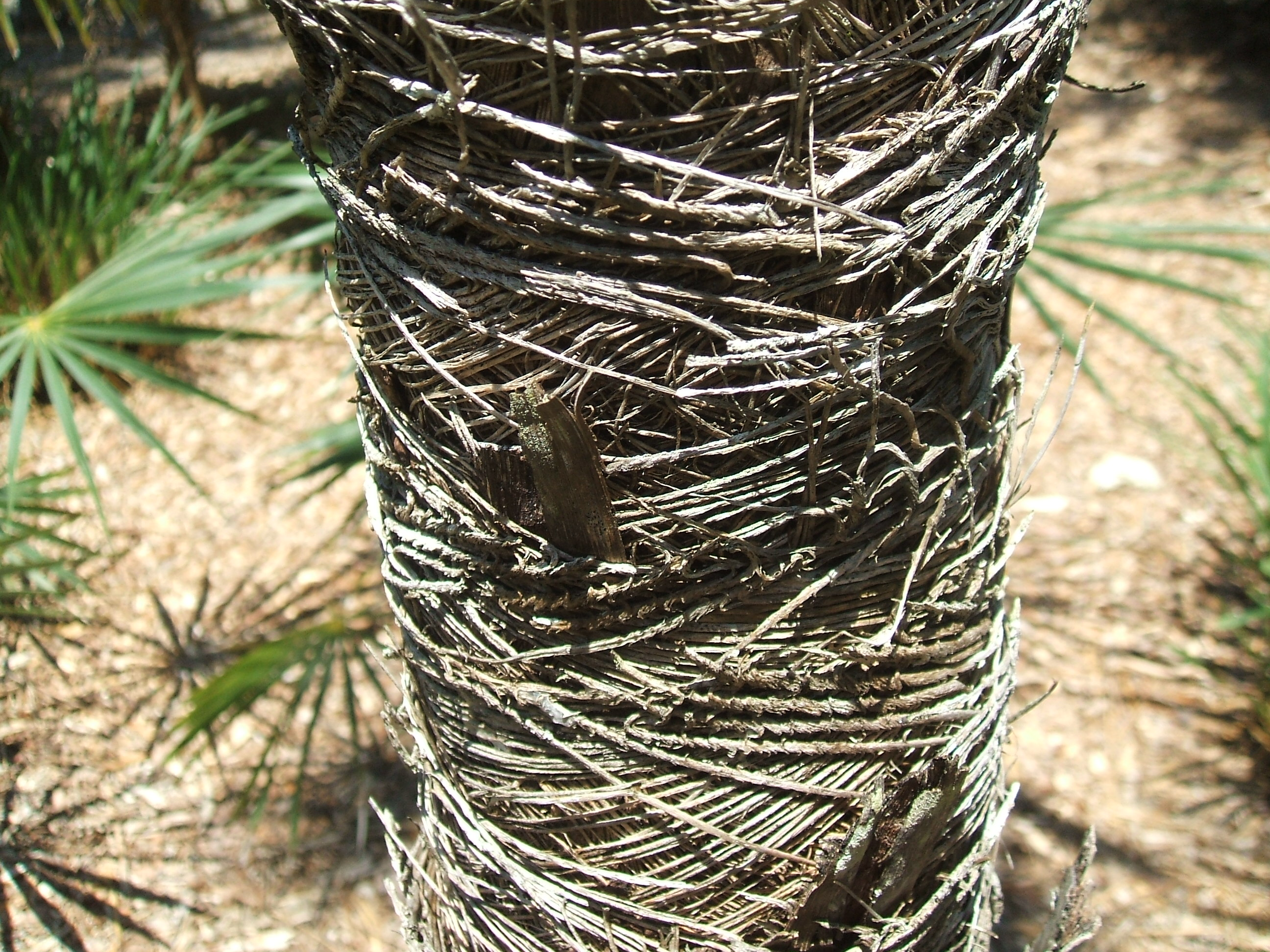
- Coccothrinax scoparia leaf sheaths

Scientific classification
- Kingdom: Plantae
- Clade: Tracheophytes
- Clade: Angiosperms
- Clade: Monocots
- Clade: Commelinids
- Order: Arecales
- Family: Arecaceae
- Genus: Coccothrinax
- Species: C. scoparia

Binomial name
- Coccothrinax scoparia Becc.

= Coccothrinax scoparia =

Species of palm

Coccothrinax scoparia is a palm which is endemic to Hispaniola.

Henderson and colleagues (1995) considered C. scoparia to be a synonym of Coccothrinax miraguama.
