= Coccothrinax fragrans =

Scientific classification
- Kingdom: Plantae
- Clade: Tracheophytes
- Clade: Angiosperms
- Clade: Monocots
- Clade: Commelinids
- Order: Arecales
- Family: Arecaceae
- Genus: Coccothrinax
- Species: C. fragrans

Binomial name
- Coccothrinax fragrans Burret

Species of palm

Coccothrinax fragrans is a palm which is native to eastern Cuba and Hispaniola.

== Information ==
Henderson and colleagues (1995) considered C. fragrans to be a synonym of Coccothrinax argentata.

== Description ==
Coccothrinax fragrans has dark green fan leaves with silvery undersides. It is a slow growing and stealthy palm when healthy. Coccothrinax fragrans is best suited to tropical and warm climates that do not get frost, and the palm is adaptable to coastal exposure.
