= Coccothrinax pauciramosa =

Conservation status
- Vulnerable (IUCN 2.3)

Scientific classification
- Kingdom: Plantae
- Clade: Tracheophytes
- Clade: Angiosperms
- Clade: Monocots
- Clade: Commelinids
- Order: Arecales
- Family: Arecaceae
- Genus: Coccothrinax
- Species: C. pauciramosa

Binomial name
- Coccothrinax pauciramosa Burret

Synonyms
- Coccothrinax muricata var. savannarum León; Coccothrinax muricata subsp. savannarum (León) Borhidi & O.Muñiz; Coccothrinax savannarum (León) Borhidi & O.Muñiz

Species of palm

Coccothrinax pauciramosa, the yuraguana or yuraguana vestida, is a palm which is endemic to Cuba. Like other members of the genus, C. pauciramosa is a fan palm. Trees are single-stemmed, between 2 and 5 metres tall (occasionally up 15 m tall) with stems 4 to 8 centimetres in diameter (occasionally up to 20 cm in diameter). The fruit is purple-black, 0.7–1.2 cm in diameter.

The species found in Camagüey, Holguín and Oriente provinces in eastern Cuba on limestone hills and serpentine savannas. It is classified as Vulnerable due to its small population and fragmented distribution.
