= Andrew Henderson (botanist) =

English botanist (born 1950)

Andrew J. Henderson
- Born: September 8, 1950 (age 75); Surrey, England
- Citizenship: United States
- Scientific career
- Fields: Botany, Palm systematics
- Institutions: Institute of Systematic Botany, New York Botanical Garden
- Author abbrev. (botany): A.J.Hend.

Andrew James Henderson (born September 8, 1950) is a palm-systematist and Curator of the Institute of Systematic Botany at the New York Botanical Garden. He has authored taxonomic descriptions of 140 species, subspecies and varieties of plants, especially in the palm family

== Education ==
Henderson was educated in Wycliffe College in Gloucestershire and Birkbeck College, University of London. In 1986, he received 'The George H.M. Lawrence Memorial Award', in the amount of $2,000, presented by the Hunt Institute for Botanical Documentation, Carnegie Mellon University and presented at the annual banquet of the Botanical Society of America. He later received his Ph.D. from City University of New York in 1987.

He joined the New York Botanic Garden in 1987.

== Works ==
He has authored several books, including The Palms of the Amazon and a field guide to the palms of the Americas.
