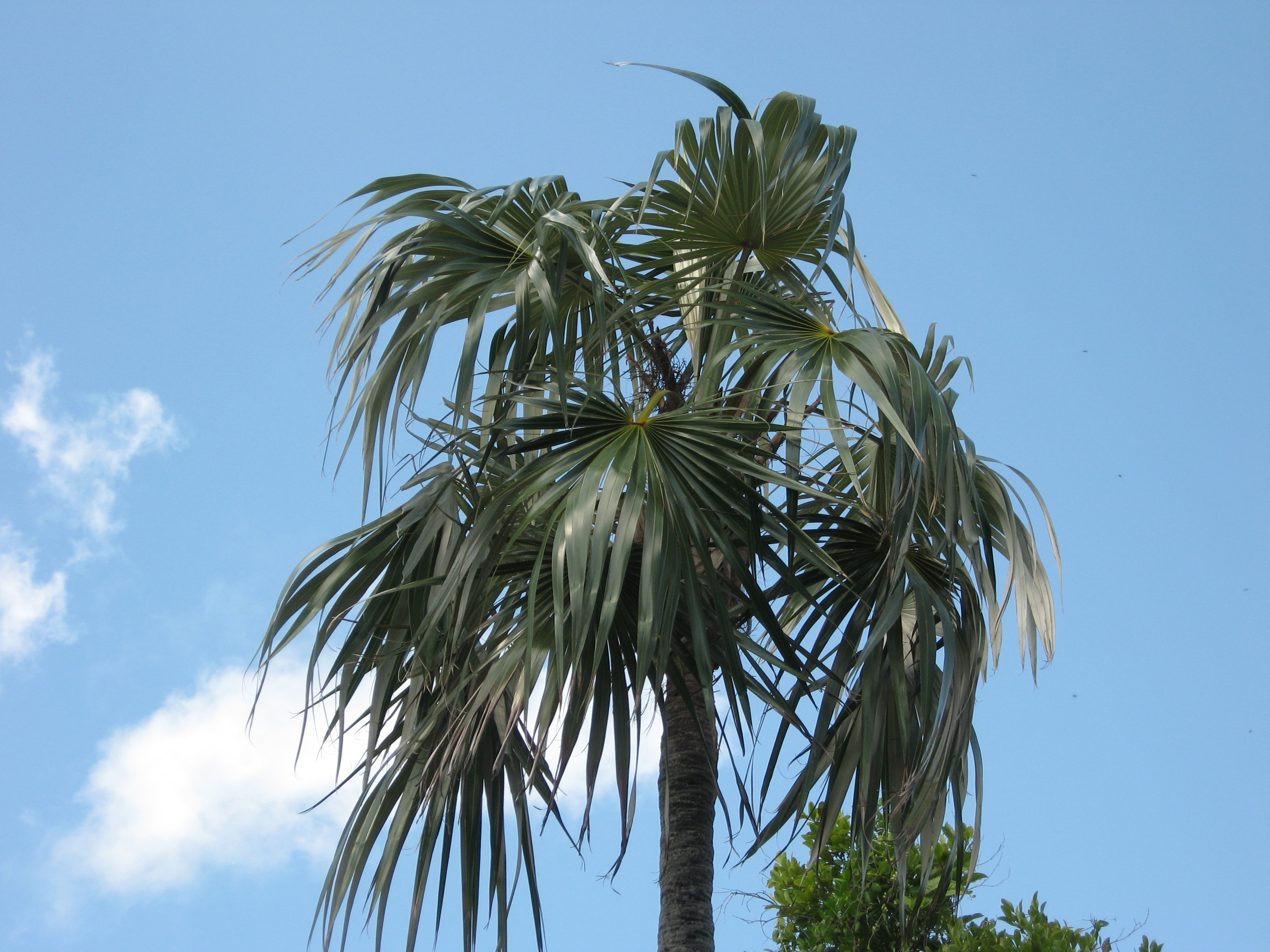
- Coccothrinax argentata, Bahia Honda Key, Monroe County, Florida

Conservation status
- Least Concern (IUCN 3.1)

- Apparently Secure (NatureServe)

Scientific classification
- Kingdom: Plantae
- Clade: Tracheophytes
- Clade: Angiosperms
- Clade: Monocots
- Clade: Commelinids
- Order: Arecales
- Family: Arecaceae
- Genus: Coccothrinax
- Species: C. argentata

Binomial name
- Coccothrinax argentata (Jacq.) L.H.Bailey

= Coccothrinax argentata =

Species of palm

Coccothrinax argentata, commonly called the Florida silver palm, is a species of palm tree. It is native to south Florida, southeast Mexico, Colombia and to the West Indies, where it is found in the Bahamas, the southwest Caribbean and the Turks and Caicos Islands. Its natural habitat is rocky, calcareous soil in coastal scrubland and hammock communities.

== Description ==
It is a small, slow-growing fan palm 2–6 meters (6.6–19.7 ft) tall with leaves that are dark blue-green above and silver-colored below. Measurements in Fairchild Tropical Garden showed an average growth rate of 12 centimeters (4.7 in) per year. Flowers are white and small on light orange branches. The fruits are globose and half an inch in diameter. They are initially green and turn purple or black when ripe.

Silver palms in their natural habitat often grow among saw palmetto (Serenoa repens) and cabbage palmetto (Sabal palmetto) which have similar fronds. Silver Palms can be distinguished by its smooth vertical trunk, and its small, crescent-shaped hastula.

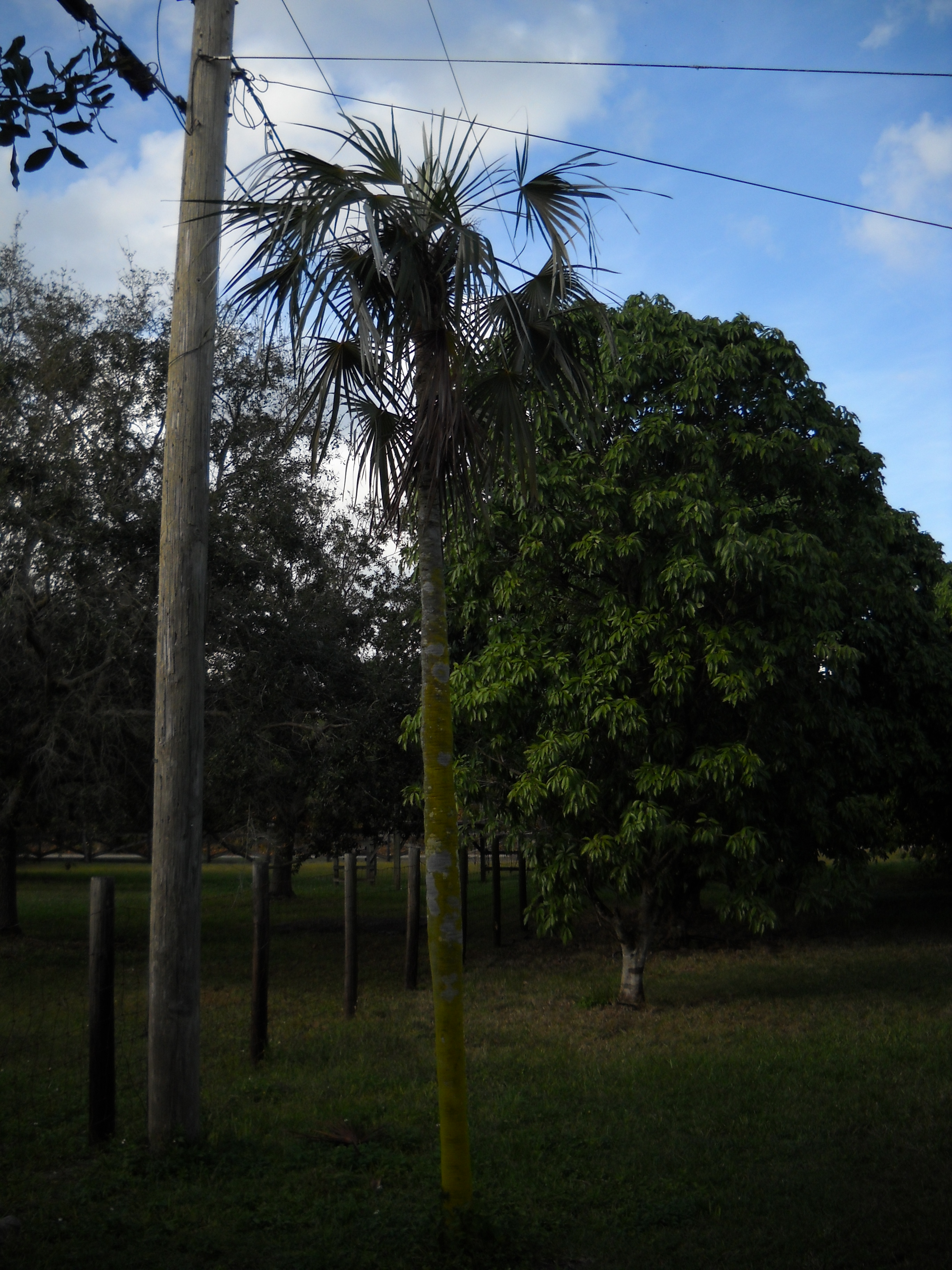
Coccothrinax argentata can be successfully grown in lawns and gardens

== Taxonomy ==
Coccothrinax argentata was first described in 1803 by Nikolaus Joseph von Jacquin as Palma argentata. It was transferred to the genus Coccothrinax by Liberty Hyde Bailey in 1939.

== Distribution and habitat ==
Coccothrinax argentata is native to Florida in the southeastern United States, southeast Mexico, Colombia, and parts of the Caribbean, where it is found in the Bahamas, Cuba, Jamaica, the Cayman Islands, Hispaniola (in the Dominican Republic), the southwest Caribbean, including the Colombian Caribbean islands, the Honduran Bay Islands and the Turks and Caicos Islands. Its natural habitat is rocky, calcareous soil, including coastal scrubland and hammock communities.

Populations on the Atlantic Coastal Ridge in Southern Florida are now recognized as Coccothrinax argentata subsp. garberi. This subspecies can be distinguished from Coccothrinax argentata subsp. argentata by shorter petioles and reduced stature.

Bahia Honda State Park in the Florida Keys has one of the largest stands of silver palms in the United States. They can be found on a nature walk just off of Sandspur Beach.

== Ecology ==
The endangered Key deer (Odocoileus virginianus clavium) are known to feed on the fruit of the silver palm.
