= Fan palm =

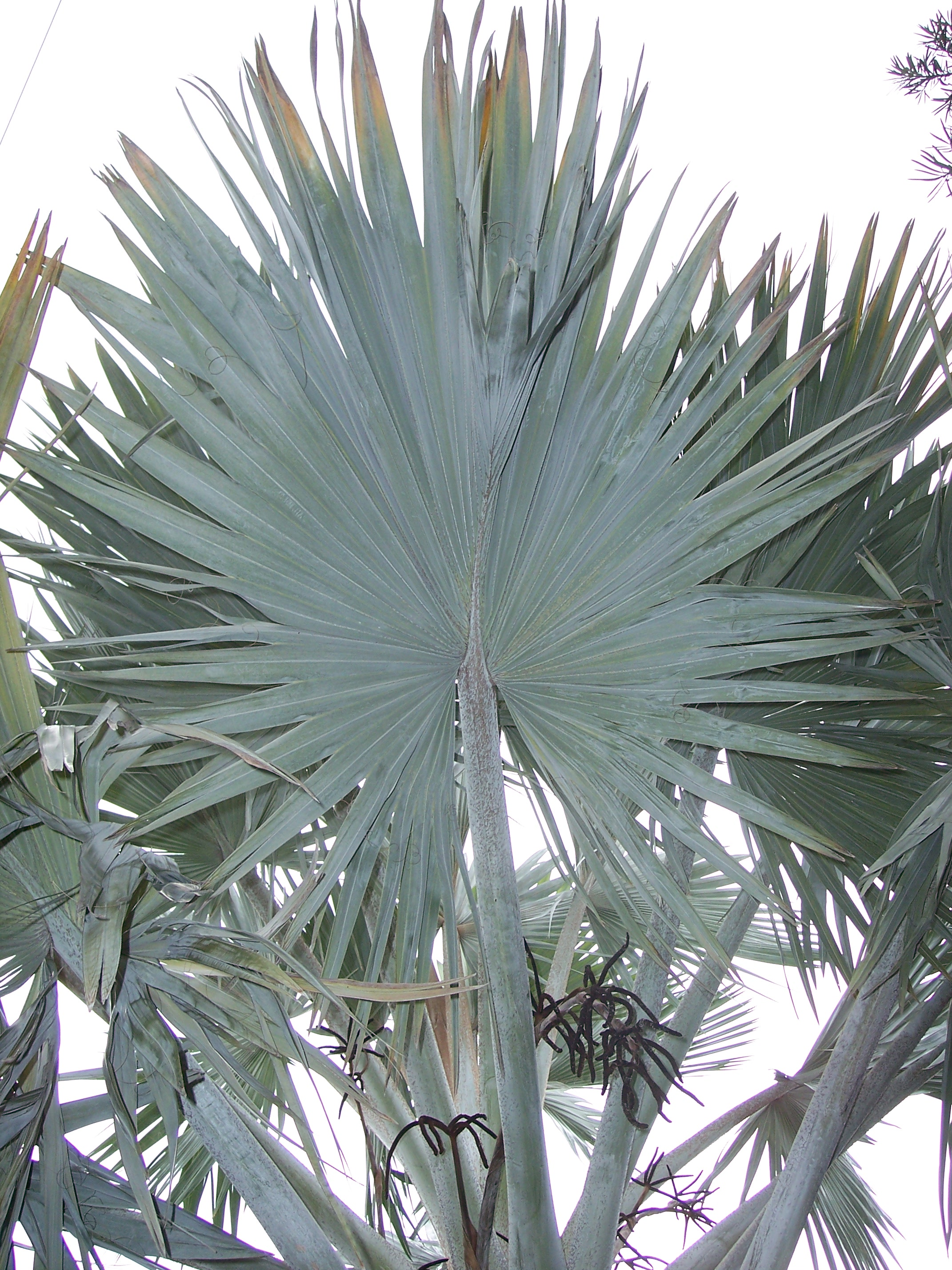
The typically palmately compound leaf of a fan palm (Bismarckia nobilis).

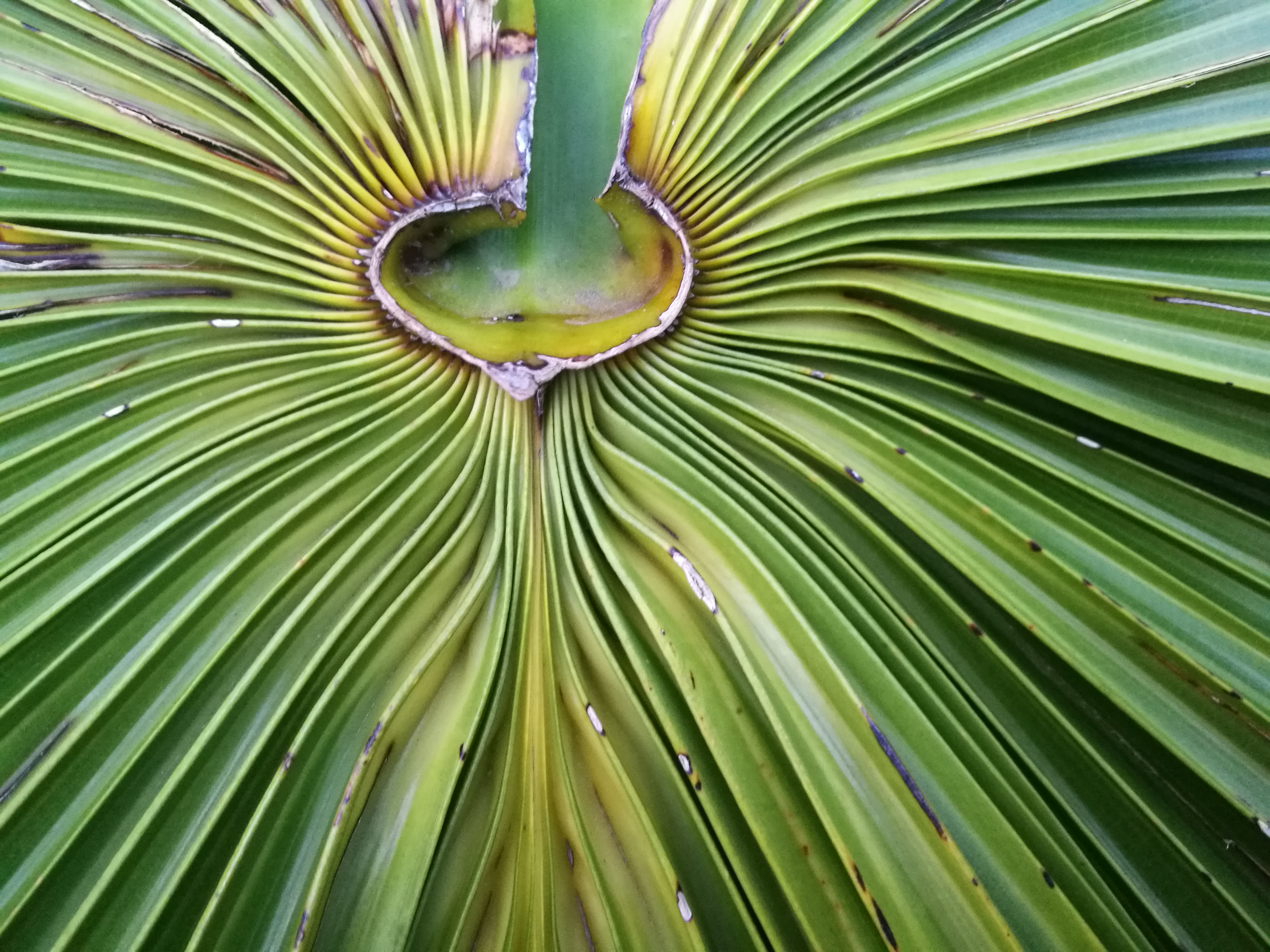
Detail of leaf from Livistona australis

Fan palm as a descriptive term can refer to any of several different kinds of palms (Arecaceae) in various genera with leaves that are palmately lobed (rather than pinnately compound). Most are members of the subfamily Coryphoideae, though a few genera in subfamily Calamoideae (Mauritia, Mauritiella and Lepidocaryum) also have palmate leaves. Fan palm genera include:

- Bismarckia
- Borassus
- Coccothrinax
- Copernicia
- Hyphaene
- Licuala
- Pritchardia
- Rhapidophyllum
- Rhapis
- Sabal
- Thrinax
- Trachycarpus
- Trithrinax

Fan palm can also be used as part of the common name of particular genera or species. Among the palms commonly known as fan palms are:

- Chamaerops humilis (European fan palm)
- Hyphaene petersiana (Real fan palm)
- Livistona (Chinese fan palm and others)
- Washingtonia (California fan palm, Mexican fan palm)
- Latania (Indian Ocean fan palms)

The travellers palm (Ravenala madagascariensis), Phenakospermum (P. guyannense), white bird of paradise (Strelitzia nicolai), and New Guinea fan palm (Cordyline fruticosa) are sometimes called fan palms, because of their leaves' distinctive shape; however none are members of the palm family (Arecaceae).

== See also ==
- Fan Palm Reserve
