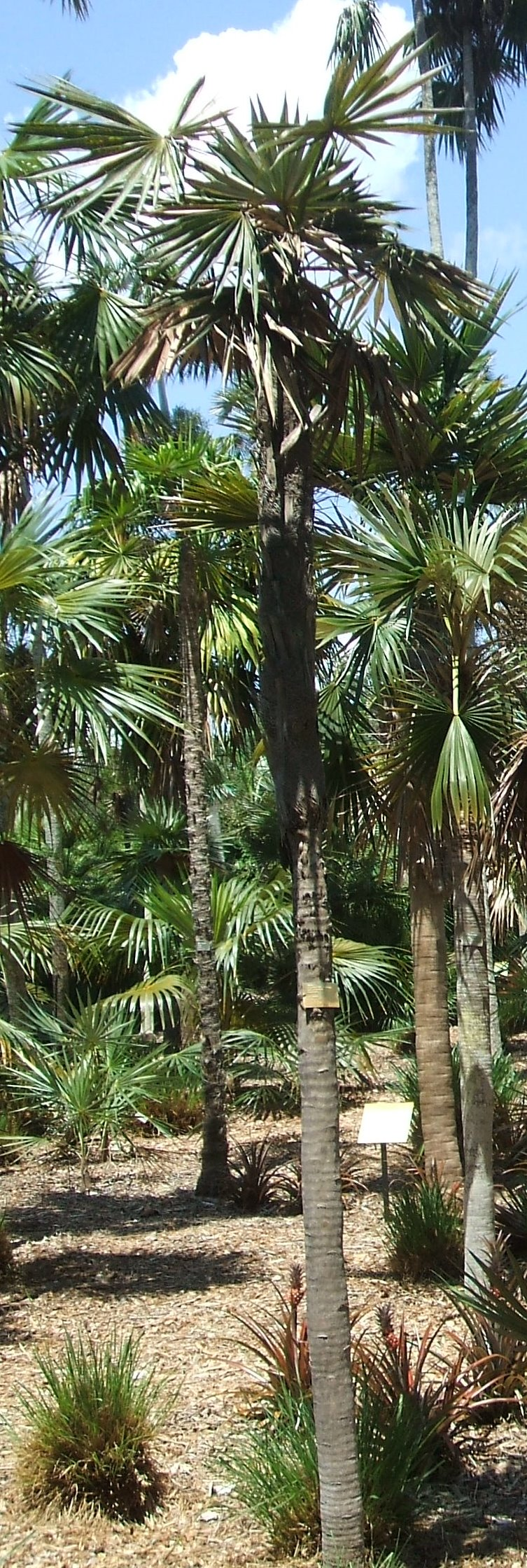
- Coccothrinax miraguama subsp. miraguama at Fairchild Tropical Botanic Garden, Coral Gables, Florida, United States.

Scientific classification
- Kingdom: Plantae
- Clade: Tracheophytes
- Clade: Angiosperms
- Clade: Monocots
- Clade: Commelinids
- Order: Arecales
- Family: Arecaceae
- Genus: Coccothrinax
- Species: C. miraguama

Binomial name
- Coccothrinax miraguama Borhidi & O.Muñiz

= Coccothrinax miraguama =

Species of palm

Coccothrinax miraguama is a palm which is endemic to Cuba.

Three subspecies are recognised: C. miraguama subsp. havanensis, C. miraguama subsp. miraguama, and C. miraguama subsp. roseocarpa.
