= Frère León =

French-born Cuban botanist (1871–1955)

- Born: December 31, 1871; Arbois, Jura, France
- Died: November 20, 1955 (aged 83); Cuba
- Scientific career
- Fields: Botany
- Author abbrev. (botany): León

Frère León (English: Brother León, Spanish: Hermano León; December 31, 1871 – November 20, 1955) was a French-born Cuban botanist and De La Salle Brother. Born Joseph Sylvestre Sauget in Arbois, Jura, León was an important contributor to the botanical exploration of Cuba and co-authored, with Frère Alain, the five-volume Flora of Cuba which remains the standard reference on the topic.

== Early life and education ==
Joseph Sylvestre Sauget was born in Arbois, Jura, in France on December 31, 1871. He obtained his secondary education in Dijon before joining the Institute of the Brothers of the Christian Schools and adopting the name León.

== Professional life ==
Frère León made extensive collections of Cuban plants, culminating with the production of the Flora of Cuba. He arrived in Cuba in 1905 after spending a year teaching in Canada. Working outward from his station in Havana, he engaged in a botanical exploration of the entire country. At that time, Cuba's flora was poorly recorded, and León's collections included many new species and new records for the island. Lacking a reference collection, León initially sent his specimens to Charles F. Baker, an American botanist based at the Agricultural Station at Santiago de Las Vegas. After Baker left Cuba, León corresponded extensively with Nathaniel Lord Britton at the New York Botanical Garden, grass specialists A. S. Hitchcock and Mary Agnes Chase at the United States Department of Agriculture, and fern specialist William Ralph Maxon at the United States National Museum.

León's collaborations with visiting plant collectors expanded the scope of his collections. Working with John Adolph Shafer in 1912, León was able to expand the range of his collecting. The arrival of Swedish botanist Erik Ekman in 1914 marked the beginning of a new phase in León's career as a botanist. Ekman, an avid plant collector, conveyed both his enthusiasm for collecting and his collecting methods to León. In 1916 León collected a grass species which was placed in a new genus, Saugetia (named in León's honour) by A. S. Hitchcock. Ekman remained in Cuba until 1924, when he left for Hispaniola. In 1938, León hosted the visit of Canadian botanist and fellow Lasallean Brother Marie-Victorin, with whom he engaged in further explorations of Cuba. Marie-Victorin returned to Cuba every winter until his death in 1944, and throughout this period he and León continued to research the island's flora.

Initially León focused on the grass family. He worked closely with Hitchcock as the latter prepared his Manual of the Grasses of the West Indies. In the 1920s León worked with Britton and Percy Wilson to produce a checklist of the Cuban flora which laid the groundwork for his Flora of Cuba. In 1928 he undertook a study of Cuban palms, which resulted in the description of several new species. His collections of mosses resulted in the publication of a catalogue of Cuban mosses in 1933. In the 1930s he focused on the cacti; his unfinished work on the family was incorporated into the third volume of the Flora of Cuba. In 1940 he began work on the Flora of Cuba. The first volume was published in 1947 and the second followed in 1951. His health and eyesight failing, León was unable to contribute further to the work, and died in 1955 before the final two volumes were completed. The work, completed by Frère Alain, remains the standard reference on the Cuban flora. León's extensive collections of Cuban plants are housed primarily at the Cuban Academy of Sciences.

== Awards and honours ==
Frère León received honorary doctorates from Columbia University in 1927 and the University of Havana in 1951. He was appointed an Officer of the National Order of Merit of Carlos Manuel de Cespedes by the government of Cuba, while the French government appointed him an Officier d'Instruction Publique in the Ordre des Palmes Académiques.
