= Attila Borhidi =

Hungarian botanist (born 1932)

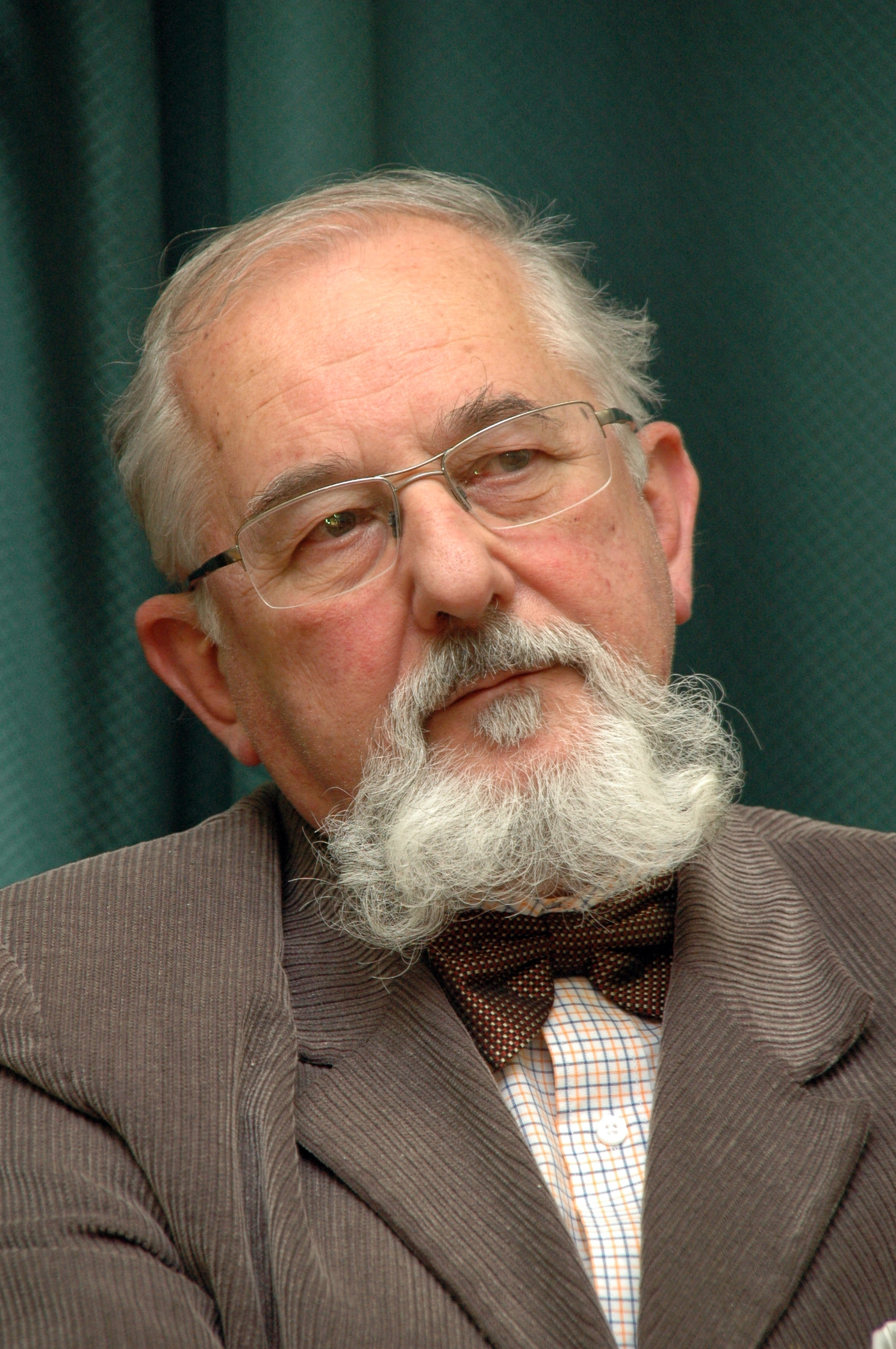

Attila Borhidi (born 28 June 1932) is a Széchenyi Prize winning Hungarian botanist, ecologist, professor, politician and full member of the Hungarian Academy of Sciences. He is most noted for his extensive work on plant taxonomy. 1989 to 1992, he was at the Janus Pannonius University Teacher Training Faculty, and from 1992 to 1994 the newly formed Faculty of Science. Between 1997 and 2002 he was Institute director of the Institute of Ecology and Botany. He is a member of the Batthyány Society of Professors.
