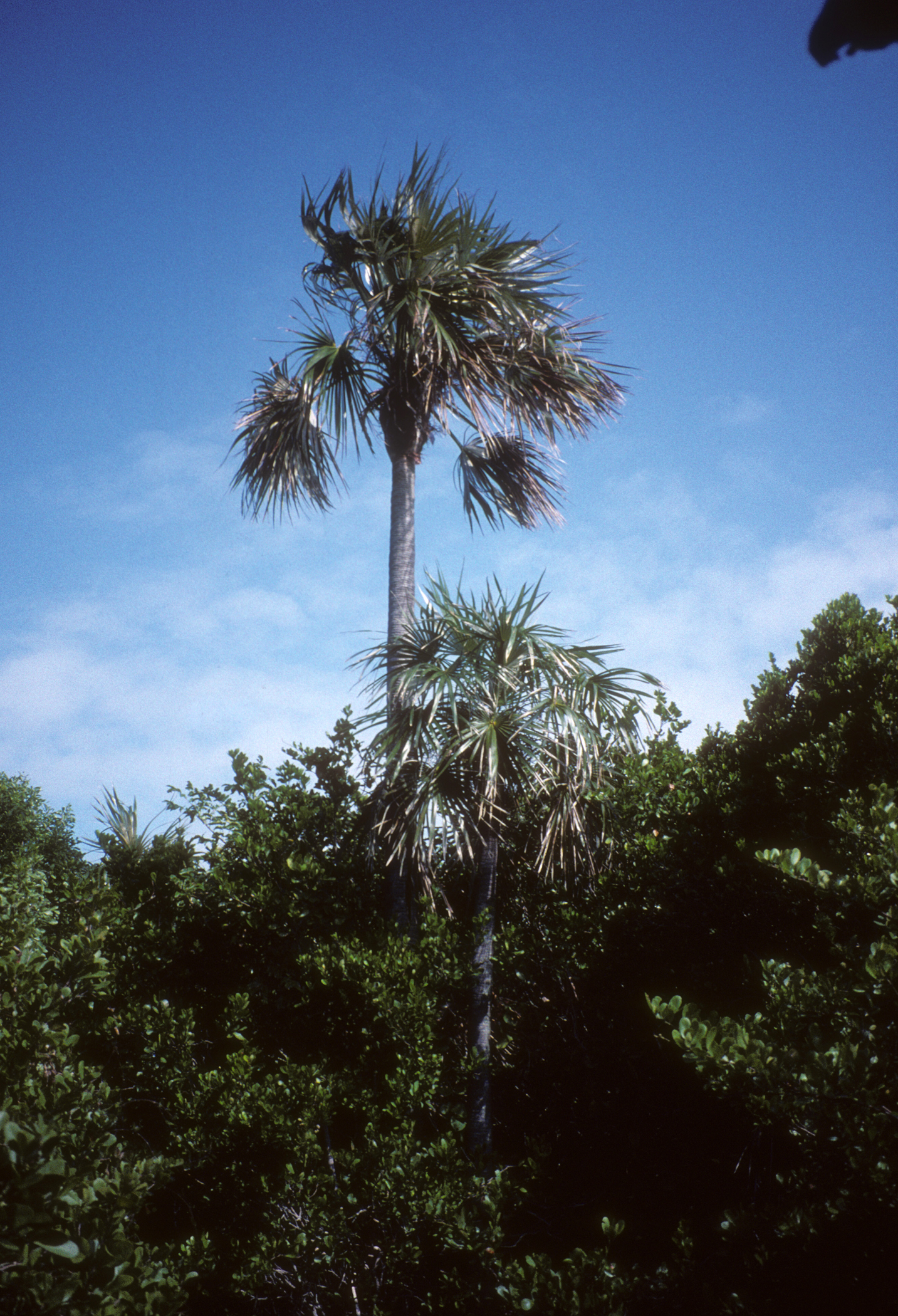
- C. argentata, Bahia Honda Key, Florida

Scientific classification
- Kingdom: Plantae
- Clade: Tracheophytes
- Clade: Angiosperms
- Clade: Monocots
- Clade: Commelinids
- Order: Arecales
- Family: Arecaceae
- Subfamily: Coryphoideae
- Tribe: Cryosophileae
- Genus: Coccothrinax; Sarg.

Type species
- C. argentata (Jacq.) L.H.Bailey

Diversity
- About 53 species

Synonyms
- Haitiella L.H.Bailey; Thrincoma O.F.Cook; Thringis O.F.Cook

= Coccothrinax =

Genus of palms

Coccothrinax is a genus of palms in the family Arecaceae. There are more than 50 species described in the genus, plus many synonyms and subspecies. A new species (Coccothrinax spirituana) was described as recently as 2017. Many Coccothrinax produce thatch. In Spanish-speaking countries, guano is a common name applied to Coccothrinax palms. The species are native throughout the Caribbean, the Bahamas, extreme southern Florida and southeastern Mexico, but most of the species are known only from Cuba.

== Description ==
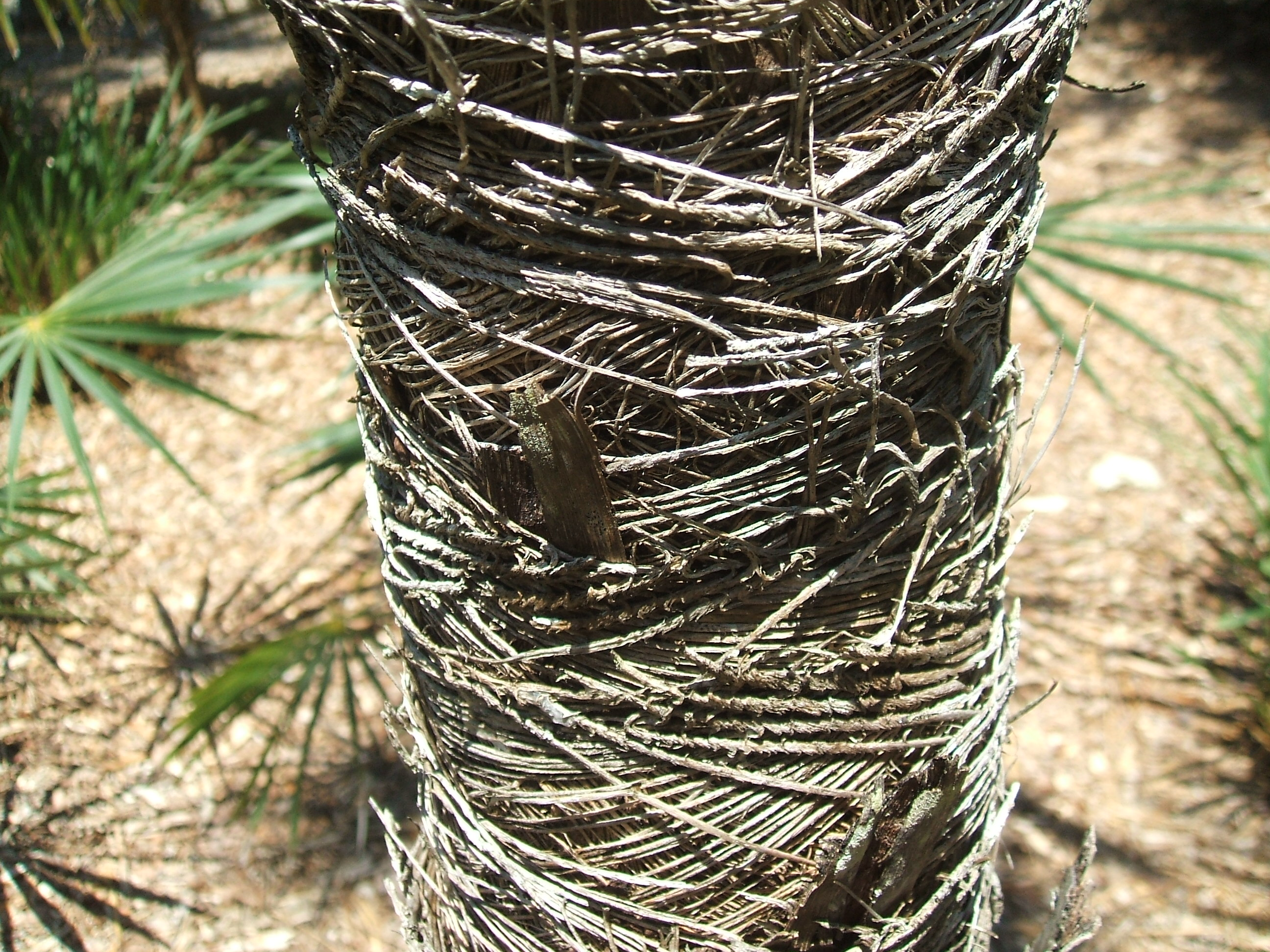
Detail of the stem of Coccothrinax scoparia showing fibrous leaf sheaths

Coccothrinax is a genus of small to medium-sized, fan palms with relatively slender stems and 8 to 22 palmate leaves. The stems are initially covered by fibrous leaf sheaths. These break down into a network of fibres or spines, eventually leaving a bare trunk covered with leaf scars. The undersides of the leaflets are often silvery-grey; this is reflected in the common name "silver palm", which is given to many species of Coccothrinax. The base of the petiole is not split longitudinally. The absence of this trait is a distinguishing character that separates Coccothrinax from Thrinax.

Coccothrinax species bear branched inflorescences that are located among the leaves. The bisexual flowers, which are borne on short stalks, have between 6 and 13 stamens and a single carpel. The fruit are small, single-seeded, and range in colour from purple-red to purple-black, to brown. The seeds are deeply grooved "and resemble a brain".

== Taxonomy ==
- Cryosophileae
  - Trithrinax
  - - - Itaya
      - Sabinaria
    - - Chelyocarpus
      - - Cryosophila
        - - - Schippia
            - - Thrinax
              - - Leucothrinax
                - Hemithrinax
          - - Zombia
            - Coccothrinax

Simplified phylogeny of the Cryosophileae based on four nuclear genes and the matK plastid gene.

The genus Coccothrinax was first described by American botanist Charles Sprague Sargent in 1899. He split the genus away from Thrinax based on characteristics of the fruit and seeds. The genus was based on Sargent's description of C. jucunda (now C. argentata) and C. garberi (also synonymised with C. argentata). He also assigned Thrinax argentea and T. radiata to the genus; while the former is now recognised as part of Coccothrinax, the latter remains in Thrinax. The generic epithet combines "coccus", the Latin word for berry, with Thrinax.

Coccothrinax is the most diverse genus of Caribbean palms. Although Andrew Henderson and colleagues only recognised fourteen species in their 1995 Field Guide to the Palms of the Americas, the current World Checklist of Arecaceae recognises 52 or 53 species.

Coccothrinax is placed in the tribe Cryosophileae.

== Distribution ==
Coccothrinax is a primarily Caribbean genus—it is found throughout the insular Caribbean, and in adjacent areas of Mexico and Florida. Species are usually found in dry, open or exposed habitats, on limestone, serpentine or sandy soils.

Coccothrinax argentata ranges from Florida and the Florida Keys, through the Bahamas and San Andrés Island to southeastern Mexico. Coccothrinax barbadensis ranges through the Lesser Antilles to Trinidad and Tobago and the Netherlands Antilles. The remaining species have narrower distributions; many are known from single populations in Cuba or Hispaniola.

== Botanic gardens ==
Large collections are grown in Fairchild Tropical Botanic Garden (more than 250 plants, more than 23 species), in Miami, Florida, Jardín Botánico Nacional (15 species) in Havana, Cuba, and Palmetum of Santa Cruz de Tenerife (more than 1,000 Thrinax and Coccothrinax plants), in the Canary Islands, Spain.
