= List of Attalea species =

Species in genus of palms

Experts disagree about the number of species in Attalea (broadly defined) a genus in the Arecaceae, the palm family. In 1965, Dutch taxonomist Jan Gerard Wessels Boer estimated that as many as 100 species may be in the genus. In their 1996 Field Guide to the Palms of the Americas Andrew Henderson and coauthors recognised 29 species in the genus, while Sidney Glassman recognised 65 species in his 1999 treatment of the group. Largely following Glassman's lead, Rafaël Govaerts and John Dransfield recognised 67 species in their 2005 World Checklist of Palms. An important element of this disagreement is the decision by Glassman to define species more narrowly than Henderson. As a result, what Henderson interpreted as variation within species, Glassman took as differences between morphologically similar species. This problem is complicated by the fact that many of these species are poorly represented in herbarium collections. The large size of the leaves, inflorescences and fruit of many Attalea species makes them difficult to collect. In addition, many important collections, including type specimens, have been lost or destroyed. Sparse or incomplete collections make it difficult to differentiate variation within a single species from variation between different species. Taxonomic uncertainty is exacerbated by frequent hybridisation between species.

== Varying accounts ==
The three recent treatments (Henderson and coauthors, Glassman, and Govaerts and Dransfield) recognised a total of 73 species, but only 20 species are accepted by all of them. The remainder account for either nine species or more than 40. For example, what Andrew Henderson considered a single species, Attalea attaleoides, other authors have considered a species complex consisting of four or five species. Glassman doubted the validity of A. attaleoides as a species, and described four new species from material that had previously been attributed to A. attaleoides—A. camopiensis, A. degranvillei, A. guianensis and A. maripensis. Govaerts and Dransfield accepted both Glassman's four species and A. attaleoides. However, Jean-Christophe Pintaud was of the opinion that A. guianensis, A. maripensis and A. attaleoides were all very similar, and thought it likely that they all represented the same species.

Another species complex in Attalea includes A. speciosa and related species. Henderson (1995) recognised A. speciosa and A. spectabilis, considering the latter to either be an acaulescent form of A. speciosa or a hybrid between A. microcarpa and it. Govaerts and Dransfield accepted A. spectabilis, but Glassman considered it a dubious taxon. Attalea vitrivir was recognised as a distinct species by Michael Balick and coauthors; Glassman and Govaerts and Dransfield concurred, but Henderson considered it part of A. speciosa. Glassman also described a fourth member of this group, A. brejinhoensis, and it is accepted by Govaerts and Dransfield.

== List ==
- Attalea allenii H.E.Moore
- Attalea amygdalina Kunth
- Attalea amylacea (Barb.Rodr.) Zona
- Attalea anisitsiana (Barb.Rodr.) Zona
- Attalea apoda Burret
- Attalea attaleoides (Barb.Rodr.) Wess.Boer
- Attalea barreirensis Glassman
- Attalea bassleriana (Burret) Zona
- Attalea brasiliensis Glassman
- Attalea brejinhoensis (Glassman) Zona
- Attalea burretiana Bondar
- Attalea butyracea (Mutis ex L.f.) Wess.Boer
- Attalea camopiensis (Glassman) Zona
- Attalea cephalotus Poepp. ex Mart.
- Attalea cohune Mart.
- Attalea colenda (O.F.Cook) Balslev & A.J.Hend.
- Attalea compta Mart.
- Attalea crassispatha (Mart.) Burret
- Attalea cuatrecasana (Dugand) A.J.Hend., Galeano & R.Bernal
- Attalea dahlgreniana (Bondar) Wess.Boer
- Attalea degranvillei (Glassman) Zona, Palms
- Attalea dubia (Mart.) Burret
- Attalea eichleri (Drude) A.J.Hend.
- Attalea exigua Drude
- Attalea fairchildensis (Glassman) Zona
- Attalea funifera Mart.
- Attalea geraensis Barb.Rodr.
- Attalea guacuyule (Liebm. ex Mart.) Zona
- Attalea guianensis (Glassman) Zona
- Attalea hoehnei Burret,
- Attalea huebneri (Burret) Zona
- Attalea humilis Mart. ex Spreng.
- Attalea iguadummat de Nevers
- Attalea insignis (Mart.) Drude
- Attalea kewensis (Hook.f.) Zona
- Attalea lauromuelleriana (Barb.Rodr.) Zona
- Attalea leandroana (Barb.Rodr.) Zona
- Attalea luetzelburgii (Burret) Wess.Boer
- Attalea macrocarpa (H.Karst.) Linden
- Attalea macrolepis (Burret) Wess.Boer
- Attalea magdalenica (Dugand) Zona
- Attalea maracaibensis Mart.
- Attalea maripa (Aubl.) Mart.
- Attalea maripensis (Glassman) Zona
- Attalea microcarpa Mart.
- Attalea moorei (Glassman) Zona
- Attalea nucifera H.Karst.
- Attalea oleifera Barb.Rodr.
- Attalea osmantha (Barb.Rodr.) Wess.Boer
- Attalea pacensis M.Moraes & Pintaud
- Attalea peruviana Zona
- Attalea phalerata Mart. ex Spreng.
- Attalea pindobassu Bondar
- Attalea plowmanii (Glassman) Zona
- Attalea princeps Mart.
- Attalea racemosa Spruce
- Attalea rhynchocarpa Burret
- Attalea rostrata Oerst.
- Attalea salazarii (Glassman) Zona
- Attalea salvadorensis Glassman
- Attalea seabrensis Glassman
- Attalea septuagenata Dugand
- Attalea speciosa Mart.
- Attalea spectabilis Mart.
- Attalea tessmannii Burret
- Attalea vitrivir Zona
- Attalea weberbaueri (Burret) Zona
- Attalea wesselsboeri (Glassman) Zona
