= A. princeps =

A. princeps may refer to:

- Accipiter princeps, the New Britain goshawk, a bird of prey species endemic to Papua New Guinea
- Actenoides princeps, the scaly-breasted kingfisher, a bird species endemic to Indonesia
- Anthene princeps, the cupreous hairtail, a butterfly species found in Africa
- Artemisia princeps, the Japanese mugwort, a perennial plant species found in Japan
- Attalea princeps, a palm species in the genus Attalea
