= American oil palm =

American oil palm can refer to:

- Species of Attalea, including
  - Attalea maripa, also called Maripa palm
- Elaeis oleifera
