= A. spicata =

A. spicata may refer to:

- Actaea spicata, the baneberry, Eurasian baneberry or herb Christopher, a flowering plant species native to Europe
- Amelanchier spicata, the thicket shadbush, low juneberry, dwarf serviceberry or low serviceberry, a plant species
- Anredera spicata, J. F. Gmelin, a species in the genus Anredera
- Artemisia spicata, a species in the genus Artemisia and ingredient found in Génépi
- Asterogyne spicata, a flowering plant species found only in Venezuela
- Austrotaxus spicata, the New Caledonia yew or southern yew, a plant species

== See also ==
- The dictionary definition of Spicata at Wiktionary
