= Asterogyne ramosa =

Conservation status
- Endangered (IUCN 3.1)

Scientific classification
- Kingdom: Plantae
- Clade: Tracheophytes
- Clade: Angiosperms
- Clade: Monocots
- Clade: Commelinids
- Order: Arecales
- Family: Arecaceae
- Genus: Asterogyne
- Species: A. ramosa

Binomial name
- Asterogyne ramosa (H.E.Moore) Wess.Boer

Synonyms
- Homotypic Synonyms: Aristeyera ramosa H.E.Moore

Species of palm

Asterogyne ramosa is a species of flowering plant in the family Arecaceae.

== Distribution and habitat ==
It is endemic to Venezuela. It is found in cloud forests at elevations between 730 and 1,250 meters.
