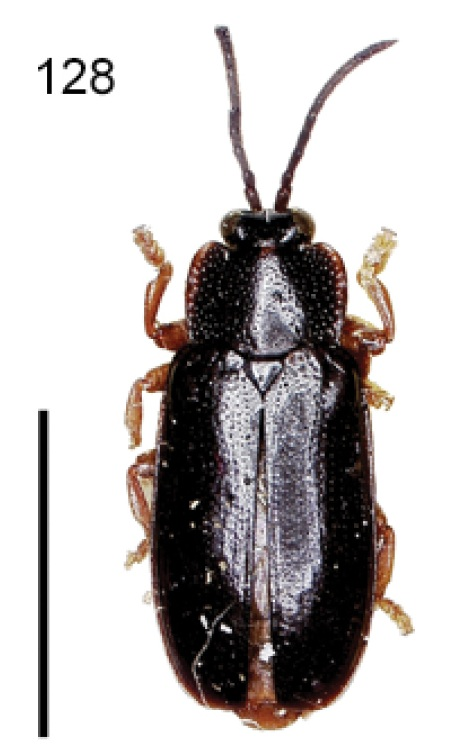

Scientific classification
- Kingdom: Animalia
- Phylum: Arthropoda
- Class: Insecta
- Order: Coleoptera
- Suborder: Polyphaga
- Infraorder: Cucujiformia
- Family: Chrysomelidae
- Genus: Cephaloleia
- Species: C. elaeidis

Binomial name
- Cephaloleia elaeidis Maulik, 1924

= Cephaloleia elaeidis =

Species of beetle

Cephaloleia elaeidis is a species of beetle of the family Chrysomelidae. It is found in Brazil (Bahia, São Paulo) and Ecuador.

== Description ==
Adults reach a length of about 4.5–5 mm. Adults are shining black, with the elytral and pronotal margins, legs and abdominal sterna pitchy-brown. Antennomeres 1–2 are also pitchy-brown, while 3–11 are darker.

== Biology ==
The recorded host plants are Elaeis guineensis and Geonoma species.
