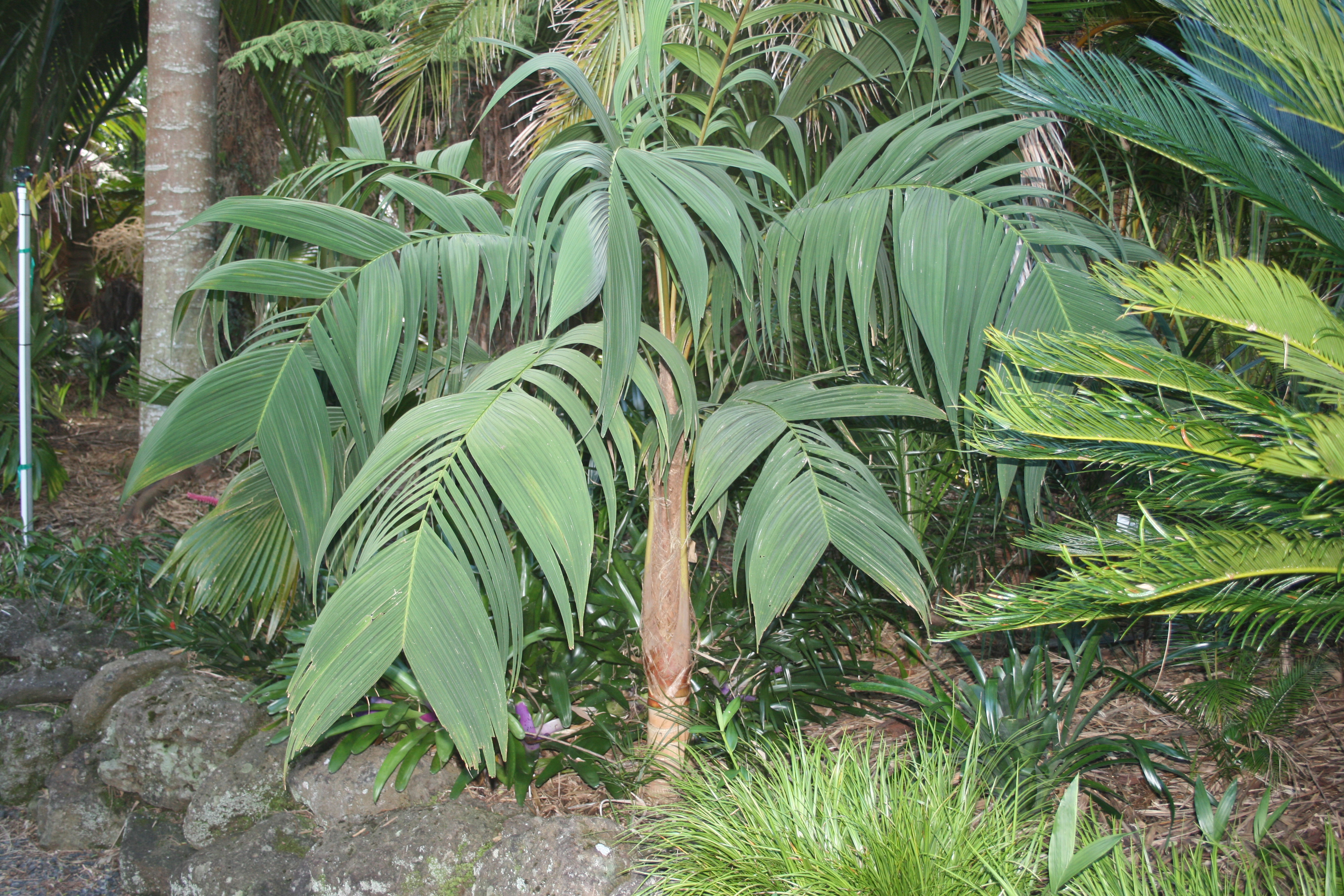
- Young Geonoma undata

Scientific classification
- Kingdom: Plantae
- Clade: Embryophytes
- Clade: Tracheophytes
- Clade: Spermatophytes
- Clade: Angiosperms
- Clade: Monocots
- Clade: Commelinids
- Order: Arecales
- Family: Arecaceae
- Subfamily: Arecoideae
- Tribe: Geonomateae
- Genus: Geonoma; Willd.

Species
- 64, see text

Synonyms
- Gynestum Poit. Kalbreyera Burret; Roebelia Engel; Taenianthera Burret; Vouay Aubl.

= Geonoma =

Genus of palms

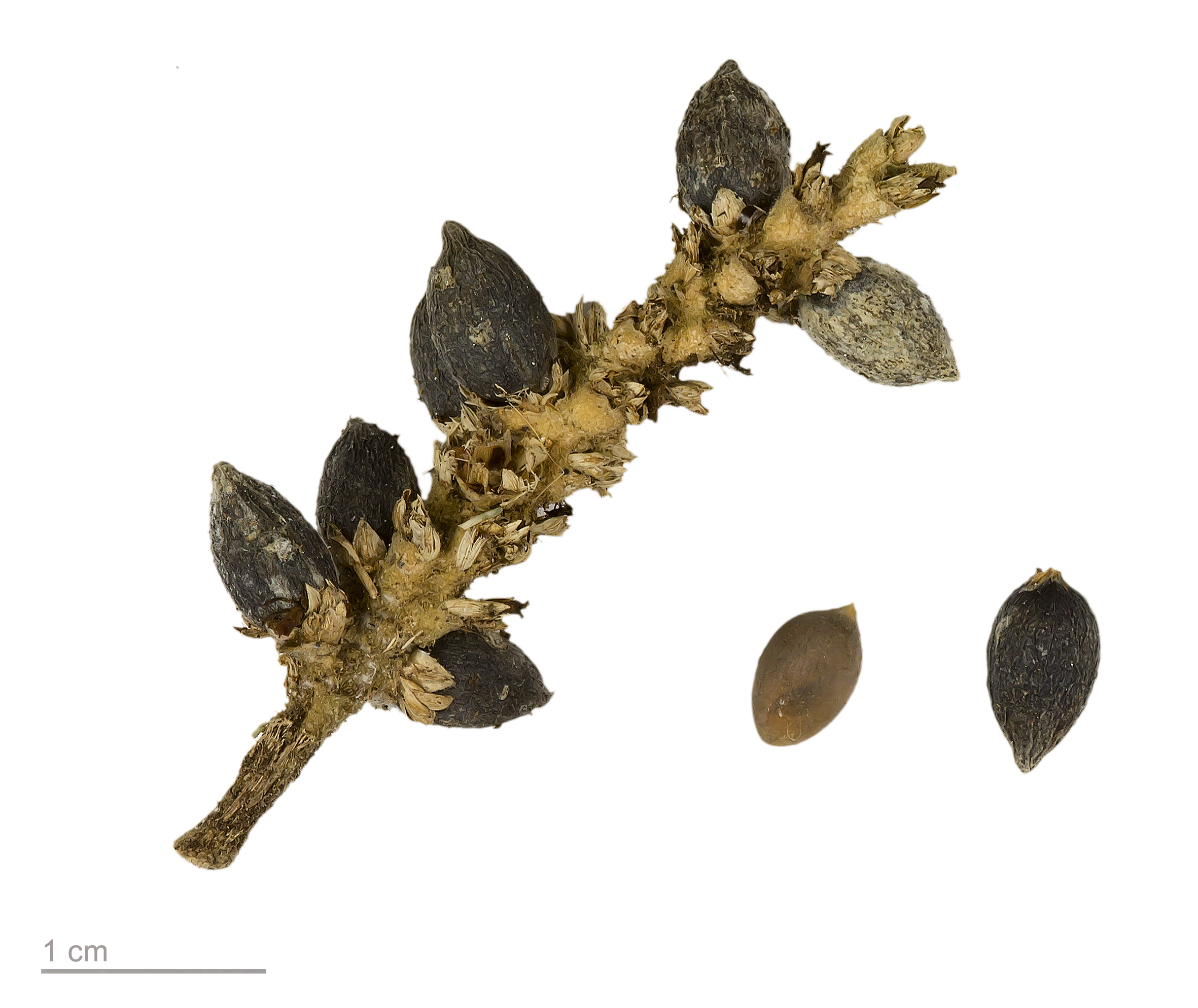
Geonoma stricta stricta - MHNT

Geonoma is a genus of small to medium-sized palms native to the forest understorey of tropical Central and South America.

This palm genus is one of the largest in the Neotropics. Its 64 species are distributed from Mexico and Haiti in the north to Paraguay in the south; two are found in the Lesser Antilles.

== Uses ==
In South America, the leaves of species such as Geonoma deversa, Geonoma orbignyana, and Geonoma macrostachys are economically important for their use in thatching roofs.

== Taxonomy ==
The genus is a member of the palm tribe Geonomateae (Arecaceae: Arecoideae), an important Neotropical group due to its wide distribution across Central and South America, its diversity and abundance, and the use of a number of species by local human populations. The distribution of the tribe Geonomeae stretches from southeast Mexico down through Central America and into South America, notably Brazil and Bolivia, and species are also found in the Greater and Lesser Antilles. This tribe consists of a group of understory and sub-canopy palms that populate both tropical lowland and montane forests. While members of this group are relatively easy to collect, as they are not canopy palms or spiny palms, and are well represented in herbaria, the taxonomy and phylogeny of the species within the tribe are still uncertain. The resolution of the tribe has been disputed despite the fact that Geonomateae species are characterized by three morphological synapomorphies: the petals of pistillate flowers are basally connate, the presence of slender and elongate styles, and the flowers are borne in pits in the rachillae.

== Species ==
The following species are currently recognized:

- Geonoma appuniana Spruce
- Geonoma arundinacea Mart.
- Geonoma aspidiifolia Spruce
- Geonoma atrovirens Borchs. & Balslev
- Geonoma baculifera (Poit.) Kunth
- Geonoma brenesii Grayum
- Geonoma brevispatha Barb.Rodr.
- Geonoma brongniartii Mart.
- Geonoma camana Trail
- Geonoma chlamydostachys Galeano-Garcés
- Geonoma chococola Wess.Boer
- Geonoma concinna Burret
- Geonoma congesta H.Wendl. ex Spruce
- Geonoma cuneata H.Wendl. ex Spruce
- Geonoma densa Linden & H.Wendl.
- Geonoma deversa (Poit.) Kunth
- Geonoma divisa H.E.Moore
- Geonoma epetiolata H.E.Moore
- Geonoma ferruginea H.Wendl. ex Spruce
- Geonoma frontinensis
- Geonoma gamiova Barb.Rodr.
- Geonoma gastoniana Glaz. ex Drude
- Geonoma hoffmanniana H.Wendl. ex Spruce
- Geonoma hugonis Grayum & Nevers
- Geonoma interrupta (Ruiz & Pav.) Mart.
- Geonoma irena Borchs.
- Geonoma jussieuana Mart. in A.D.d'Orbigny
- Geonoma laxiflora Mart.
- Geonoma leptospadix Trail
- Geonoma linearis Burret
- Geonoma longipedunculata Burret
- Geonoma longivaginata H.Wendl. ex Spruce
- Geonoma macrostachys Mart.
- Geonoma maxima (Poit.) Mart.
- Geonoma monospatha de Nevers
- Geonoma mooreana de Nevers & Grayum
- Geonoma myriantha Dammer
- Geonoma oldemanii Granv.
- Geonoma oligoclona Trail
- Geonoma orbignyana Mart. in A.D.d'Orbigny
- Geonoma paradoxa Burret
- Geonoma paraguanensis H.Karst.
- Geonoma pauciflora Mart.
- Geonoma poeppigiana Mart. in A.D.d'Orbigny
- Geonoma pohliana Mart.
- Geonoma polyandra Skov
- Geonoma polyneura Burret
- Geonoma rubescens H.Wendl. ex Drude
- Geonoma santanderensis Galeano & R.Bernal
- Geonoma schottiana Mart.
- Geonoma scoparia Grayum & Nevers
- Geonoma seleri Burret
- Geonoma simplicifrons Willd.
- Geonoma spinescens H.Wendl.
- Geonoma stricta (Poit.) Kunth
- Geonoma supracostata Svenning
- Geonoma talamancana Grayum
- Geonoma tenuissima H.E.Moore
- Geonoma triandra (Burret) Wess.Boer
- Geonoma triglochin Burret
- Geonoma trigona (Ruiz & Pav.) A.H.Gentry
- Geonoma umbraculiformis Wess.Boer
- Geonoma undata Klotzsch
- Geonoma weberbaueri Dammer ex Burret
- Geonoma wilsonii Galeano & R.Bernal
