= Attalea osmantha =

Scientific classification
- Kingdom: Plantae
- Clade: Tracheophytes
- Clade: Angiosperms
- Clade: Monocots
- Clade: Commelinids
- Order: Arecales
- Family: Arecaceae
- Genus: Attalea
- Species: A. osmantha

Binomial name
- Attalea osmantha (Barb. Rodr.) Wess.Boer

Synonyms
- Scheelea osmantha Barb.Rodr. Scheelea urbaniana Burret; Scheelea curvifrons L.H.Bailey

Species of palm

Attalea osmantha (considered a synonym of the more widespread Attalea butyracea by some authors) is a large pinnately leaved palm found in Trinidad and Tobago and northern Venezuela.
