= Attalea huebneri =

Scientific classification
- Kingdom: Plantae
- Clade: Tracheophytes
- Clade: Angiosperms
- Clade: Monocots
- Clade: Commelinids
- Order: Arecales
- Family: Arecaceae
- Genus: Attalea
- Species: A. huebneri

Binomial name
- Attalea huebneri (Burret) Zona

Synonyms
- Scheelea huebneri Burret

Species of palm

Attalea huebneri is a species of palm tree native to the Amazon rainforest of Brazil, Peru and Colombia.
