= Asterogyne spicata =

Conservation status
- Vulnerable (IUCN 3.1)

Scientific classification
- Kingdom: Plantae
- Clade: Tracheophytes
- Clade: Angiosperms
- Clade: Monocots
- Clade: Commelinids
- Order: Arecales
- Family: Arecaceae
- Genus: Asterogyne
- Species: A. spicata

Binomial name
- Asterogyne spicata (H.E.Moore) Wess.Boer

Synonyms
- Homotypic Synonyms: Aristeyera spicata H.E.Moore

Species of palm

Asterogyne spicata is a species of flowering plant in the family Arecaceae.

== Distribution and habitat ==
It is endemic to Venezuela and is threatened by habitat loss. It is found in the understory of evergreen rain forests and cloud forests, at elevations between 200 and 1,100 meters.
