= Attalea tessmannii =

Conservation status
- Near Threatened (IUCN 2.3)

Scientific classification
- Kingdom: Plantae
- Clade: Tracheophytes
- Clade: Angiosperms
- Clade: Monocots
- Clade: Commelinids
- Order: Arecales
- Family: Arecaceae
- Genus: Attalea
- Species: A. tessmannii

Binomial name
- Attalea tessmannii Burret

Species of palm

Attalea tessmannii is a species of flowering plant in the family Arecaceae. It is found in Brazil and Peru. It is threatened by habitat loss.
