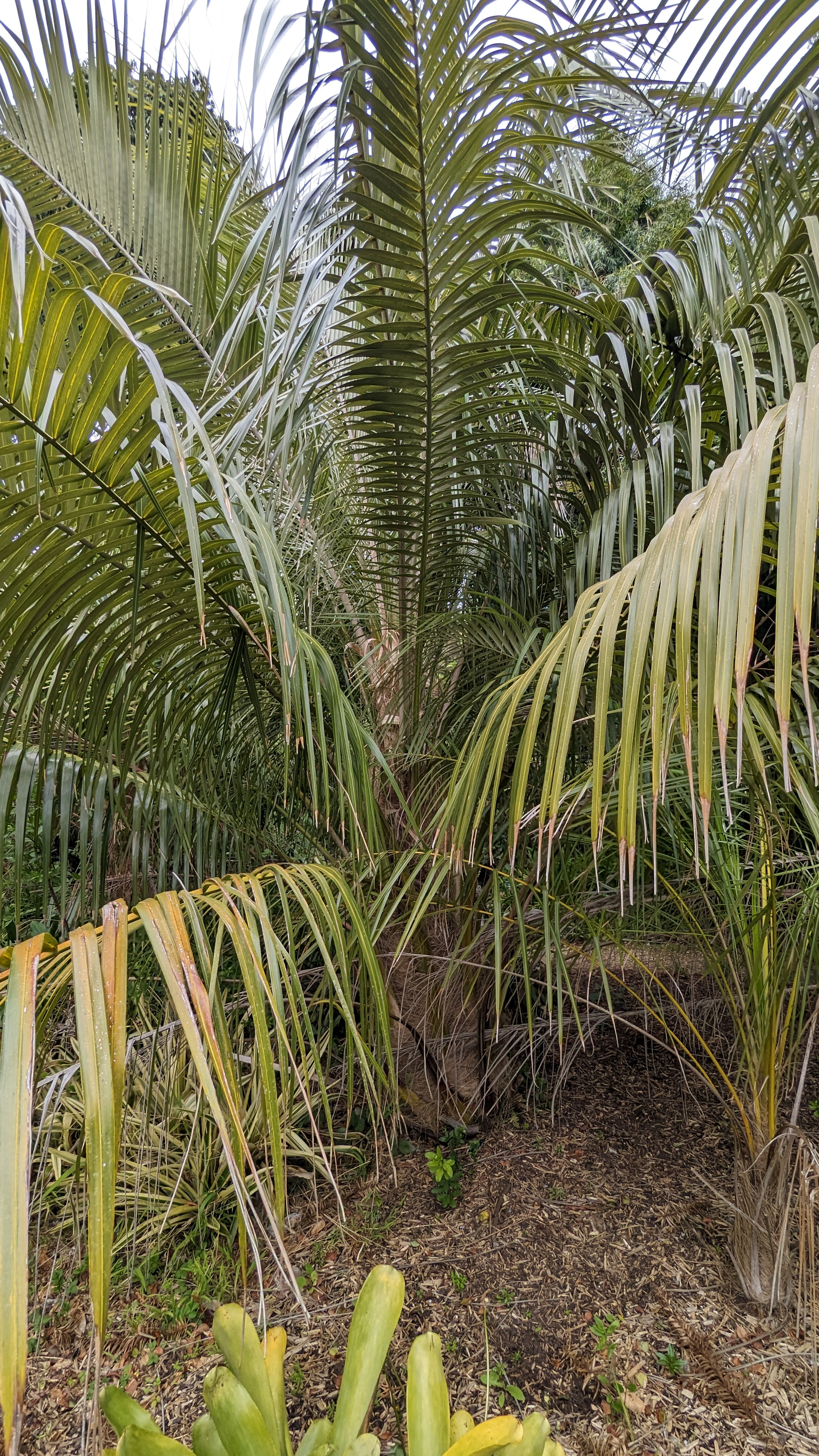

Conservation status
- Endangered (IUCN 3.1)

Scientific classification
- Kingdom: Plantae
- Clade: Tracheophytes
- Clade: Angiosperms
- Clade: Monocots
- Clade: Commelinids
- Order: Arecales
- Family: Arecaceae
- Genus: Parajubaea
- Species: P. sunkha

Binomial name
- Parajubaea sunkha Moraes

= Parajubaea sunkha =

Species of palm

Parajubaea sunkha is a species of palm tree. It is endemic to Bolivia, South America. Its common names include Sunkha palm and palma de Zunkha.

This palm grows in valley in the Andes at elevations of 1700 to 2500 meters. It is part of the forest canopy. Rodents disperse the seeds. It easily regenerates in its natural habitat, but not when it is disturbed.

Fiber from the leaf axils is harvested for use in rope and mattresses. The leaves and fruits are fed to livestock.
