= Geonoma irena =

Conservation status
- Endangered (IUCN 3.1)

Scientific classification
- Kingdom: Plantae
- Clade: Embryophytes
- Clade: Tracheophytes
- Clade: Spermatophytes
- Clade: Angiosperms
- Clade: Monocots
- Clade: Commelinids
- Order: Arecales
- Family: Arecaceae
- Genus: Geonoma
- Species: G. irena

Binomial name
- Geonoma irena Borchs.

Species of palm

Geonoma irena is a species of palm tree. It is endemic to Ecuador. It grows in coastal forest habitat that is undergoing degradation and deforestation.
