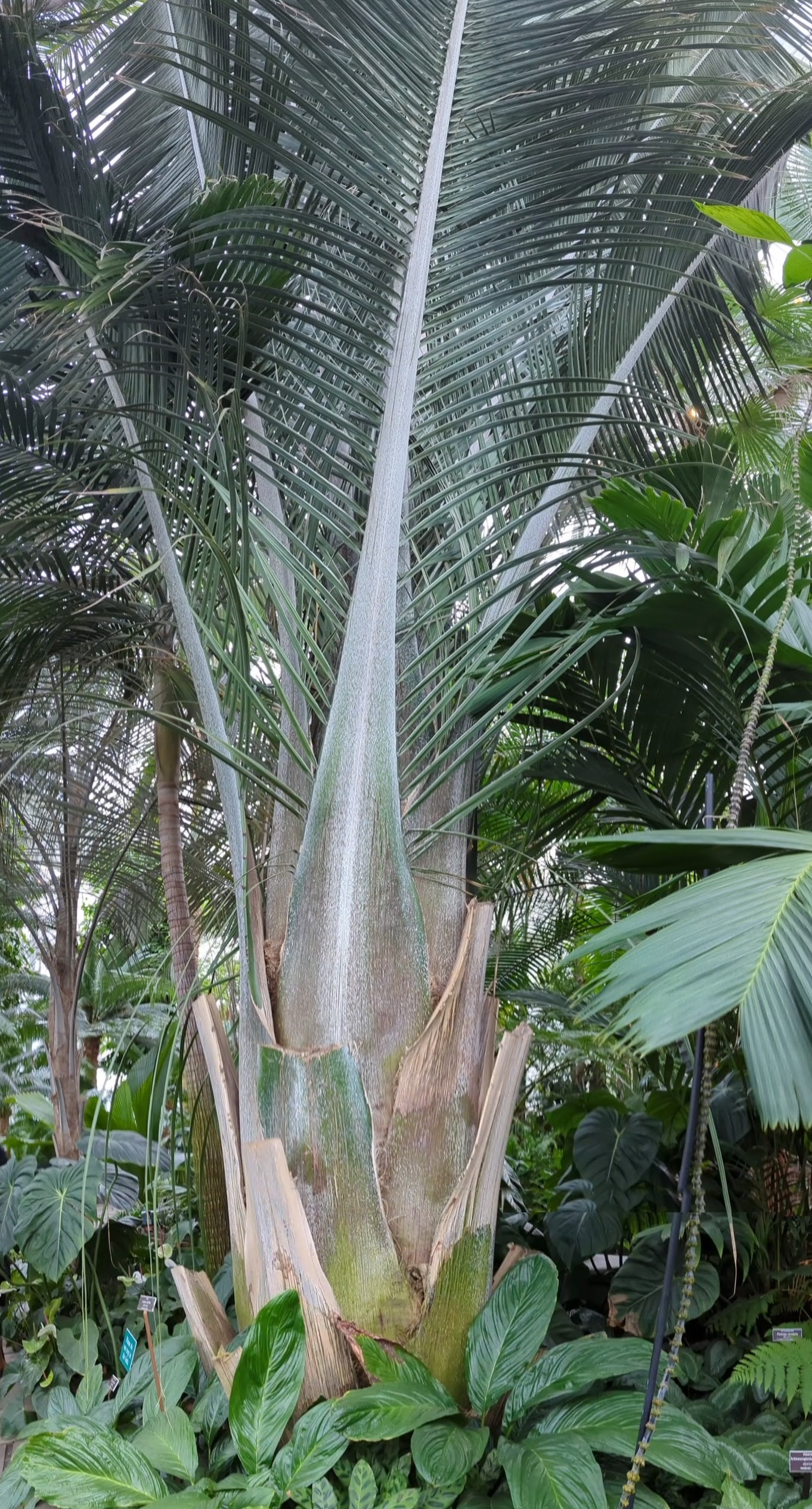
- In the New York Botanical Gardens

Conservation status
- Least Concern (IUCN 3.1)

Scientific classification
- Kingdom: Plantae
- Clade: Tracheophytes
- Clade: Angiosperms
- Clade: Monocots
- Clade: Commelinids
- Order: Arecales
- Family: Arecaceae
- Genus: Attalea
- Species: A. oleifera

Binomial name
- Attalea oleifera Barb.Rodr.

Synonyms
- Attalea burretiana Bondar; Attalea concentrista Bondar

= Attalea oleifera =

Species of palm

Attalea oleifera is a species of flowering plant in the family Arecaceae. It is a palm tree which grows up to 25 meters tall. It is endemic to eastern Brazil, ranging from Paraíba to northern Espírito Santo, where it grows in Cerrado savanna and seasonally-dry semi-deciduous Atlantic Forest.
