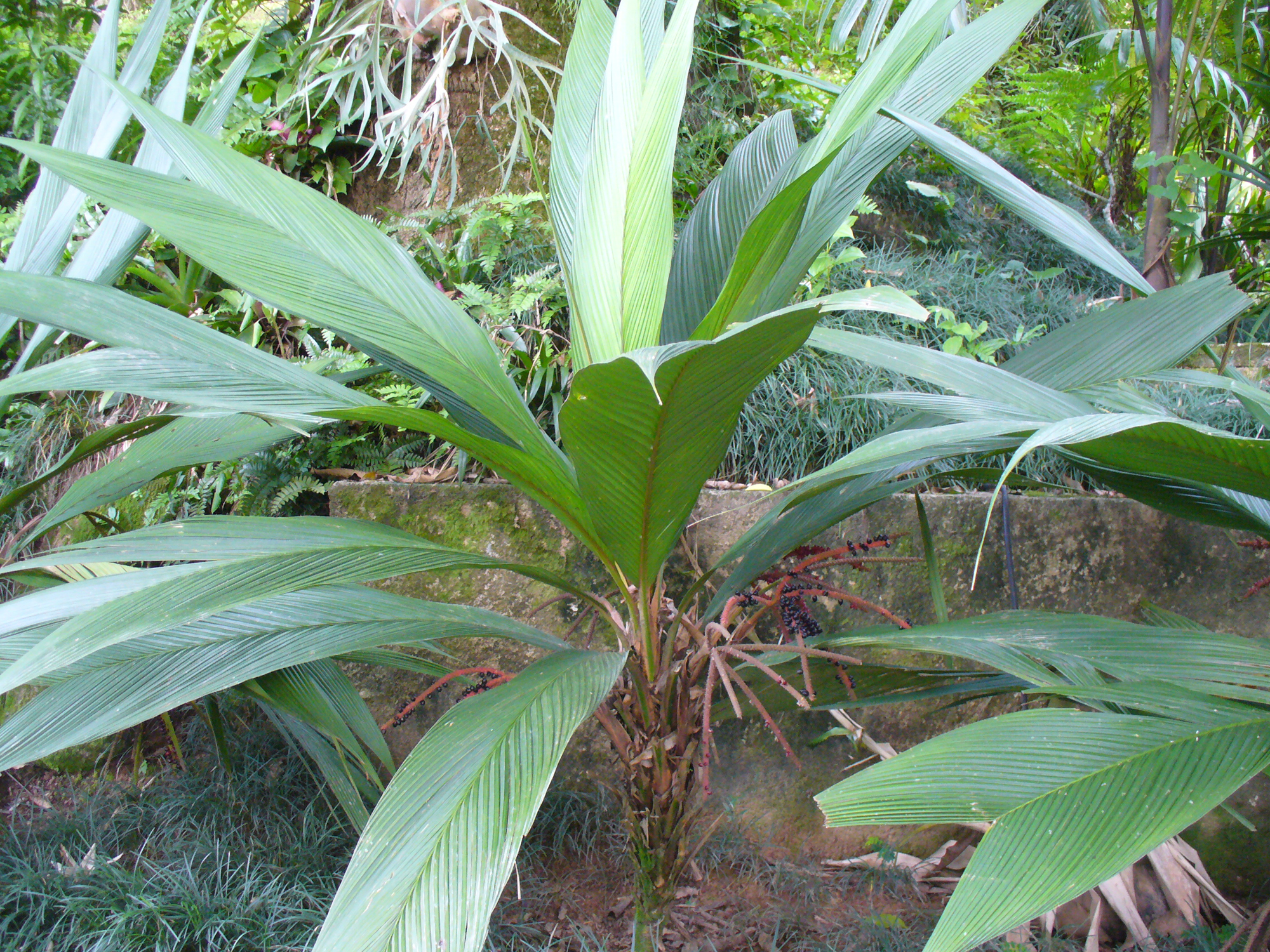
- Asterogyne martiana

Scientific classification
- Kingdom: Plantae
- Clade: Tracheophytes
- Clade: Angiosperms
- Clade: Monocots
- Clade: Commelinids
- Order: Arecales
- Family: Arecaceae
- Subfamily: Arecoideae
- Tribe: Geonomateae
- Genus: Asterogyne; H.Wendl. ex Hook.f.

Synonyms
- Aristeyera H.E.Moore

= Asterogyne =

Genus of palms

Asterogyne is a genus of flowering plant in the family Arecaceae native to Central America and northern South America, with three of the five known species endemic to Venezuela.

It contains the following species:

- Asterogyne guianensis Granv. & A.J.Hend. - French Guiana
- Asterogyne martiana (H.Wendl.) H.Wendl. ex Drude - Colombia, Ecuador, Central America from Belize to Panama
- Asterogyne ramosa (H.E.Moore) Wess.Boer - Paria Peninsula in Venezuela
- Asterogyne spicata (H.E.Moore) Wess.Boer - Miranda State in Venezuela
- Asterogyne yaracuyense A.J.Hend. & Steyerm. - Cerro La Chapa in Lara State in Venezuela
