= Geonoma maxima =

Scientific classification
- Kingdom: Plantae
- Clade: Tracheophytes
- Clade: Angiosperms
- Clade: Monocots
- Clade: Commelinids
- Order: Arecales
- Family: Arecaceae
- Genus: Geonoma
- Species: G. maxima

Binomial name
- Geonoma maxima (Poit.) Kunth

Species of palm

Geonoma maxima is a species of palm tree native to South America.
