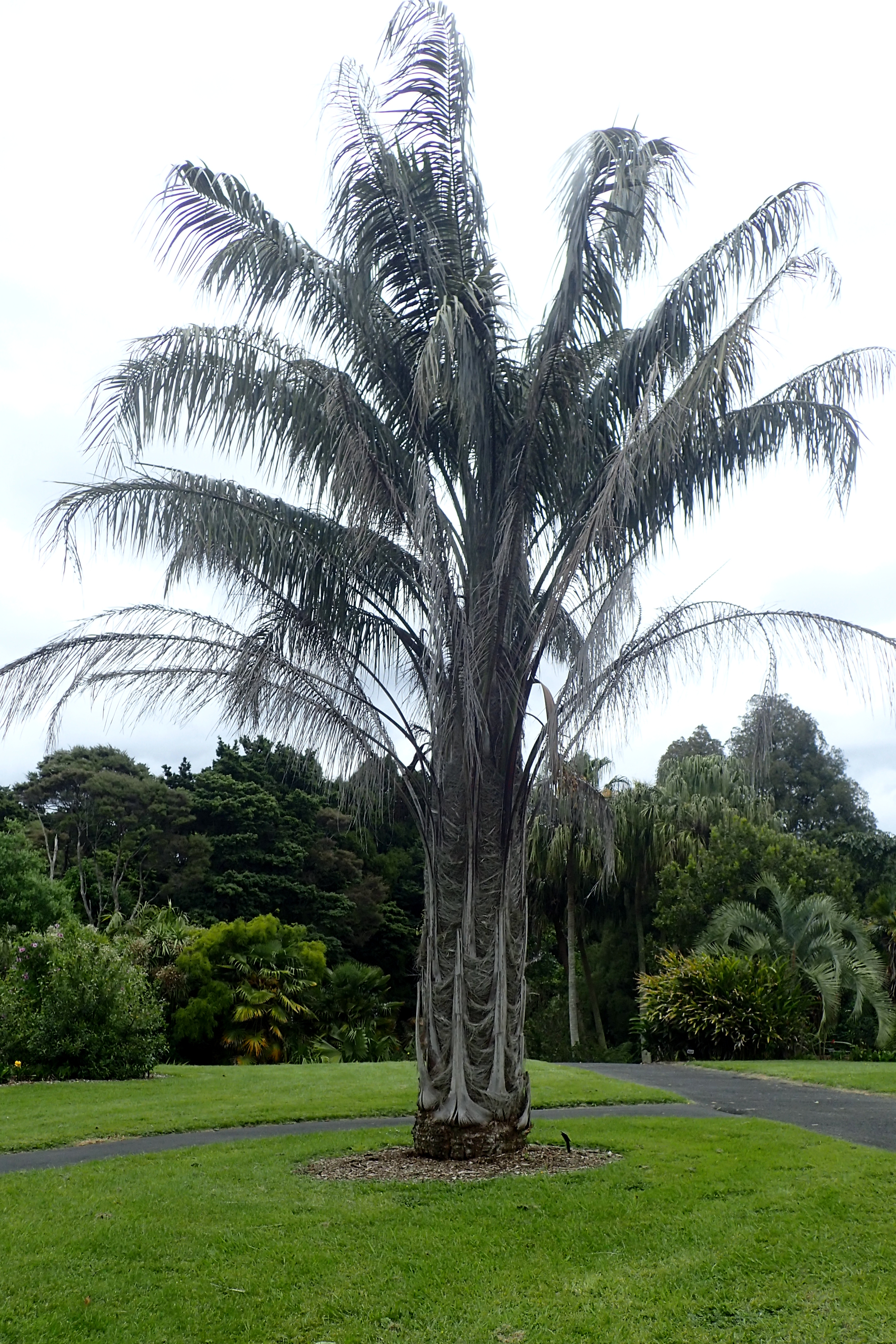

Conservation status
- Endangered (IUCN 3.1)

Scientific classification
- Kingdom: Plantae
- Clade: Tracheophytes
- Clade: Angiosperms
- Clade: Monocots
- Clade: Commelinids
- Order: Arecales
- Family: Arecaceae
- Genus: Parajubaea
- Species: P. torallyi

Binomial name
- Parajubaea torallyi (Mart.) Burret

Synonyms
- Allagoptera torallyi (Mart.) Kuntze; Diplothemium torallyi Mart.; Jubaea torallyi (Mart.) H.Wendl.; Polyandrococos torallyi (Mart.) Barb.Rodr.

= Parajubaea torallyi =

Species of palm

Parajubaea torallyi, commonly known as the palma de Pasobaya or Bolivian mountain coconut, is a species of evergreen flowering plant of genus Parajubaea, in the family Arecaceae, closely related to the coconut palm in the tribe Cocoseae.

It is endemic to Bolivia, where it grows in dry forests on steep rocky slopes at 2,400–3,400 metres (7,900–11,200 ft) in elevation. In its native habitat, due to high elevation, low night temperatures often drop to a range of -3C to -9C during local winter time (July, August), with considerable temperature spans between day and night and practically no precipitation during that time. Annual rainfall is around 500-600mm only, with majority during 2-3 months of the year. The palm therefore naturally occurs only in some valleys that have waterlines available within stony and sandy mountain ground for deep root access. Humidity in these micro climate valleys is quite high despite low precipitation, which might contribute to relief from heat stress by acquiring water over the leaves.

It is cultivated in parks and alleys for its stunning ornamental properties united to its cold hardiness. Plants reach 10-15 meters in height and a trunk diameter of 25-50 cm. Leaves length will reach up to 4-5 meters within a crown of 10-15 pinnate leaves. Overall appearance stunningly resembles the tropical coconut palm in many features, i.e leaves, trunk, fruit structure including milk, hence its nickname "Bolivian Mountain Coconut".

In cultivation it prefers a mild or cool climate and a neutral to acidic soil, and it tolerates droughts but not excess of water. Specifically it needs soil kept dry in order to withstand very low temperatures unharmed (up to -9C, below this point the palm might survive, but lose all its leaves before recovering for months), whereas it will thrive in hot summer weather only when watered regularly or equivalent ground water access. Normal garden soil is usually sufficient, but light and sandy soils are preferred over lime and cloggy substrates. Specimens have been successfully planted out in subtropical and warm temperature regions, such as (North and South) California, Spain, Portugal, Italy and even southern Switzerland (Tessin). It has shown not to grow well or even survive in climates too cold or too hot and humid (i.e. South Florida, Hawaii). Night frost is tolerated if daytime temperatures are above frost high enough to recover. The palm is used to 15-25C temperature changes between day and night from its natural habitat, but steady frost for day and night requires heating and other protection methods like thermal covers at least as long as severe frost prevails. Once a sufficient root network is established-which may take 1-2 years, it is effectively self sufficient and can show very strong growth with up to 10-12 leaves a year (report from Portugal) and up to 1.5 meters of trunk and 5 meters in height in 6 years even when completely neglected in a dry spot in the wild (documented case in Southern California). Proven cases from Portugal indicate that extreme summer temperatures (up to 40C) are well tolerated with no growth slowdown, provided water access is sufficient. In winter, growth will stop at temperatures below 5-10C and space around palm should be mulched or covered to keep soil dry during low temperatures. Plants require a sunny position and some shelter from strong winds when young.

It is now an endangered species, threatened by habitat loss.

== Description ==
Parajubaea torallyi can be over 13 meters in height. It can withstand temperatures of -13 degrees Celsius (9 degrees Fahrenheit). The fruits, or cocos, grow 5–10 cm in diameter in clusters weighing up to 15 kg.
