= Attalea septuagenata =

Conservation status
- Least Concern (IUCN 3.1)

Scientific classification
- Kingdom: Plantae
- Clade: Embryophytes
- Clade: Tracheophytes
- Clade: Spermatophytes
- Clade: Angiosperms
- Clade: Monocots
- Clade: Commelinids
- Order: Arecales
- Family: Arecaceae
- Genus: Attalea
- Species: A. septuagenata

Binomial name
- Attalea septuagenata Dugand

Species of palm

Attalea septuagenata is a species of flowering plant in the family Arecaceae. It is A tree found only in Amazonas Department of southeastern Colombia.
