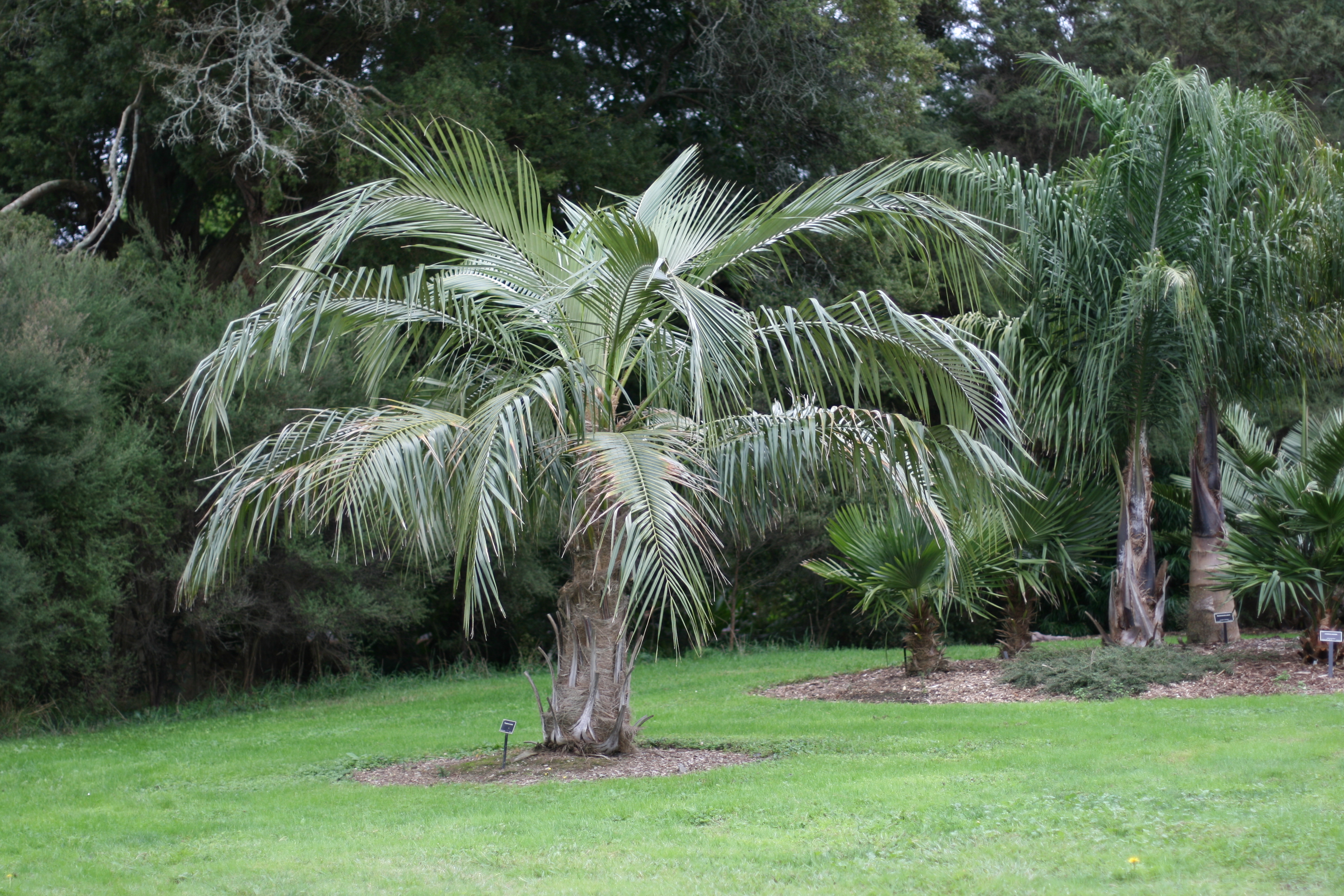

Scientific classification
- Kingdom: Plantae
- Clade: Tracheophytes
- Clade: Angiosperms
- Clade: Monocots
- Clade: Commelinids
- Order: Arecales
- Family: Arecaceae
- Genus: Parajubaea
- Species: P. cocoides

Binomial name
- Parajubaea cocoides Burret

= Parajubaea cocoides =

Species of palm

Parajubaea cocoides, the mountain coconut, coco Cumbe or Quito palm, is a species of flowering plant in the family Arecaceae. It occurs in Ecuador, Colombia and Peru.

== Description ==
Palms up to 16 m tall, trunk up to 45 cm in diameter. Leaves 3–4 m long, dark green above, grayish green beneath, with 60-70 pairs of segments or pinnae, the longest pinnae in the middle up to 70 cm long. Inflorescence 1–2 m long, with 50-70 short branches. Fruit ellipsoid, 4-5.5 cm long, 2.8–4 cm in diameter, greenish brown.

== Distribution and habitat ==
Known only from cultivation in the Andean valleys of southern Colombia and Ecuador at elevations of 2000–3000 m. However, an alleged natural population was reported in a town in northern Peru at 1900 m.

== Uses ==
Parajubaea cocoides is cultivated as an ornamental palm for parks and avenues. Outside its area of origin, it is found in cultivation in San Francisco, Sydney, Costa del Sol, New Zealand.The seeds are edible and taste like coconut.

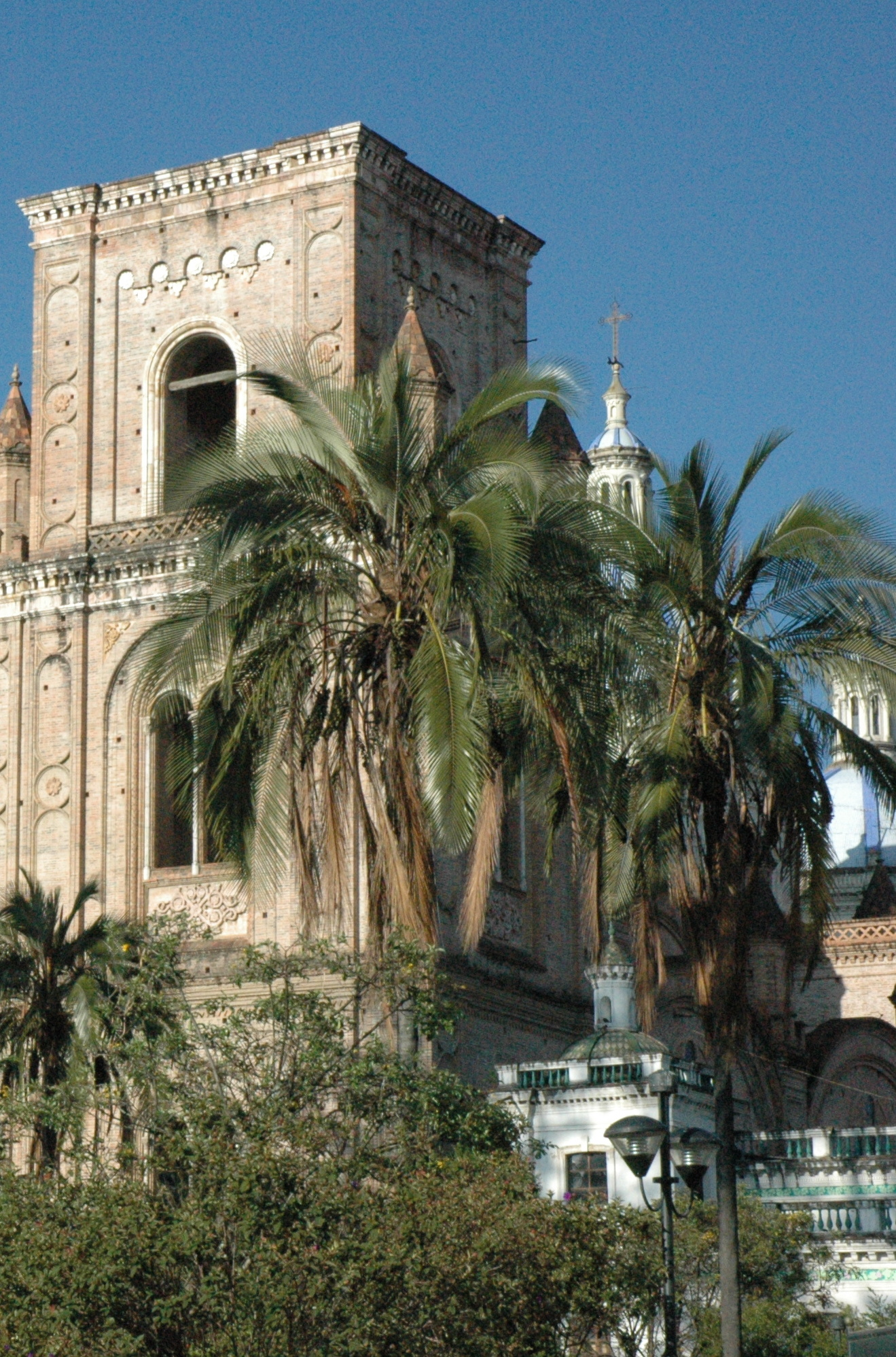
Parajubaea cocoides next to the cathedral, at Cuenca, Ecuador.
