= Asterogyne yaracuyense =

Conservation status
- Critically Endangered (IUCN 3.1)

Scientific classification
- Kingdom: Plantae
- Clade: Embryophytes
- Clade: Tracheophytes
- Clade: Angiosperms
- Clade: Monocots
- Clade: Commelinids
- Order: Arecales
- Family: Arecaceae
- Genus: Asterogyne
- Species: A. yaracuyense

Binomial name
- Asterogyne yaracuyense A.J.Hend. & Steyerm.

Species of palm

Asterogyne yaracuyense is a species of flowering plant in the family Arecaceae. It is a palm endemic to Cerro La Chapa in northern Venezuela. It is threatened by habitat loss.
