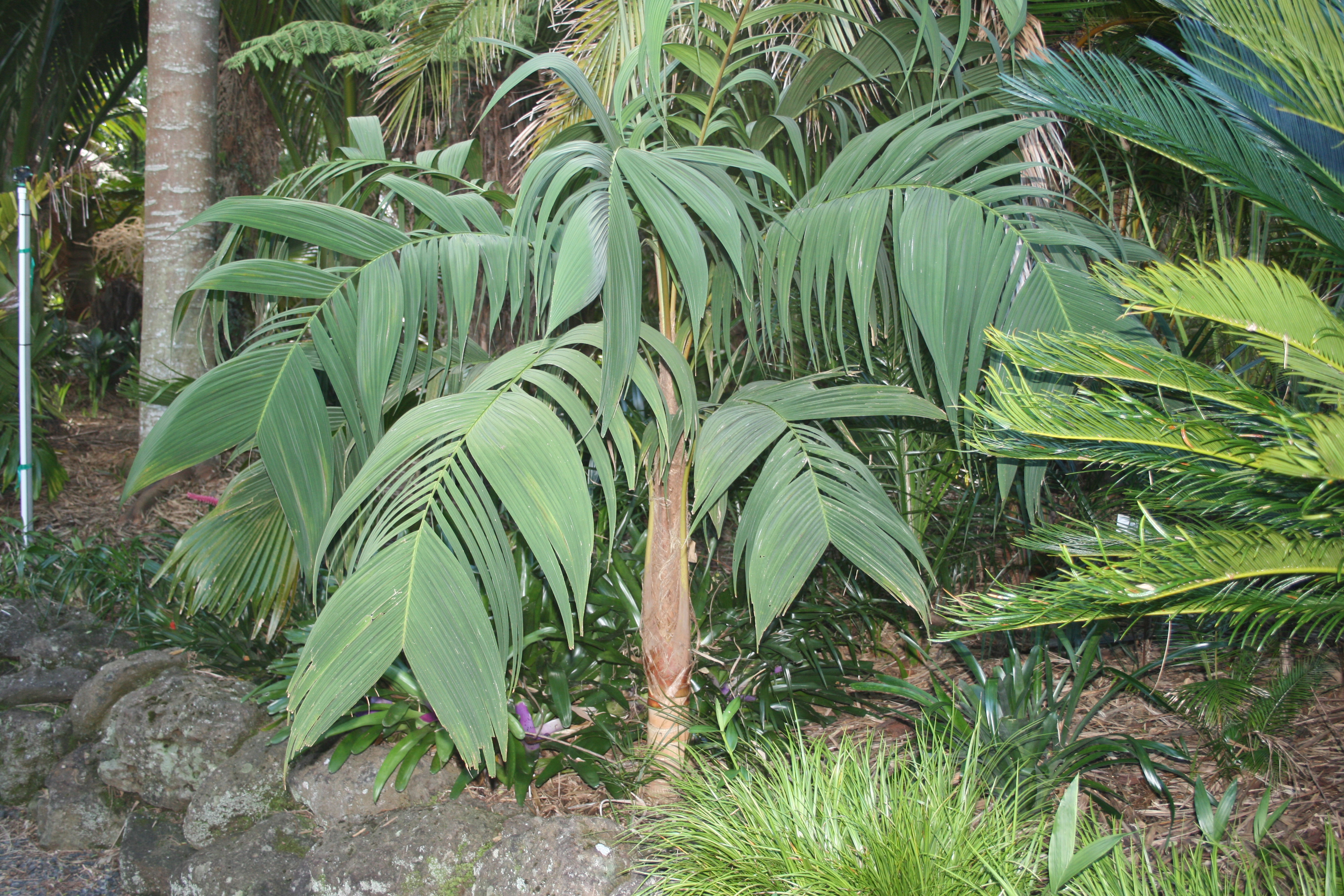

Conservation status
- Least Concern (IUCN 3.1)

Scientific classification
- Kingdom: Plantae
- Clade: Tracheophytes
- Clade: Angiosperms
- Clade: Monocots
- Clade: Commelinids
- Order: Arecales
- Family: Arecaceae
- Genus: Geonoma
- Species: G. undata

Binomial name
- Geonoma undata Klotzsch

= Geonoma undata =

Red crownshaft palm

Species of palm

Geonoma undata is a species of medium-sized palm tree native to North and South America. It grows in the understory of tropical forests at high altitudes. This species has highly variable traits depending on its geographic location and several subspecies exist as a result.

== Taxonomy ==
Geonoma undata is a neotropical species most closely related to G. lehmannii, G. orbignyana, G. talamancana, and G. trigona. In fact, G. undata is nearly indistinguishable from the species G. lehmannii and G. orbignyana. The epithet name undata comes from the Latin term for "wavy" or "wave-like".

== Description ==
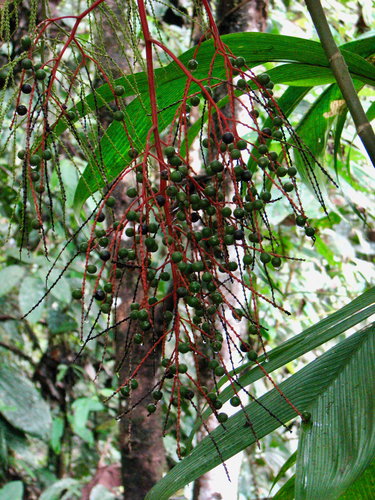
Geonoma undata fruiting inflorescence

This plant is a medium-sized, solitary palm that reaches a maximum height of 9–10 meters and has a trunk 10 cm wide in diameter at maturity. The leaves are approximately 2.5 m long and can be divided or undivided. If leaves are divided, they tend to be irregularly pinnate with the base of pinnate leaflets being diagonal to the stem rachis. The protective leaf sheath that surrounds leaf bases has a notable reddish tint.

One key feature that distinguishes this species from its relatives is the morphology of its prophylls. In palms, a prophyll refers to the first bract, or leaf-like structure, holding the inflorescence. Geonoma undata has a prophyll with unequally spaced ridges and a densely matted surface which is unique to the species. The prophyll margins typically have irregular spiny projections. Prophyll length is highly variable and can be up to 50 cm long.

This species has a highly branching inflorescence below the plant leaves. There can be second and third order branching. As seen in other species of the genus Geonoma, the flowers of G. undata are imperfect and very small. They are located in pits which are organized in a spiral arrangement on rachillae. Staminate and pistillate flowers occur in clusters of three with one pistillate flower, and two staminate flowers in each cluster. Staminate flowers fall off after maturity while the pistillate flowers remain on the plant. The staminate flowers have six stamen with short anthers curling at maturity. The perianth of both staminate and pistillate flowers is composed of three sepals and three petals. However, there is a difference between male and female flowers. In staminate flowers, the sepals are distinct, narrow and rounded at the apex. The petals are basally connate and the anthers have valvular dehiscence. Meanwhile, pistillate flowers exhibit basal connation in both sepals and petals. The pistil is composed of three carpels, an elongate style, and three stigmas. Neither pistillate nor staminate flowers emerge very far out from the pit in which they are located. The pistillate receptacle is anywhere between 12 and 47 cm long and has a reddish tone when the flower is developing fruit.

The fruit of G. undata is classified as a drupe, and a single inflorescence bears many drupes. The fruit size is 5 to 15 mm long and about 12 mm in diameter. The surface of the fruit is bumpy and black when ripe. It has an ovoid shape with a pointed apex.

== Distribution and habitat ==
Geonoma undata is native throughout Central and South America, ranging from the southern tropics of Mexico to Bolivia. It is prevalent in mountainous cloud forests at high elevations. As an understory species of palm, Geonoma undata can withstand low amounts of light and prefers a humid environment.

== Cultivation and use ==
Certain parts of Geonoma undata are edible, and this species is often cultivated for heart of palm in Central America. Other uses of G. undata include utilizing leaves for roof thatching and palm trunks for poles in primitive construction. The palm wood is also used by indigenous groups to make various tools and utensils. Traditionally, the fruits are useful in making a dark dye. It is occasionally used in landscaping and horticulture as well.

== Conservation ==
This plant species is listed as "Vulnerable" in Venezuela but it is assessed as least concern in other countries. One of the major threats to G. undata is habitat disturbance via deforestation and urbanization. Because this is a solitary species, it tends to naturally occur in small numbers making the effects of habitat disturbance acute to the overall population. Although G. undata is cultivated in Central America for its edible heart of palm, some harvest the palm illegally in protected areas which also threatens the native population.
