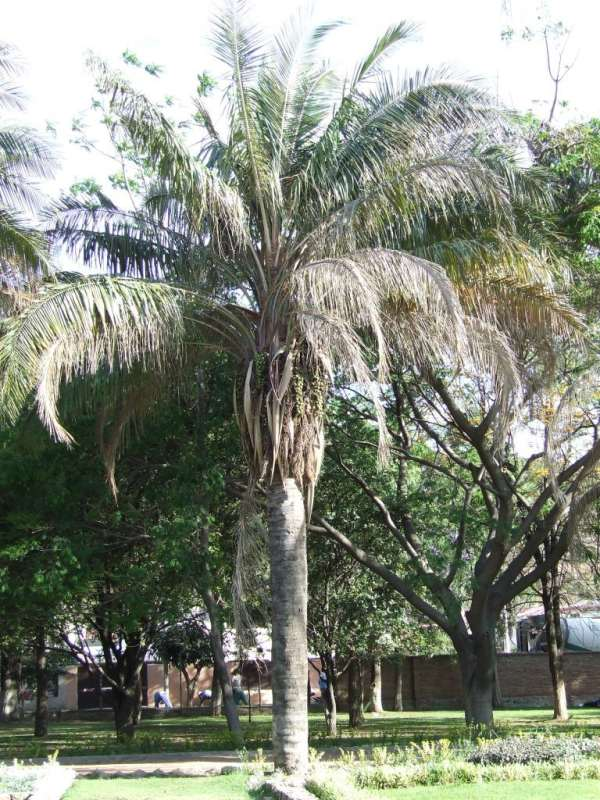
- Attalea princeps at Cochabamba, Bolivia.

Scientific classification
- Kingdom: Plantae
- Clade: Tracheophytes
- Clade: Angiosperms
- Clade: Monocots
- Clade: Commelinids
- Order: Arecales
- Family: Arecaceae
- Genus: Attalea
- Species: A. princeps

Binomial name
- Attalea princeps Mart.

Synonyms
- Scheelea princeps (Mart.) H.Karst.

= Attalea princeps =

Species of palm

Attalea princeps is a species of palm tree native to the Amazon rainforest of Bolivia.

It is the subject of an eponymous short story written by Russian author Vsevolod Garshin.
