= Svenning =

Svenning is a surname. Notable people with the surname include:

- Jens-Christian Svenning, Danish ecologist, biogeographer and academic
- Linus Svenning (born 1990), Swedish singer and songwriter
- Øyvind Svenning (born 1980), Norwegian footballer
