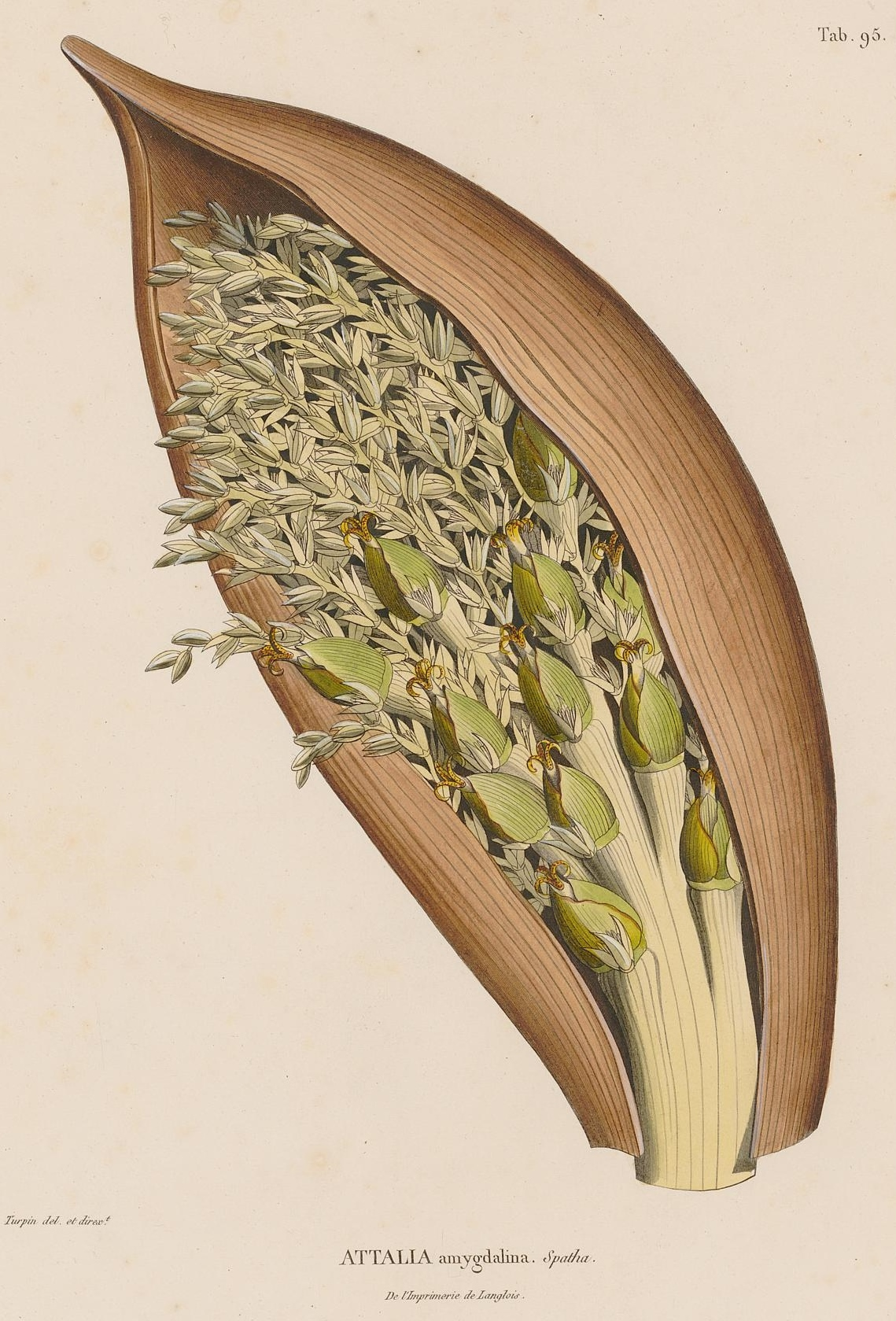
- Inflorescence.

Scientific classification
- Kingdom: Plantae
- Clade: Tracheophytes
- Clade: Angiosperms
- Clade: Monocots
- Clade: Commelinids
- Order: Arecales
- Family: Arecaceae
- Genus: Attalea
- Species: A. amygdalina

Binomial name
- Attalea amygdalina Kunth

Synonyms
- Attalea uberrima Dugand; Attalea victoriana Dugand

= Attalea amygdalina =

Species of palm

Attalea amygdalina is a species of palm endemic to Colombia.
