= Mystrops =

Scientific classification
- Domain: Eukaryota
- Kingdom: Animalia
- Phylum: Arthropoda
- Class: Insecta
- Order: Coleoptera
- Suborder: Polyphaga
- Infraorder: Cucujiformia
- Family: Nitidulidae
- Genus: Mystrops; Murray, 1864

Genus of beetles

Mystrops is a genus of beetles belonging to the family Nitidulidae.

The species of this genus are found in Southern America.

Species:

- Mystrops dufaui Grouvelle, 1912
- Mystrops insularis Grouvelle, 1898
