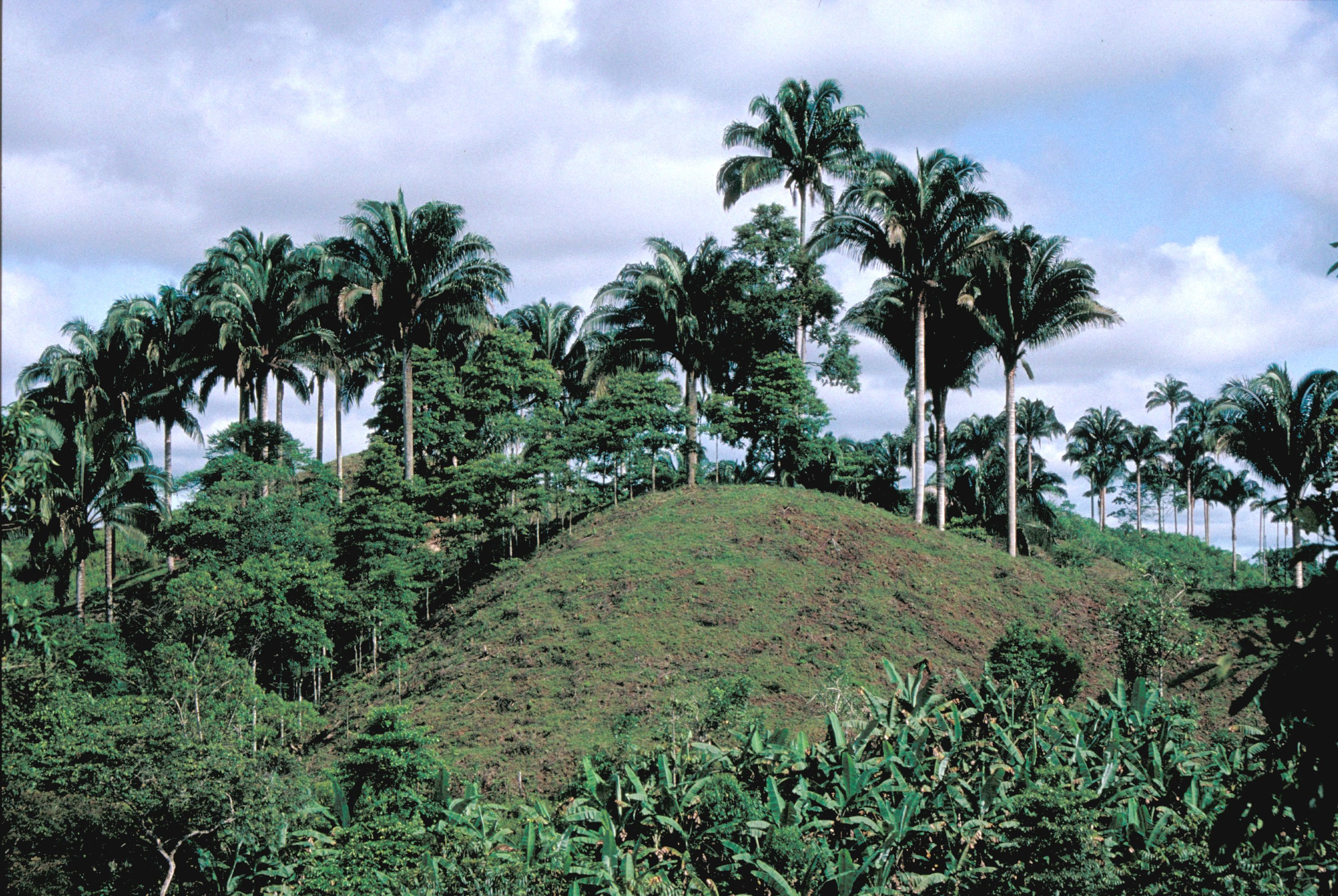

Scientific classification
- Kingdom: Plantae
- Clade: Tracheophytes
- Clade: Angiosperms
- Clade: Monocots
- Clade: Commelinids
- Order: Arecales
- Family: Arecaceae
- Genus: Attalea
- Species: A. colenda

Binomial name
- Attalea colenda (O.F.Cook) Balslev & A.J.Hend

Synonyms
- Ynesa colenda O.F.Cook

= Attalea colenda =

Species of palm

Attalea colenda is a species of palm tree native to Colombia and Ecuador.
