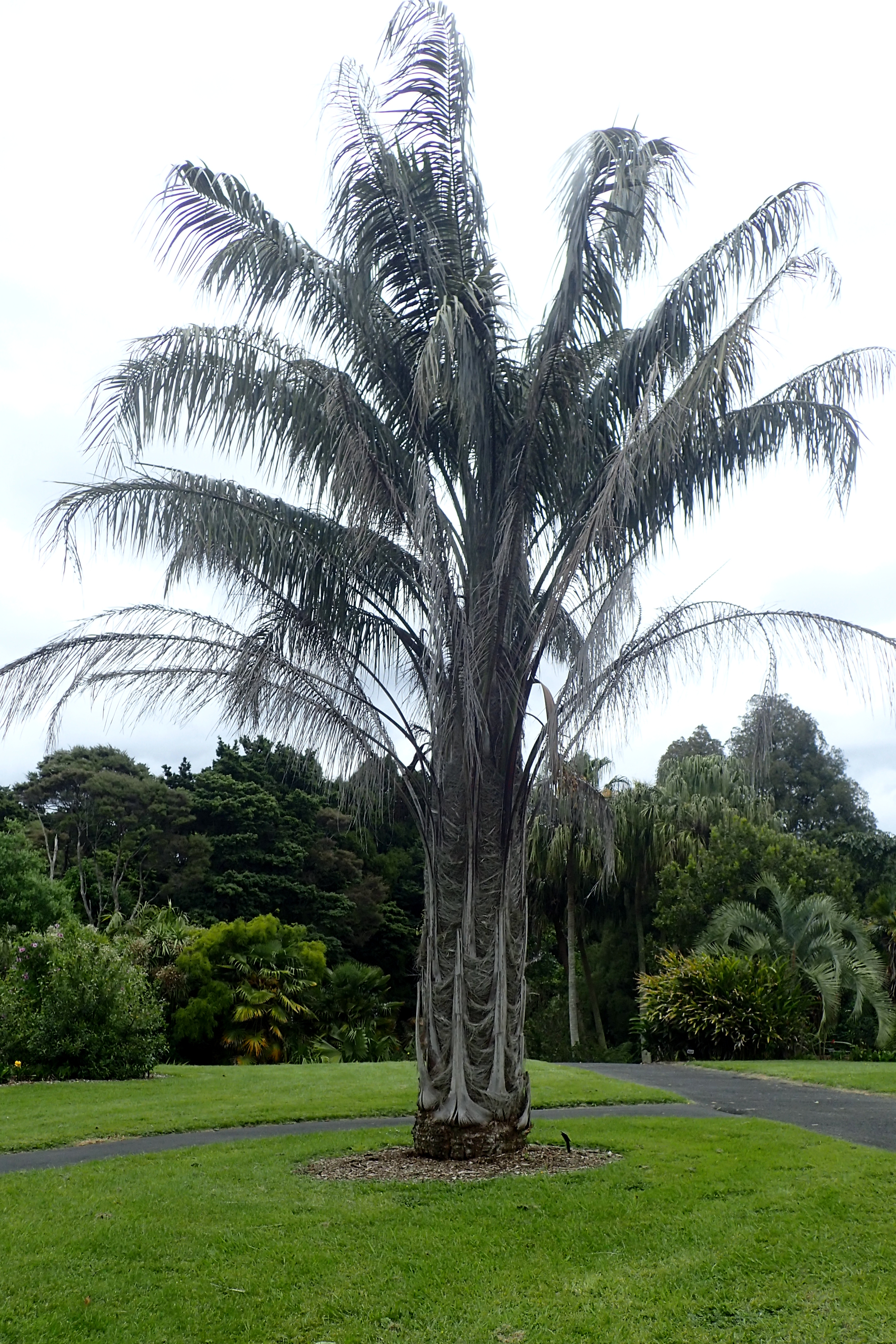
- Parajubaea torallyi

Scientific classification
- Kingdom: Plantae
- Clade: Tracheophytes
- Clade: Angiosperms
- Clade: Monocots
- Clade: Commelinids
- Order: Arecales
- Family: Arecaceae
- Subfamily: Arecoideae
- Tribe: Cocoseae
- Subtribe: Attaleinae
- Genus: Parajubaea; Burret

Type species
- Parajubaea cocoides Burret

= Parajubaea =

Genus of palms

Parajubaea is a genus of flowering plant in the family Arecaceae.

Species in this genus are native to the northern Andes mountains in northwestern South America.

Parajubaea is named after King Juba II.

== Species ==
The genus Parajubaea contains the following species:

Image	Scientific name	Common name	Distribution
	Parajubaea cocoides Burret	mountain coconut, coco cumbe or Quito palm	Colombia, Ecuador, Peru
	Parajubaea sunkha M.Moraes	Sunkha palm and palma de Zunkha	Bolivia
	Parajubaea torallyi (Mart.) Burret	palma de Pasobaya or Bolivian mountain coconut	Bolivia
