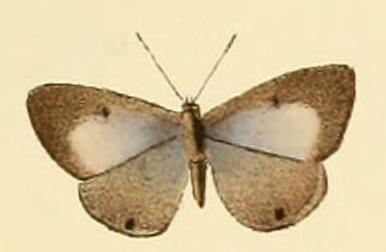

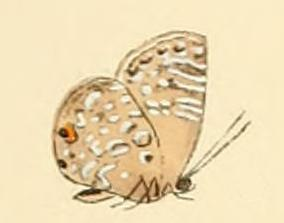

Conservation status
- Least Concern (IUCN 3.1)

Scientific classification
- Kingdom: Animalia
- Phylum: Arthropoda
- Clade: Pancrustacea
- Class: Insecta
- Order: Lepidoptera
- Family: Lycaenidae
- Genus: Anthene
- Species: A. princeps

Binomial name
- Anthene princeps (Butler, 1876)

Synonyms
- Lycaenesthes princeps Butler, 1876; Lycaenesthes neglecta Trimen, 1891; Lycaenesthes uganda Bethune-Baker, 1910; Lycaena smithii Mabille, 1877; Lycaena lochias Hewitson, 1878; Lycaenesthes mabillei Lathy, 1921

= Anthene princeps =

Cupreous hairtail

Species of butterfly

Anthene princeps, the cupreous hairtail, is a butterfly of the family Lycaenidae. It is found in Africa.

The wingspan is about 22–27 mm in males and 24–29 mm in females.

The larvae feed on Albizia gummifera.

== Subspecies ==
- Anthene princeps princeps (Senegal, Burkina Faso, Guinea, Sierra Leone, Liberia, Ivory Coast, Ghana, Benin, Nigeria, Niger, Cameroon, Ethiopia, Kenya, Zambia, northern Zimbabwe, north-western Botswana, Eswatini, South Africa: Limpopo Province, Mpumalanga, Free State Province and KwaZulu-Natal)
- Anthene princeps smithii (Mabille, 1877) (Madagascar)

Torben Larsen developed a species numbering system for his 2005 publication Butterflies of West Africa. The nominate subspecies is #514. The 'Larsen' numbers have since been used with permission in A Sharp Eye on Butterflies of Ghana.
