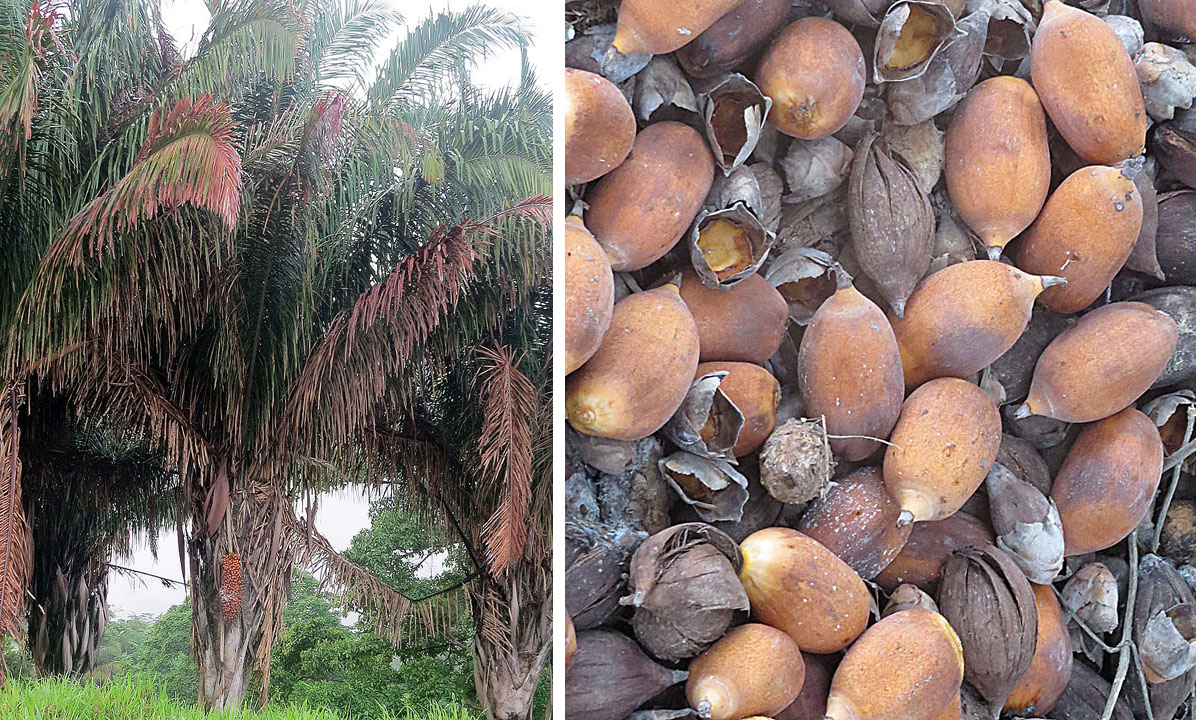

Scientific classification
- Kingdom: Plantae
- Clade: Tracheophytes
- Clade: Angiosperms
- Clade: Monocots
- Clade: Commelinids
- Order: Arecales
- Family: Arecaceae
- Genus: Attalea
- Species: A. butyracea

Binomial name
- Attalea butyracea (Mutis ex L. f.) Wess. Boer

Synonyms
- Attalea gomphococca Mart.; Attalea humboldtiana Spruce; Attalea macrocarpa (H.Karst.) Wess.Boer; Attalea pycnocarpa Wess.Boer; Attalea wallisii Huber; Cocos butyracea Mutis ex L.f.; Scheelea butyracea (Mutis ex L.f.) H.Karst. ex H.Wendl.; Scheelea dryanderae Burret; Scheelea excelsa H.Karst.; Scheelea gomphococca (Mart.) Burret; Scheelea humboldtiana (Spruce) Burret; Scheelea macrocarpa H.Karst.; Scheelea passargei Burret; Scheelea regia H.Karst.; Scheelea wallisii (Huber) Burret

= Attalea butyracea =

Species of plant

Attalea butyracea is a species of palm tree native from Mexico to northern South America.

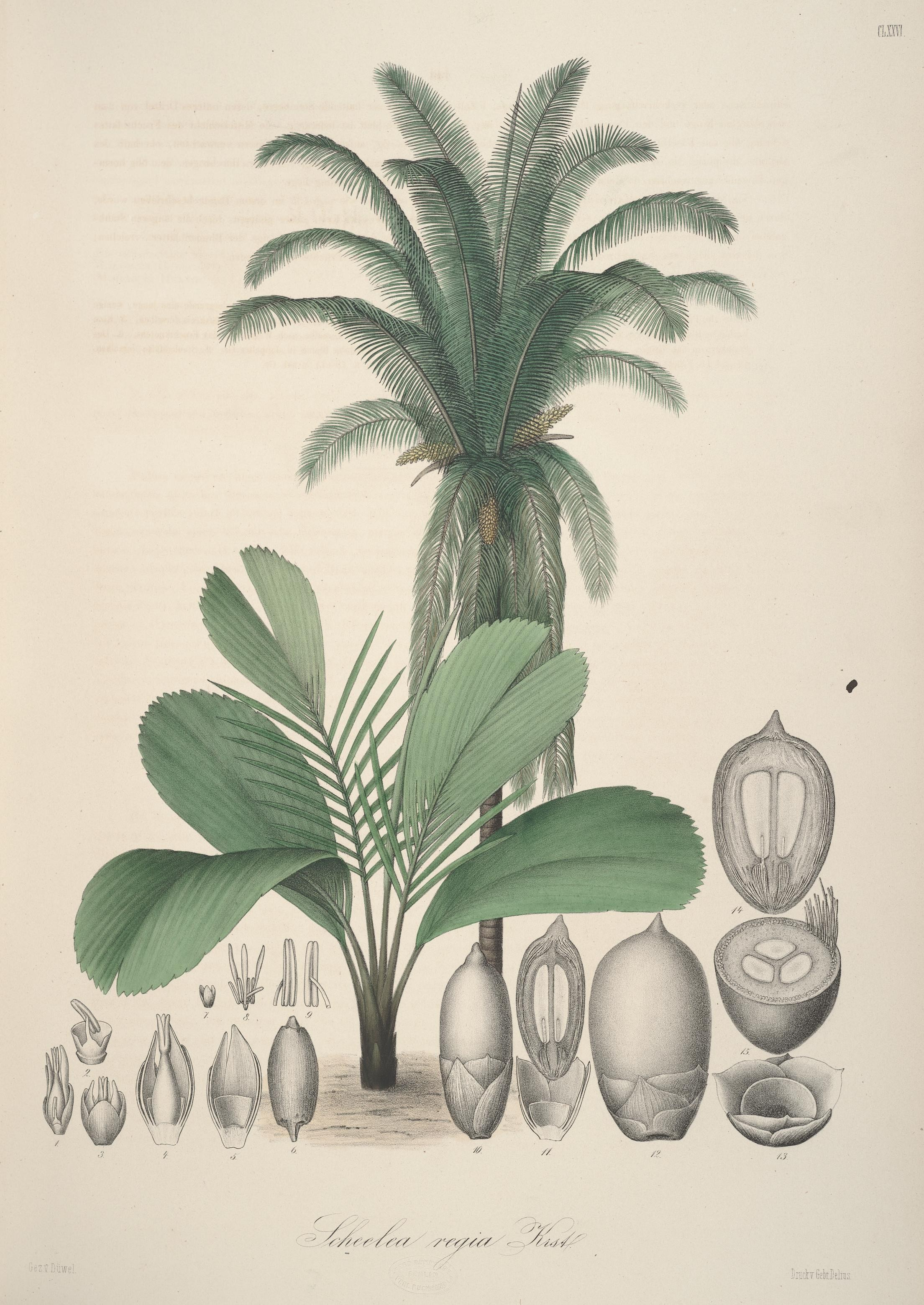
Pl. CLXXVI Florae Columbiae.
