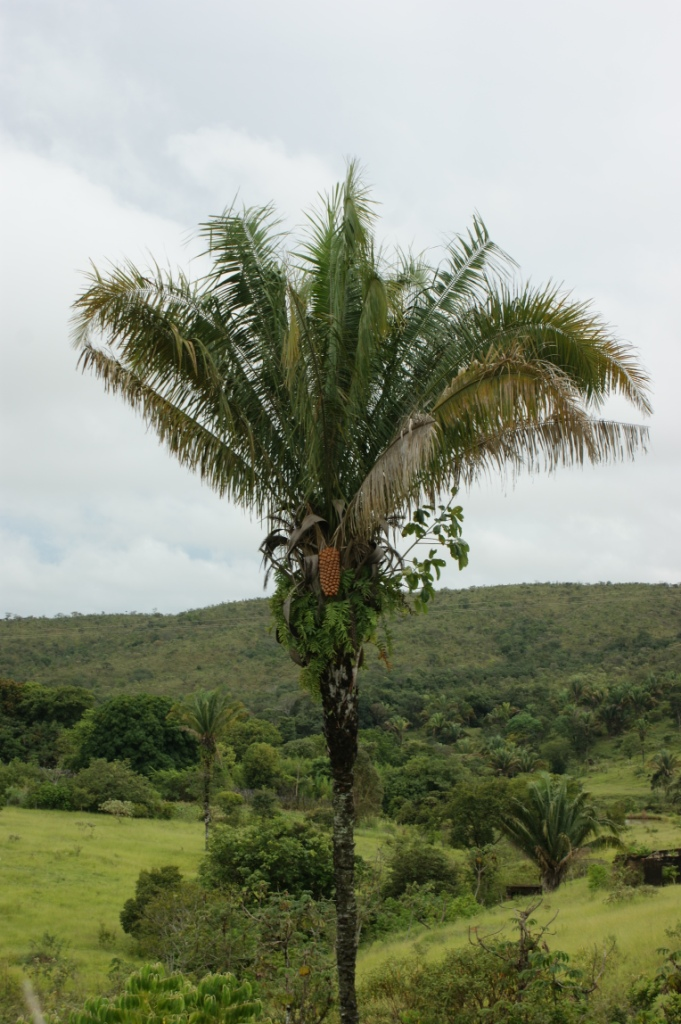
- Attalea brasiliensis

Scientific classification
- Kingdom: Plantae
- Clade: Tracheophytes
- Clade: Angiosperms
- Clade: Monocots
- Clade: Commelinids
- Order: Arecales
- Family: Arecaceae
- Subfamily: Arecoideae
- Tribe: Cocoseae
- Subtribe: Attaleinae
- Genus: Attalea; Kunth

Type species
- Attalea amygdalina Kunth

Diversity
- Between 29 and 67 species

Synonyms
- Maximiliana Mart.; Orbignya Mart. ex Endl.; Lithocarpos O.Targ.Tozz. ex Steud.; Scheelea H.Karst.; Englerophoenix Kuntze; Pindarea Barb.Rodr.; Bornoa O.F.Cook; Heptantra O.F.Cook; Temenia O.F.Cook; Ethnora O.F.Cook; Parascheelea Dugand; Sarinia O.F.Cook; Ynesa O.F.Cook; Markleya Bondar; × Attabignya Balick, A.B.Anderson & Med.-Costa; × Maximbignya Glassman

= Attalea (plant) =

Genus of palms

Attalea is a large genus of palms native to Mexico, the Caribbean, Central and South America. This pinnately-leaved, non-spiny genus includes both small palms without an aboveground stem and large trees. The genus has a complicated taxonomic history and has often been divided into four or five genera based on differences in male flowers. Since the genera can only be distinguished on the basis of their male flowers, the existence of intermediate flower types and the existence of hybrids between different genera has been used as an argument for keeping them all in the same genus. This has been supported by recent molecular phylogenies.

Between 29 and 67 species are recognised in the genus, with estimates of as many as 100. Incomplete herbarium collections make it difficult to determine whether certain groups represent single species, or groups of similar species. Attalea species have a long history of human use, and include economically important sources of palm oil and fibre. Many species are fire tolerant and thrive in disturbed habitats. Their seeds are animal dispersed, including some which are thought to have been adapted for dispersal by now-extinct Pleistocene megafauna.

== Description ==
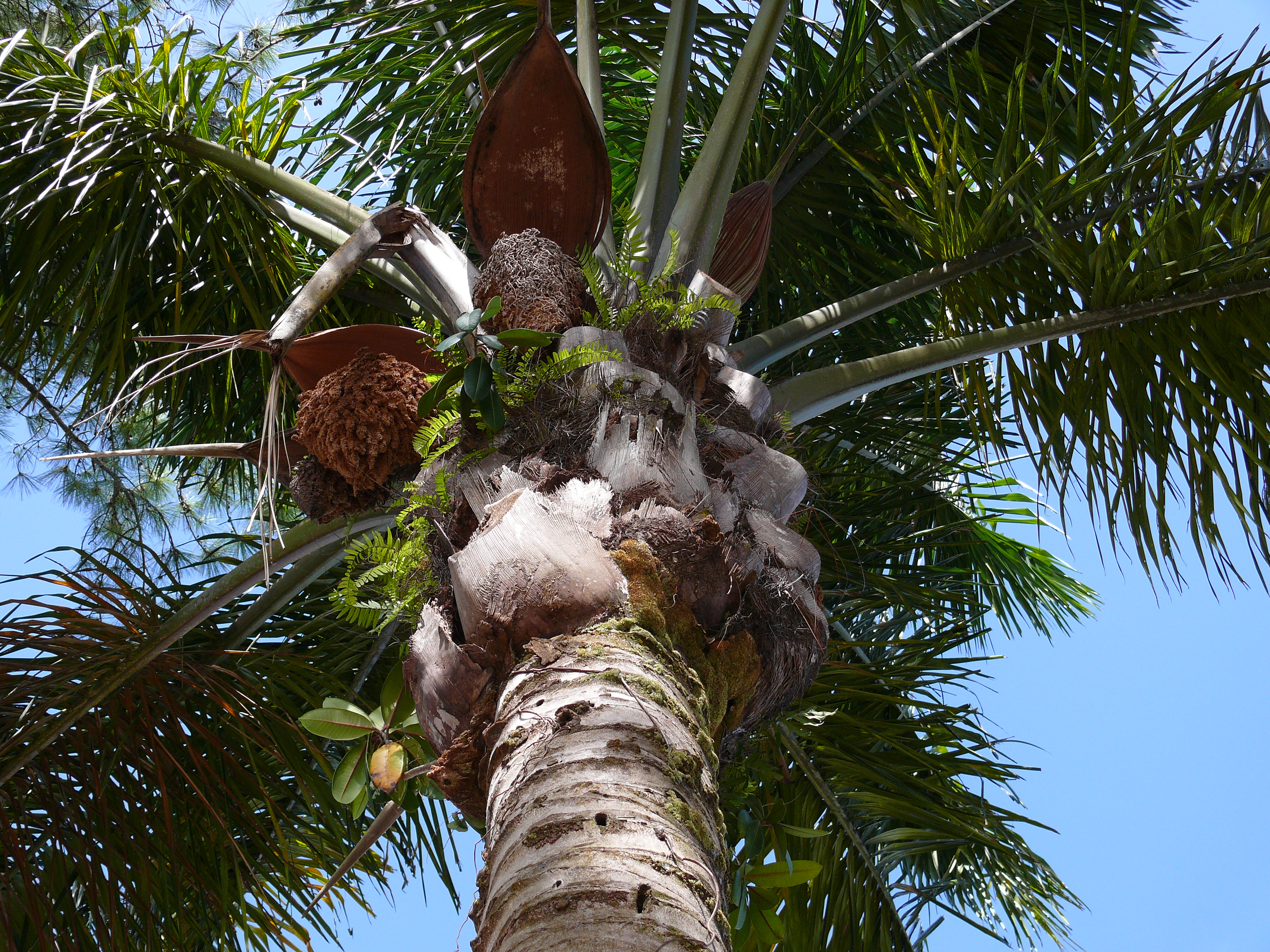
Detail of the crown of Attalea maripa showing leaf arrangement and inflorescences

Attalea is a genus of non-spiny palms with pinnately compound leaves—rows of leaflets emerge on either side of the axis of the leaf in a feather-like or fern-like pattern. Species range from large trees with stout stems up to 30 metres (98 ft) tall to acaulescent palms (ones which lack an aboveground stem). The number of leaves per individual varies from about three to thirty-five; larger plants tend to have more and longer leaves.

Inflorescences are large, branched and borne among the leaves. The inflorescence consists of a main axis—the peduncle and the rachis—and a series of smaller branches, the rachillae. The rachillae, which bear the flowers, emerge from the rachis. The peduncle is the main stalk, connecting the rachis with the stem. Inflorescences either consist entirely of male flowers, or are predominantly female with a few male flowers. Fruit usually have two or three seeds, although fewer or more are present in some species, and are usually brown, yellow, orange-brown or purple when mature.

Four different types of male flowers exist. On the basis of these flower types, the genus has often been split into four genera—a more narrowly defined Attalea, Orbignya, Maximiliana, and Scheelea. The species sometimes referred to Orbignya have coiled anthers, while the other groups have straight ones. The petals of those placed in Maximiliana are much shorter than the stamens, while those placed in Scheelea and a more narrowly defined Attalea have petals that are longer than the stamens. Five species do not fit easily into any of these groups; this fact has been used as an argument in favour of considering this group a single genus.

== Taxonomy ==
- - Beccariophoenix
  - - Voanioala
    - Jubaeopsis
- - - Cocos nucifera
    - - Syagrus
      - Lytocaryum (nested within Syagrus)
  - - - - - Allagoptera
          - Polyandrococos
        - Parajubaea
      - - Butia
        - Jubaea
    - Attalea

Simplified phylogeny of members of the subtribe Attaleinae, based on seven WRKY gene loci.

Attalea has been placed in the subfamily Arecoideae, the tribe Cocoseae and the subtribe Attaleinae, together with the genera Allagoptera, Beccariophoenix, Butia, Cocos, Jubaea, Jubaeopsis, Parajubaea, Syagrus, and Voanioala. Within this subtribe, Attalea has been found to be a monophyletic group, and sister to the clade containing Allagoptera, Polyandrococos, Parajubaea, Butia, and Jubaea.

Disagreement exists as to whether Attalea should be considered a single genus, or a group of related genera. In their 1996 Field Guide to the Palms of the Americas, Andrew Henderson, Gloria Galeano, and Rodrigo Bernal combined all the species in the subtribe Attaleinae (as it was then defined) into a single genus, Attalea. In his 1999 Taxonomic Treatment of Palm Subtribe Attaleinae, American botanist Sidney F. Glassman divided the group into five genera—a more narrowly defined Attalea, Orbignya, Maximiliana, Scheelea and Ynesa, although he thought it likely that Ynesa colenda, the only member of that genus, was actually a hybrid. Rafäel Govaerts and John Dransfield recognised a single genus in their 2005 World Checklist of Palms, and Jean-Christophe Pintaud continued this usage in his 2008 review of the genus.

The multigenus approach is based solely on the structure of the male flowers; no other characters could be consistently associated with one genus or another. Four of the genera—Attalea (in a narrow sense), Orbignya, Maximiliana and Scheelea—correspond to four different types of male flowers found within the genus. However, a few species have flowers that are intermediate between these four types, including A. colenda (which Glassman placed in its own genus, Ynesa) and this has been used as an argument for the single-genus approach. The fact that there are several hybrids between species that would be considered different genera under Glassman's five-genus system was also used as an argument for placing them in a single genus. Molecular phylogenetic work by Alan Meerow and colleagues concluded that multi-genus approach did not produce monophyletic groups, but treating Attalea as a single genus did.

Cintia Freitas and colleagues identified three main clades within the genus based on the nuclear WRKY gene family. The first of these, a group of species from the coastal Atlantic Forest region in Brazil all of which had been placed in Attalea in the narrow sense, was termed the Attalea-like clade. This group was a sister to the other two clades. The second group, which they called the Scheelea-like clade, consisted of most of the species formerly placed in Scheelea, together with several that had been placed in Attalea (narrowly defined) and Orbigyna. The third group consisted mainly of species formerly placed in Orbigyna and Maximiliana; they called this the Orbigyna-like clade. Despite the existence of three well-supported clades, Freitas and colleagues concluded that the concept of Attalea as a single genus was best supported by their evidence.

=== History ===
The genus Attalea was first described Carl Sigismund Kunth in 1816 based on specimens collected by Alexander von Humboldt and Aimé Bonpland, although older, pre-Linnaean descriptions exist, including Charles Plumier's 1703 description of A. crassispatha. The genus was named for Attalus III Philometor, king of Pergamon, known for his interest in medicinal plants. The type species is A. amygdalina, a Colombian endemic. The genera Maximiliana and Orbignya were described by Carl Friedrich Philipp von Martius in 1826 and 1837 respectively. Scheelea was described by Hermann Karsten in 1857, and Ynesa by Orator F. Cook in 1942.

=== Species ===
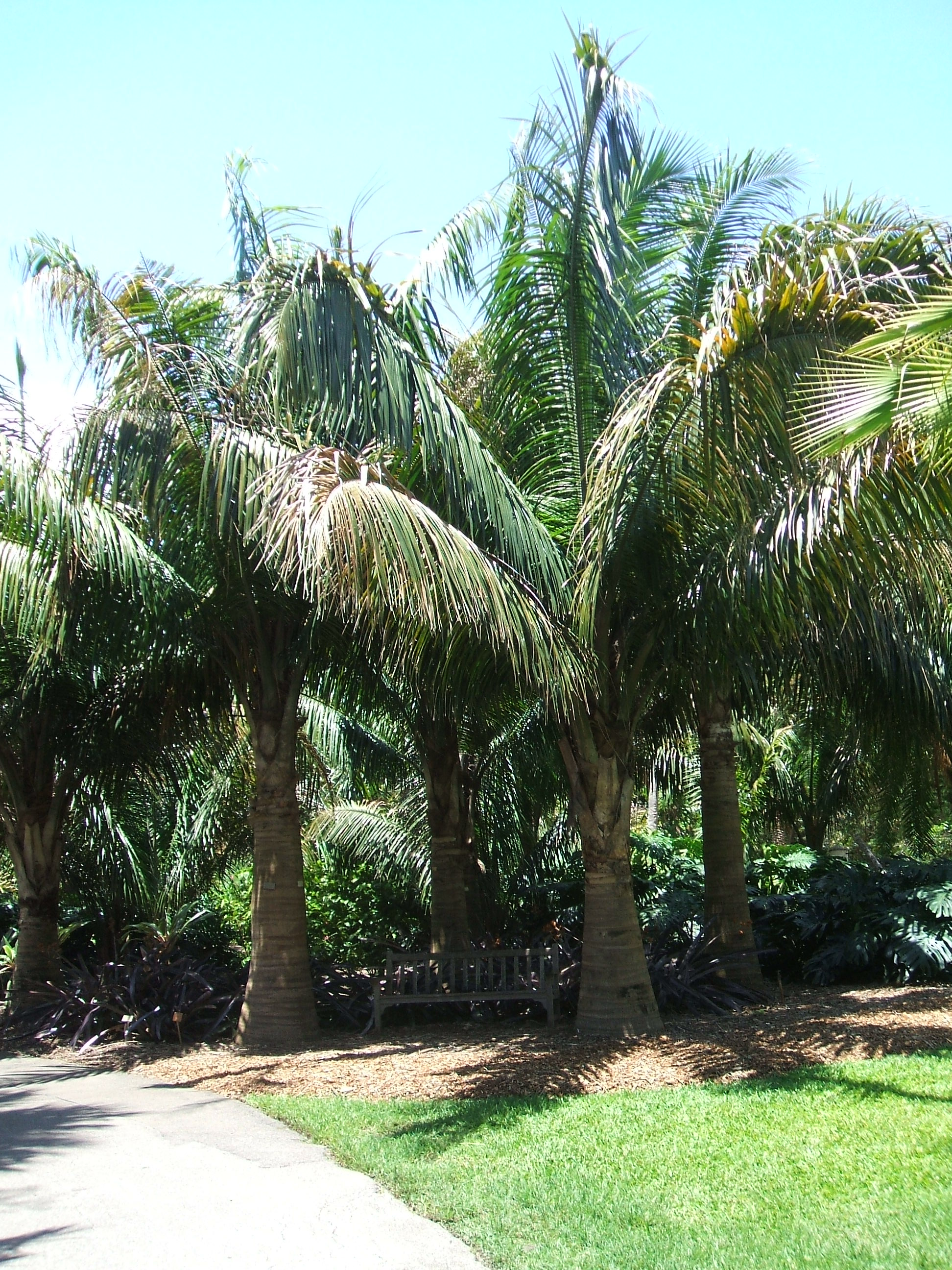
Attalea crassispatha, a Haitian endemic, is the most geographically isolated species in the genus.

Experts disagree about the number of species in Attalea. In 1965, Dutch taxonomist Jan Gerard Wessels Boer estimated that as many as 100 species may be in the genus. In their 1996 Field Guide to the Palms of the Americas Andrew Henderson and coauthors recognised 29 species in the genus, while Sidney Glassman recognised 65 species in his 1999 treatment of the group. Largely following Glassman's lead, Rafaël Govaerts and John Dransfield recognised 67 species in their 2005 World Checklist of Palms. An important element of this disagreement is the decision by Glassman to define species more narrowly than Henderson. As a result, what Henderson interpreted as variation within species, Glassman took as differences between morphologically similar species. This problem is complicated by the fact that many of these species are poorly represented in herbarium collections. The large size of the leaves, inflorescences and fruit of many Attalea species makes them difficult to collect. In addition, many important collections, including type specimens, have been lost or destroyed. Sparse or incomplete collections make it difficult to differentiate variation within a single species from variation between different species. Taxonomic uncertainty is exacerbated by frequent hybridisation between species.

== Reproduction and growth ==
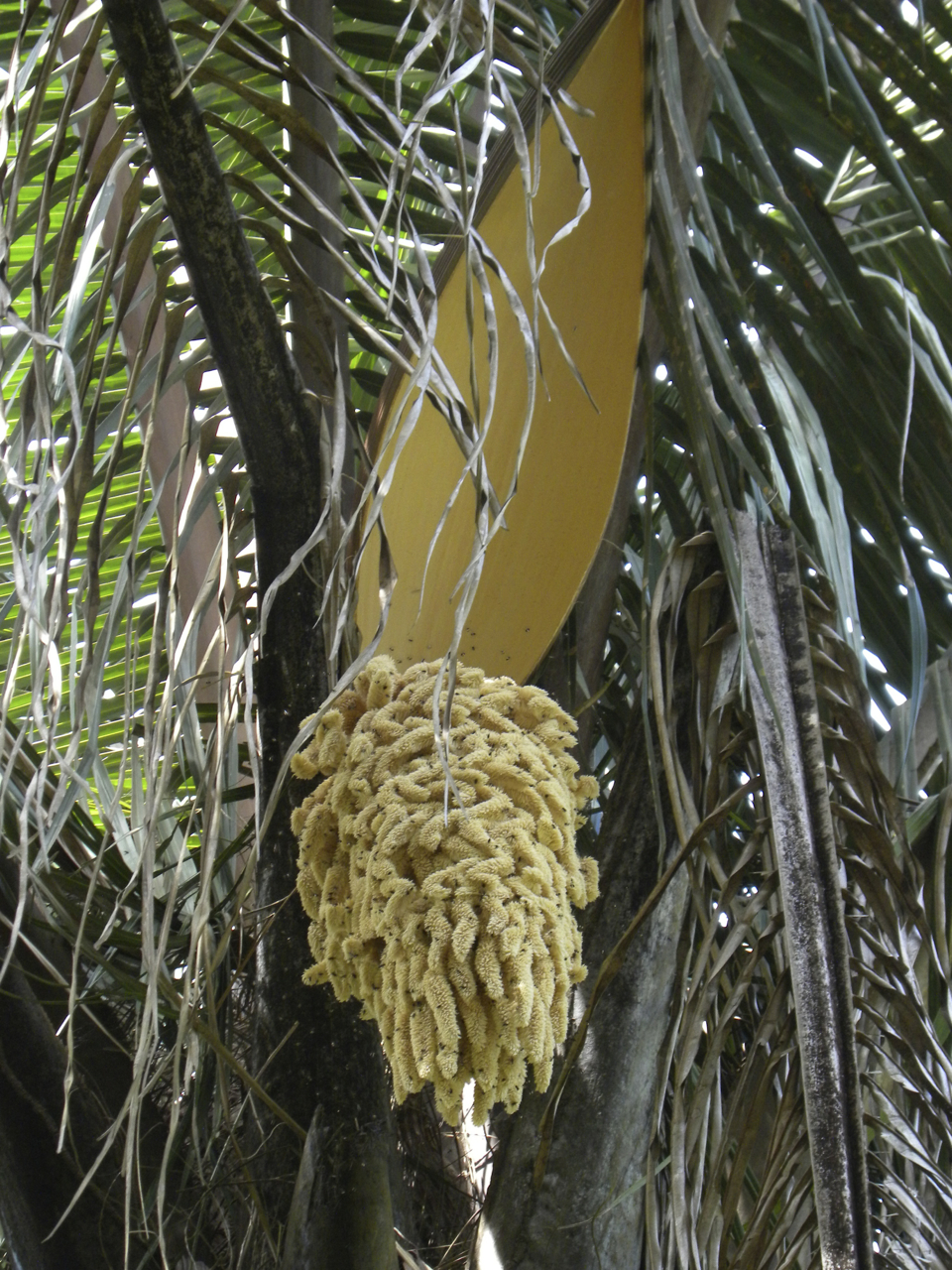
Male inflorescence of Attalea sp. swarming with insects.

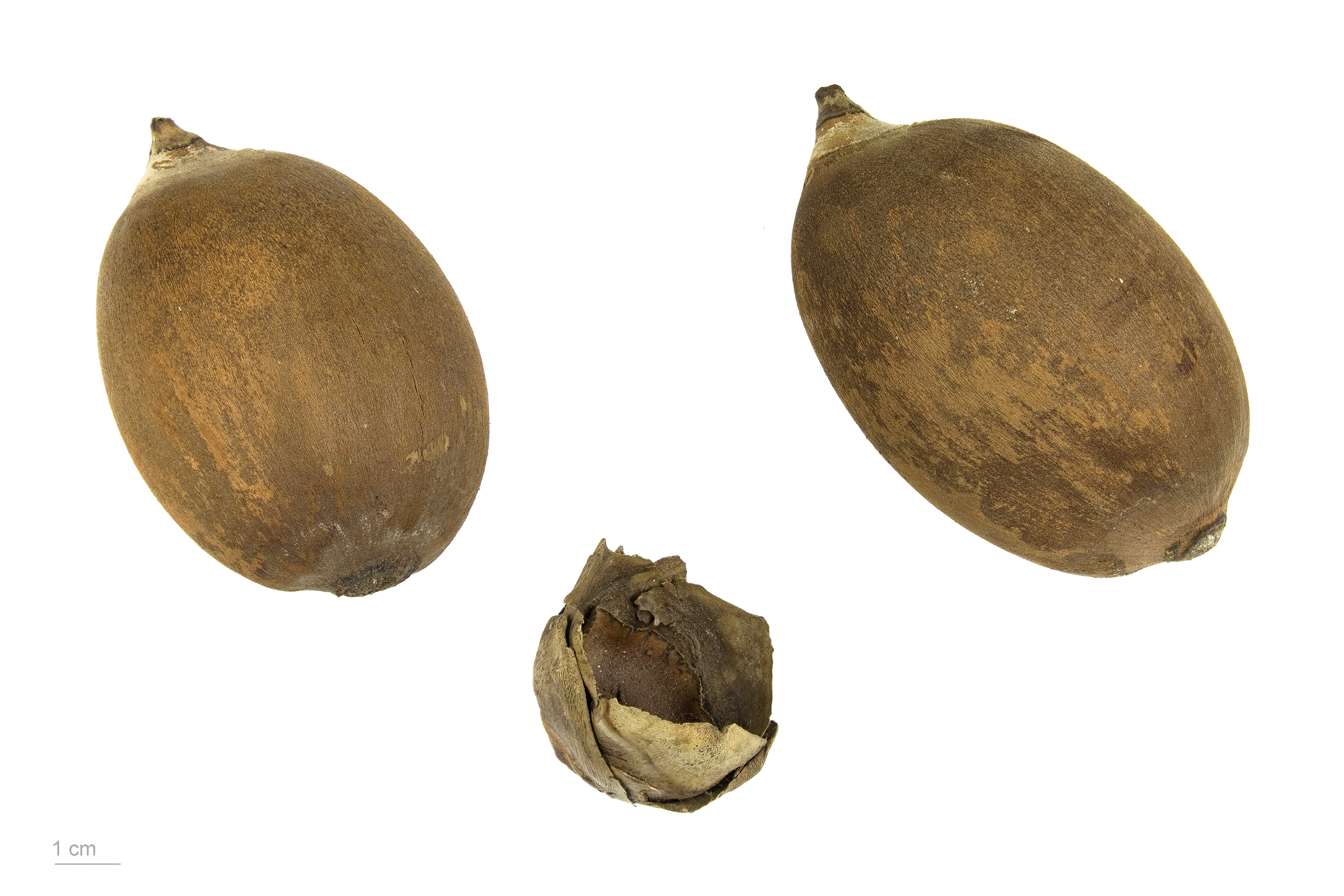
Attalea sp. – MHNT

Attalea species are monoecious—male and female flowers are separate, but are borne by the same plant. Various species have been described as being insect-pollinated, including A. phalerata, while pollination in A. colenda and A. speciosa, has been attributed both to insects and wind. The fruit are animal-dispersed.

Seed germination is remote tubular—during germination, as the cotyledon expands it pushes the young shoot away from the seed. After germination, the stem initially grows downward before turning to grow upward and produce the aboveground stem. This produces a "saxophone shaped" belowground portion of the stem. The fact that the shoot tips of Attalea seedlings are underground is likely to contribute to their fire-tolerance.

== Distribution ==
Species range across the Neotropics from Mexico in the north to Bolivia, Paraguay, and southern Brazil in the south, from low elevations in coastal Brazil to up to 1,600 m (5,200 ft) above sea level in the Andes. According to Govaerts and coauthors, three species are found in Mexico, four in Central America, and 62 in South America. Three species are present in the Caribbean—two in Trinidad and Tobago, along the southern edge of the region, and one in Haiti.

== Habitat and ecology ==
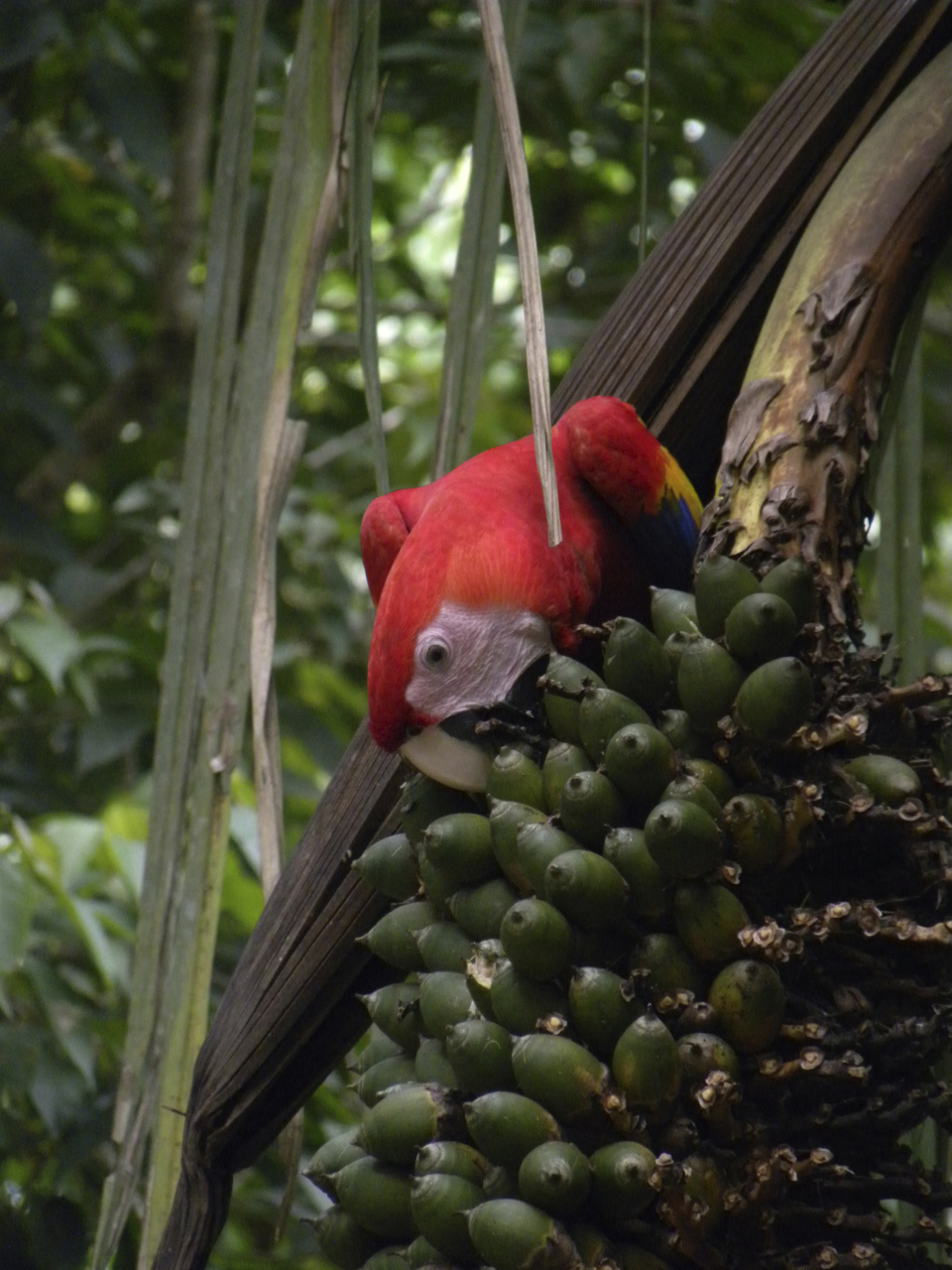
Scarlet macaw feeding on Attalea fruit.

Attalea includes both large trees and small, acaulescent palms, which occupy a number of different ecological niches. Dense stands of some of the larger species are conspicuous elements on the landscape, while smaller species are found in both in the forest understorey and in savannas.

Disturbance has been implicated in the formation of vegetation dominated by large Attalea species. In seasonally dry Amazonian forests, the density of large adult A. maripa palms was correlated with canopy openness; the species also dominates savannas formed by repeated forest fires in Trinidad and Tobago. A. speciosa forms pure stands in many parts of Brazil where natural forest vegetation has been cleared. Similarly, stands of A. funifera in Bahia, Brazil (which are cultivated for piassava fibre) are managed using fire—the seedlings survive cutting and burning, and are able to dominate burned forest patches.

The fruit are dispersed by animals; fruit which are not dispersed frequently suffer seed predation by bruchid beetles. Certain species of Attalea have been mentioned as examples of anachronistic species which are adapted for dispersal by now-extinct Pleistocene megafauna. On Maracá Island, Roraima, in the Brazilian Amazon, A. maripa fruit were consumed by tapirs, collared peccaries, deer, and primates. Rodents, including agoutis, fed upon the fruit, and as the fruit availability declined, they fed on the seeds. Other dispersers of Attalea fruit include crested caracaras, which consume the fruit and disperse the seeds of A. phalerata in the Brazilian Pantanal.

== Uses ==
Attalea species have a long history of human use. Carbonised Attalea maripa seeds have been found in archaeological sites in Colombia dating back to 9000 BP. Several species remain important sources of edible oil, thatch, edible seeds, and fibre. The leaves of Attalea butyracea and A. maripa are used extensively for thatching. Several species are oil palms, with A. speciosa among the most important economically. Products extracted from A. speciosa were reported to support over 300,000 households in the Brazilian state of Maranhão in 2005, and in 1985 it was estimated to support over 450,000 households throughout the Brazil. Piassava fibres, extracted from the leaf bases of A. funifera, are commercially important, and generated about US$20 million in annual income to Brazilian farmers in 1996.
