= Jan Gerard Wessels Boer =

Dutch botanist (1936–2019)

Jan Gerard Wessels Boer (born 10 August 1936, Haren, Groningen- died Molenaarsgraaf 13 July 2019) was a Dutch plant taxonomist best known for his work on palms. He has described 37 species, subspecies and varieties of plants, especially in the palm family.
