= List of palms native to the Caribbean =

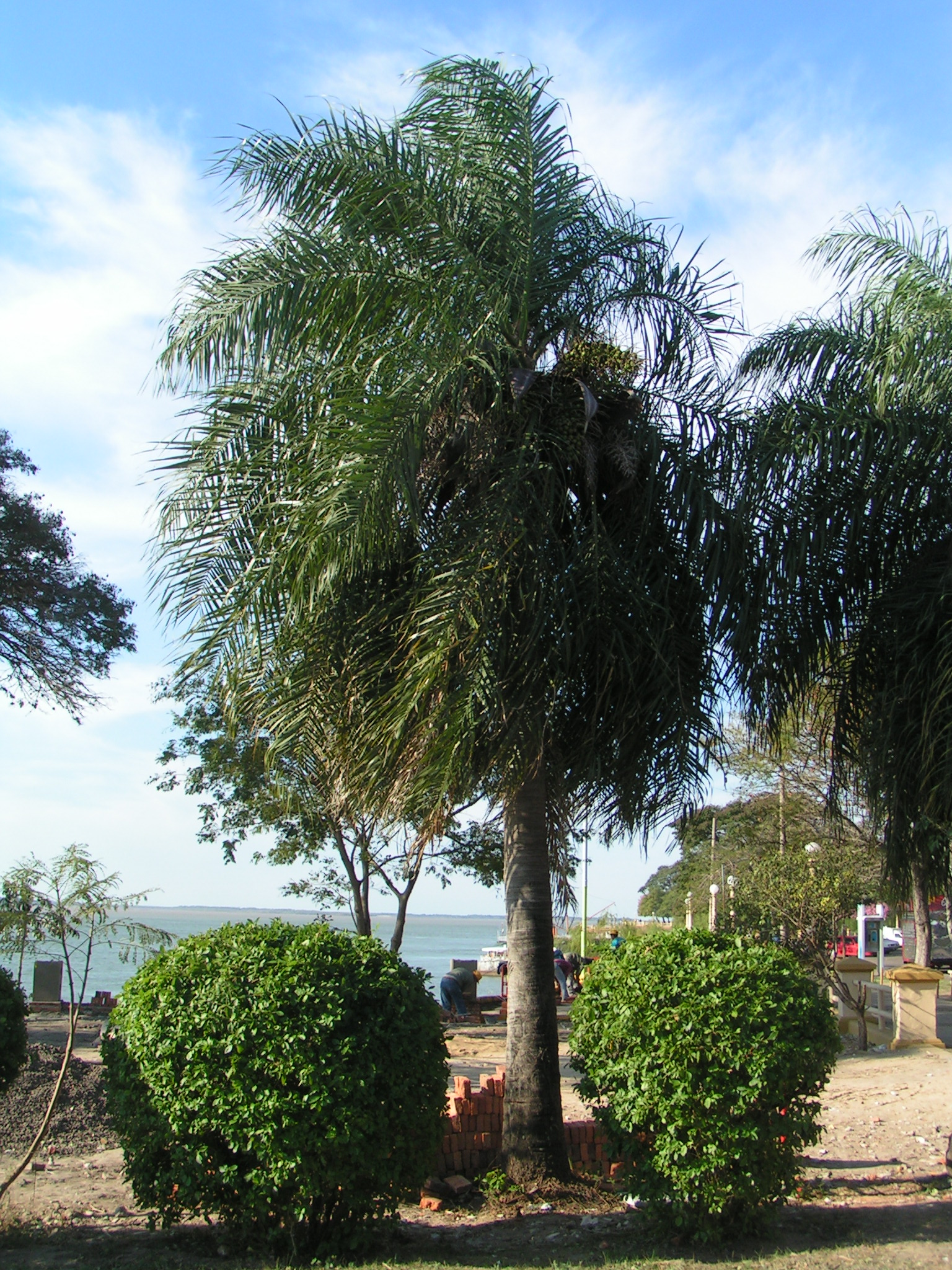
Acrocomia aculeata

The palm family, Arecaceae, is widespread in the Caribbean. Globally there are about 191 genera and 2339 species as reported in 2004 by Carlo Morici. Their distribution is biased toward islands – 36% of genera and 52% of species are found only on islands, while 32% of genera and 6% of species are found only on continents. Sixty-two percent of monotypic genera are found only on islands.

Phytogeographically, the Caribbean region is often considered to include the coastal plains of the United States (including south Florida), Mexico (especially the Yucatan), Belize, Colombia and Venezuela. Most species either have a wide distribution which includes part of the Caribbean, or are endemic to the Greater Antilles. Of the islands in the Caribbean, Cuba has the most species of palm, followed by Hispaniola. The Windward and Leeward Islands have the fewest. The palm flora of Trinidad and Tobago consists primarily of species with a South American distribution. Three genera of palm are endemic to the Greater Antilles: Calyptronoma, Hemithrinax and Zombia. Although nearly ubiquitous in the region, the coconut (Cocos nucifera) is not native to the Caribbean. The Caribbean species in the genus Copernicia are all Greater Antillean endemics; two species are restricted to Hispaniola, while the others are restricted to Cuba.

== Genera ==
Nomenclature follows the Arecaceae section of the World Checklist of Selected Plant Families.

=== Acoelorraphe ===
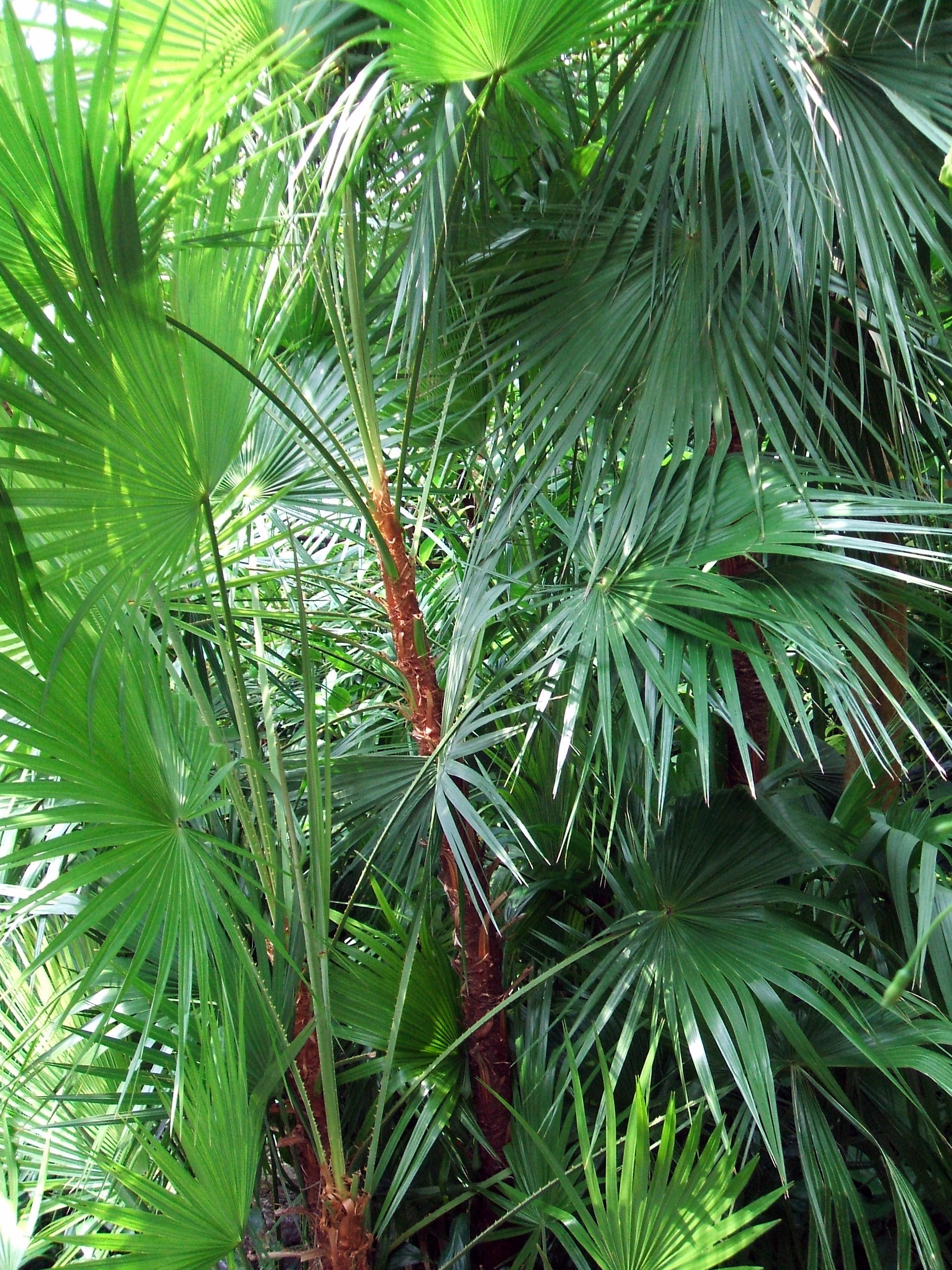
Acoelorraphe wrightii

Acoelorraphe is a monotypic genus which is distributed around the margins of the Caribbean Sea, from Florida to San Andrés and Providencia, Colombian islands in the western Caribbean. The tree is a slender fan palm growing up to 7 metres (23 ft) tall, usually with many stems clustered together. Acoelorraphe is a sister genus to Serenoa (Saw Palmetto), which is endemic to the southeastern United States. The species usually grows in low-lying areas near sea level, often in flooded woodlands or thickets in savannas.

- Acoelorraphe wrightii: Bahamas (Andros, Eleuthera, New Providence), Cuba (west Cuba and Isle of Youth), San Andrés and Providencia (Colombia); also present on the Caribbean coastal areas of south Florida, Mexico, Belize, Nicaragua and Costa Rica.

=== Acrocomia ===
Acrocomia is a genus of spiny palms found throughout the Neotropics, from Mexico to Argentina and throughout the Caribbean. Since it covers such a large range and is highly variable, as many as 40 species have been described in this genus. Most authors recognise only three species, A. aculeata, A. crispa and A. hassleri, but others considers A. media to be distinct from A. aculeata. Caribbean species have single, spiny stems 4–18 metres (13–59 ft) tall.

- Acrocomia aculeata: Cuba, Dominican Republic, Haiti, Jamaica, Leeward Islands, Windward Islands and Trinidad and Tobago (also Mexico, Central and South America).
- Acrocomia crispa: Cuba; until recently this species was considered to belong to a monotypic genus, Gastrococos.
- Acrocomia media: Puerto Rico and the Virgin Islands.

=== Aiphanes ===
Aiphanes is a genus of small to medium-sized spiny palms. Caribbean species have solitary stems and are 3 to 18 metres (10 to 59 ft) tall. Most of the 23 species of Aiphanes are found in the Andes; two species occur in the Caribbean, including A. minima, which is endemic to the region. Although many sources (e.g., Henderson et al. 1995) consider the name A. aculeata to have precedence over A. horrida, in keeping with the nomenclature of the World checklist, the latter name is used.

- Aiphanes horrida: Trinidad (also tropical South America).
- Aiphanes minima: Dominican Republic, Puerto Rico, Martinique, Dominica, Saint Lucia, Saint Vincent, Barbados and Grenada.

=== Astrocaryum ===
Astrocaryum is a genus of spiny palms native to Mexico, Trinidad, Central and South America; the sharp, flattened spines that cover the trunk can be up to 30 cm (12 inches) long. The Caribbean species has solitary stems, 8 to 20 metres (26 to 66 ft) tall. There are about 36 species in the genus. One of them, A. aculeatum, occurs in the insular Caribbean, while four others are found in the wider Caribbean: Astrocaryum alatum on the Caribbean coast from Panama to Nicaragua, A. confertum on the Caribbean coast of Panama and Costa Rica, A. mexicanum along the Caribbean coast from Mexico to Nicaragua, and A. standleyanum on the Caribbean coast of Panama.

- Astrocaryum aculeatum: Trinidad (also tropical South America).

=== Attalea ===
Attalea is a large genus which includes some of the largest Neotropical palms. Three of the 67 species are present in the insular Caribbean, but two of these are restricted to Trinidad and Tobago which is on the continental shelf. The third species, A. crassispantha, is endemic to southwest Haiti; due to its very small population size, it is classified as a critically endangered species Three other species occur in the wider Caribbean: Attalea allenii along the Caribbean coast of Panama and Colombia, A. cohune on the Caribbean coast from Mexico to Nicaragua and A. iguadummat on the Caribbean coast of Panama.

- Attalea crassispatha: southwest Haiti.
- Attalea maripa: Trinidad (also tropical South America).
- Attalea osmantha: Trinidad and Tobago (also northern Venezuela).

=== Bactris ===
Bactris is a genus of palms which is found from southern Mexico to northern Paraguay. It is one of the largest and most diverse palm genera in the neotropics. Most species are medium-sized spiny palms with clustered stems. Most of the species present in the Caribbean are spiny trees 1 to 10 metres (3 to 33 ft) tall with clustered stems and pinnate leaves; B simplicifrons is smaller (0.5–2 m) and often has simple leaves and no spines.

Seven of the 75 species in the genus Bactris occur in the insular Caribbean. Three species - B. cubensis, B. jamaicana and B. plumeriana are Greater Antillean endemics, while the other four are South American species which extend north into Trinidad and Tobago. Salzman and Judd consider the three Greater Antillean species of Bactris to form a clade with B. plumeriana and B. jamaicana as sister species. Fifteen other species occur in the wider Caribbean: Bactris barronis on the Caribbean coast of Panama and Colombia, B. caudata on the Caribbean coast from Nicaragua to Panama, B. charnleyae on the Caribbean coast of Panama, B. coloniata on the Caribbean coast of Panama, B. coloradonis on the Caribbean coast from Costa Rica to Colombia, B. gasipaes on the Caribbean coast from Mexico to Venezuela, B. glandulosa on the Caribbean coast from Costa Rica, to Colombia, B. gracilor on the Caribbean coast from Nicaragua, to Panama, B. grayumi on the Caribbean coast of Nicaragua and Costa Rica, B. guineensis on the Caribbean coast of Colombia and Venezuela, B. hondurensis along the Caribbean coast from Honduras to Colombia, B. maraja along the Caribbean coast from Costa Rica to Colombia, B. mexicana along the Caribbean coast from Belize to Nicaragua, B. militaris along the Caribbean coast of Costa Rica and B. panamensis along the Caribbean coast of Panama.

- Bactris campestris: Trinidad and Tobago (also tropical South America).
- Bactris cubensis: eastern Cuba.
- Bactris jamaicana: Jamaica.
- Bactris major: Trinidad and Tobago (also Mexico to tropical South America).
- Bactris plumeriana: Hispaniola.
- Bactris setulosa: Trinidad and Tobago (also Venezuela, Colombia, Ecuador and Peru).
- Bactris simplicifrons: Trinidad and Tobago (also tropical South America).

=== Calyptronoma ===
Palms in the genus Calyptronoma have pinnately compound leaves and large, solitary stems 4 to 15 metres (13 to 49 ft) tall. The genus is endemic to the Greater Antilles, inhabiting wet areas near streams. Calyptronoma is closely related to the Central American genus Calyptrogyne.

- Calyptronoma occidentalis: Jamaica.
- Calyptronoma plumeriana: Cuba and Hispaniola.
- Calyptronoma rivalis: Hispaniola and Puerto Rico.

=== Coccothrinax ===
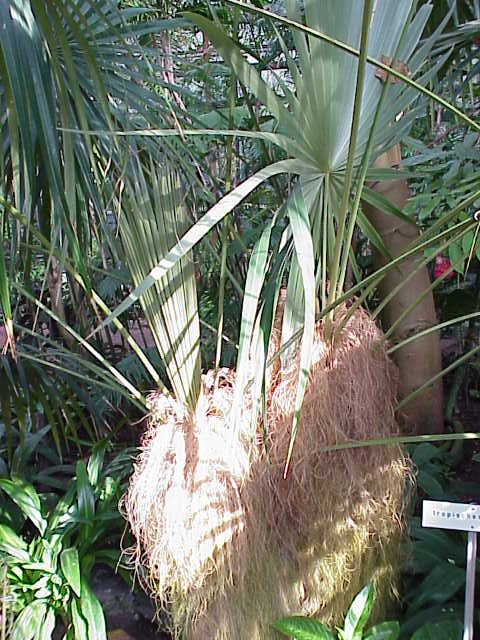
Coccothrinax crinita

Coccothrinax is a genus of fan palms found throughout the Caribbean and in adjacent parts of southern Florida and Mexico. Most species are small to medium-sized, with maximum heights between 5 and 15 metres (17 and 49 ft). Only one of the 55 species, C. readii, is absent from the insular Caribbean. Two species, C. argentata and C. barbadensis, are widespread, while most of the others are restricted to Cuba and Hispaniola.

- Coccothrinax acuminata: Cuba.
- Coccothrinax acunana: Pico Turquino, Cuba.
- Coccothrinax alexandri: east Cuba.
- Coccothrinax alta: Puerto Rico and the Virgin Islands.
- Coccothrinax argentata: Bahamas, Florida Keys and San Andrés Island (also south Florida and southeast Mexico).
- Coccothrinax argentea: Haiti and the Dominican Republic.
- Coccothrinax baracoensis: southeast Cuba.
- Coccothrinax barbadensis: Leeward Islands, Windward Islands, Netherlands Antilles and Trinidad and Tobago.
- Coccothrinax bermudezii: southeast Cuba.
- Coccothrinax borhidiana: Matanzas Province, Cuba.
- Coccothrinax boschiana: Dominican Republic.
- Coccothrinax camagueyana: east central Cuba.
- Coccothrinax clarensis: east Cuba.
- Coccothrinax concolor: Haiti.
- Coccothrinax crinita: Cuba.
- Coccothrinax cupularis: south Cuba.
- Coccothrinax ekmanii: Haiti and the Dominican Republic.
- Coccothrinax elegans: Cuba.
- Coccothrinax fagildei: Cuba.
- Coccothrinax fragrans: east Cuba and Haiti.
- Coccothrinax garciana: Holguín Province, Cuba.
- Coccothrinax gracilis: Haiti and the Dominican Republic.
- Coccothrinax guantanamensis: east Cuba.
- Coccothrinax gundlachii: central and east Cuba.
- Coccothrinax hioramii: east Cuba.
- Coccothrinax inaguensis: Bahamas.
- Coccothrinax jamaicensis: Jamaica.
- Coccothrinax jimenezii: Hispaniola
- Coccothrinax leonis: Cuba.
- Coccothrinax litoralis: Cuba.
- Coccothrinax macroglossa: east Cuba.
- Coccothrinax microphylla: east Cuba.
- Coccothrinax miraguama: Cuba.
- Coccothrinax moaensis: east Cuba.
- Coccothrinax montana: Haiti.
- Coccothrinax munizii: east Cuba.
- Coccothrinax muricata: east central Cuba.
- Coccothrinax nipensis: east Cuba.
- Coccothrinax orientalis: east Cuba.
- Coccothrinax pauciramosa: east Cuba.
- Coccothrinax proctorii: Cayman Islands.
- Coccothrinax pseudorigida: east central Cuba.
- Coccothrinax pumila: Cuba.
- Coccothrinax rigida: east Cuba.
- Coccothrinax salvatoris: east and east central Cuba.
- Coccothrinax saxicola: east Cuba.
- Coccothrinax scoparia: Haiti.
- Coccothrinax spirituana: Cuba.
- Coccothrinax spissa: Haiti and the Dominican Republic.
- Coccothrinax torrida: Cuba.
- Coccothrinax trinitensis: east central Cuba.
- Coccothrinax victorinii: east Cuba.
- Coccothrinax yunquensis: south Cuba.
- Coccothrinax yuraguana: west Cuba.

=== Colpothrinax ===
Colpothrinax is a genus of solitary-stemmed palmate-leaved palms native to Central America and the Caribbean. There are three species of Colpothrinax: C. aphanopetala and C. cookii which are restricted to Central America, and C. wrightii which is a Cuban endemic.

- Colpothrinax wrightii: southwest Cuba including the Isle of Youth.

=== Copernicia ===
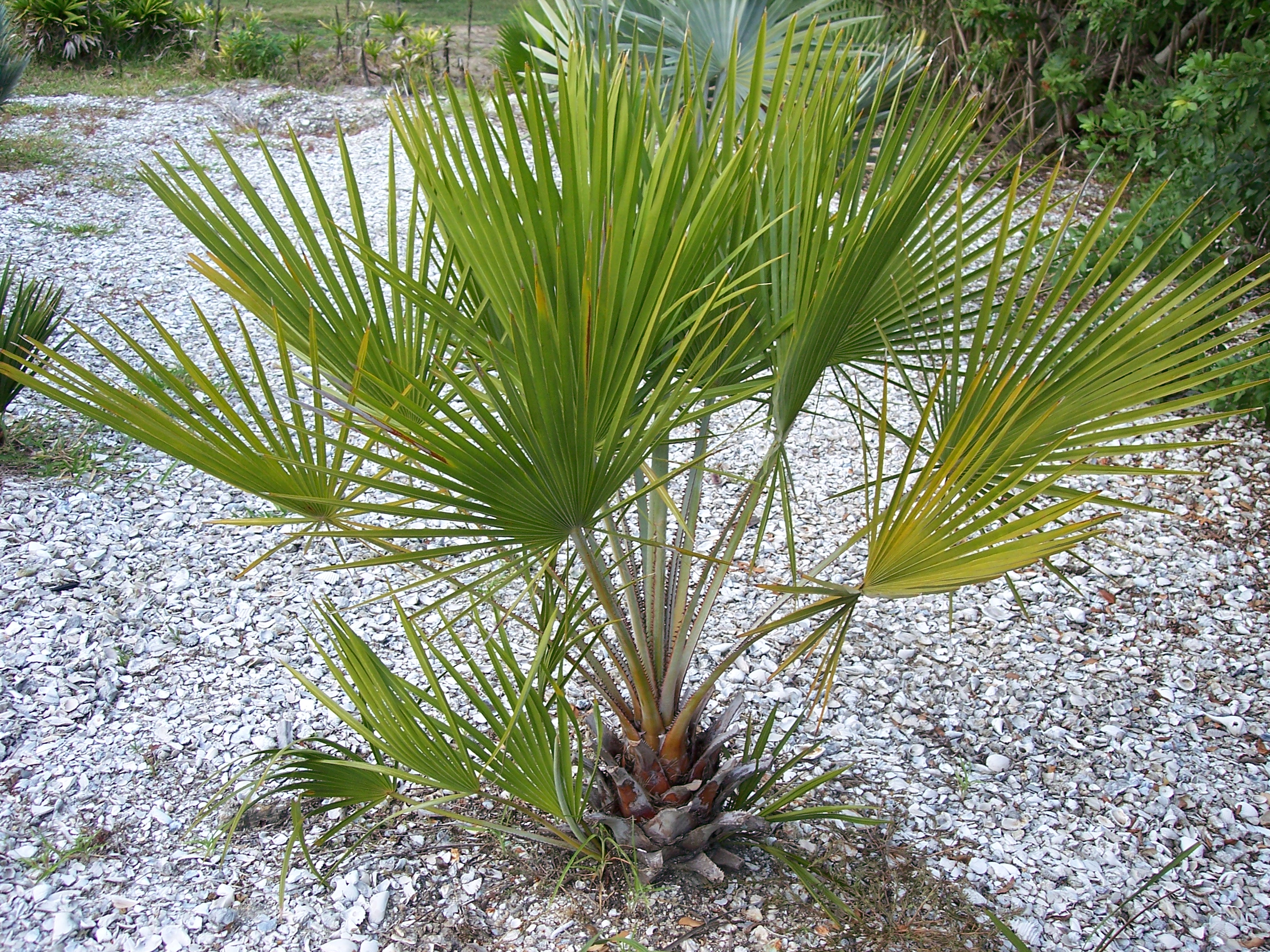
Copernicia glabrescens

Copernicia is a moderately large genus of spiny, fan palms found in the Caribbean and South America. The Caribbean species are all Greater Antillean endemics; two species are restricted to Hispaniola, while the others are restricted to Cuba. Three species are absent from the insular Caribbean: C. alba and C. prunifera, which are found in South America away from the Caribbean, and C. tectorum which is found in northern Venezuela and along the Caribbean coast of Colombia.

- Copernicia baileyana: east and central Cuba.
- Copernicia berteroana: Haiti and the Dominican Republic.
- Copernicia brittonorum: west and west central Cuba.
- Copernicia × burretiana: Cuba.
- Copernicia cowellii: Camagüey Province, Cuba.
- Copernicia curbeloi: Cuba.
- Copernicia curtissii: Cuba.
- Copernicia ekmanii: northern Haiti.
- Copernicia × escarzana: Cuba.
- Copernicia fallaensis: Cuba.
- Copernicia gigas: east Cuba.
- Copernicia glabrescens: west and west central Cuba.
- Copernicia hospita: Cuba.
- Copernicia humicola: Cuba.
- Copernicia longiglossa: east Cuba.
- Copernicia macroglossa: west and central Cuba.
- Copernicia molinetii: Cuba.
- Copernicia × occidentalis: Cuba.
- Copernicia rigida: east and central Cuba.
- Copernicia roigii: Cuba.
- Copernicia × shaferi: Cuba.
- Copernicia × sueroana: Cuba.
- Copernicia × textilis: Cuba.
- Copernicia × vespertilionum: Cuba.
- Copernicia yarey: Cuba.

=== Desmoncus ===
Desmoncus is a genus of spiny, scrambling, pinnate-leaved palms which range from Mexico in the north to Bolivia and Brazil in the south. Ten of the twelve species in have solely continental distributions. Two species are found on both the mainland and in the insular Caribbean.

- Desmoncus orthacanthos: Trinidad and Tobago (also tropical South America).
- Desmoncus polyacanthos: Saint Vincent and the Grenadines and Trinidad and Tobago (also tropical South America).

=== Euterpe ===
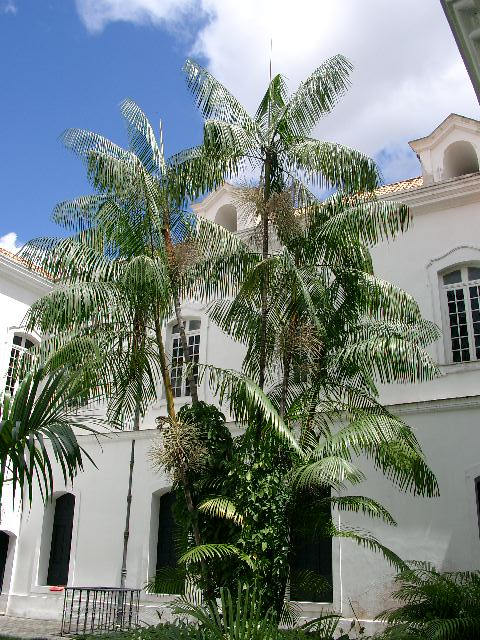
Euterpe oleracea

Euterpe consists of seven slender-stemmed, pinnate-leaved palms native to the Caribbean, Central and South America. The genus has been described as containing "the most beautiful American palms". Four of the seven species are restricted to South America away from the Caribbean, two are found in Central and South America and the insular Caribbean, and E. broadwayi is endemic to the eastern Caribbean.

- Euterpe broadwayi: Dominica, Grenada, Saint Vincent and the Grenadines and Trinidad and Tobago.
- Euterpe oleracea: Trinidad and Tobago (also tropical South America).
- Euterpe precatoria: Trinidad and Tobago (also Central and South America).

=== Gaussia ===
Gaussia is a genus of solitary, pinnate palms found in the Caribbean, northern Central America and southern Mexico. There are five species in the genus - three are endemic to the Greater Antilles, while G. gomez-pompae and G. maya are found in the Caribbean coastal region of Mexico, Belize and Guatemala.

- Gaussia attenuata: Dominican Republic and Puerto Rico.
- Gaussia princeps: western Cuba.
- Gaussia spirituana: Sierra de Jatibonico in east-central Cuba.

=== Geonoma ===
Geonoma is a genus of small to medium-sized palms which grow in the forest understorey. The genus is one of the largest in the neotropics. The genus consists of 64 species, two of which are found in the insular Caribbean. Ten other species are found in the wider Caribbean: G. chococola, G. concinna, G. divisia and G. triandra are found on the Caribbean coast of Panama, G. congesta is found along the Caribbean coast from Honduras to Colombia, G. cuneata is found along the Caribbean coast from Nicaragua to Colombia, G. deversa is found along the Caribbean coast from Belize to Colombia, G. epetiolaris and G. longevaginata are found along the Caribbean coast from Costa Rica to Panama and G. triandra is found along the Caribbean coast of Panama and Colombia.

- Geonoma interrupta: Haiti, Windward Islands and Trinidad and Tobago (also Mexico, Central and South America).
- Geonoma undata: Windward Islands (also Mexico, Central America and western tropical South America).

=== Hemithrinax ===
Hemithrinax is a genus of fan palms which are endemic to Cuba. Many authors include these species in the genus Thrinax.

- Hemithrinax compacta: Cuba.
- Hemithrinax rivularis: Cuba.

=== Leucothrinax ===
Leucothrinax is a monotypic genus of fan palms which is native to the northern Caribbean. The species was split from the genus Thrinax after phylogenetic studies showed that its inclusion in Thrinax would render that genus paraphyletic.

- Leucothrinax morrisii: Florida Keys, Bahamas, Cuba, Haiti, Puerto Rico, Navassa Island and the Leeward Islands.

=== Manicaria ===
Manicaria is a genus of pinnate-leaved palms. One species, M. saccifera is found from Belize to Brazil and Peru, while the other M. martiana is found in southeastern Colombia and northern Brazil.

- Manicaria saccifera: Trinidad and Tobago (also tropical Central and South America).

=== Mauritia ===
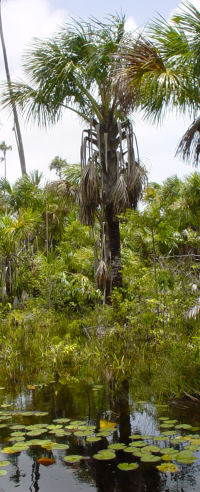
Mauritia flexuosa

Mauritia is a genus of fan palms which is native to northern South America. One species has a wide distribution which extends into the insular Caribbean, while the other M. carana is restricted to the Amazon region.

- Mauritia flexuosa: Trinidad (also tropical South America).

=== Oenocarpus ===
Oenocarpus is a genus of pinnate-leaved palms found in Central and South America. Oenocarpus bataua is found in Trinidad and along the Caribbean coast of Venezuela, while O. mapora is found on the Caribbean coast of Venezuela and Panama.

- Oenocarpus bataua: Trinidad (also tropical Panama and South America).

=== Prestoea ===
Prestoea is a genus of pinnate-leaved palms found in Central and South America and the Caribbean. It is closely related to the genus Euterpe. Two species are found in the Caribbean - P. pubigera is found in Trinidad, and P. acuminata is found throughout most of the Caribbean. Four other species, P. decurrens, P. ensiformis, P. longipetiolata and P. pubens are found along the Caribbean coast of Central America.

- Prestoea acuminata: Cuba, Dominican Republic, Haiti, Puerto Rico, Leeward Islands, Windward Islands and Trinidad and Tobago (also Central and South America).
- Prestoea pubigera: Trinidad (also northwest Venezuela).

=== Pseudophoenix ===
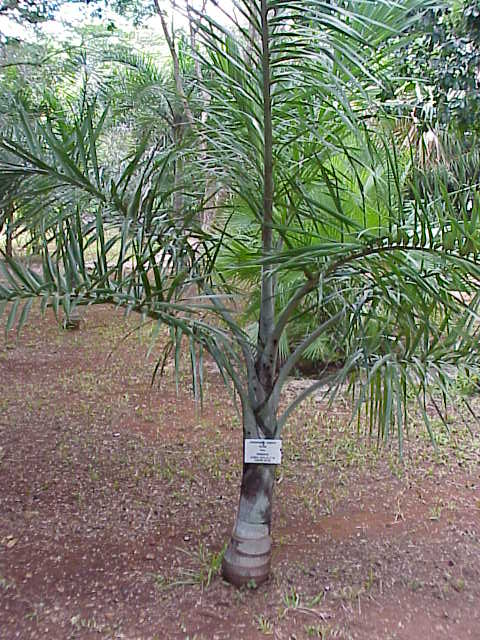
Pseudophoenix sargentii

Pseudophoenix is a genus of pinnate-leaved palms found throughout the Caribbean. Three species are endemic to the Greater Antilles, while the fourth, P. sargentii, is widely distributed in the northern Caribbean and adjacent portions of the Central and North American mainland.

- Pseudophoenix ekmanii: Dominican Republic.
- Pseudophoenix lediniana: southwest Haiti.
- Pseudophoenix sargentii: Bahamas, Cuba, Dominican Republic, Haiti, Florida Keys, Puerto Rico, Navassa Island, Turks and Caicos Islands and the Windward Islands (also Mexico and Belize).
- Pseudophoenix vinifera: Haiti and southwest Dominican Republic.

=== Reinhardtia ===
Reinhardtia is a genus of simple or palmate-leaved palms found in the wider Caribbean, between Mexico and Colombia, with a single disjunct species which is endemic to Hispaniola. All species are small (1 to 6 metres [3 to 20 ft] tall) and inhabit the forest understorey.

- Reinhardtia paiewonskiana: southwest Dominican Republic.

=== Roystonea ===
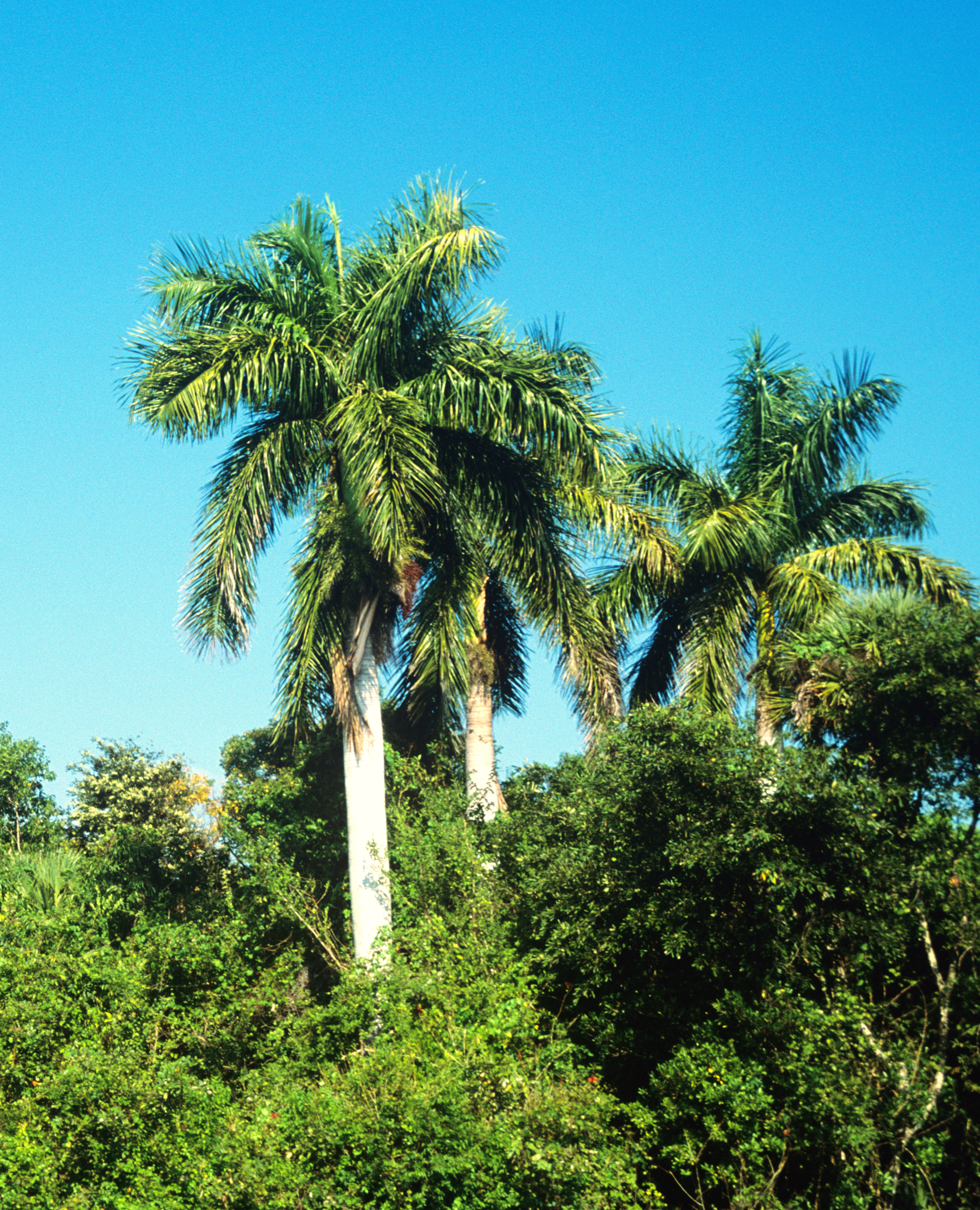
Roystonea regia

Roystonea is a genus of pinnate-leaved palms which range from south Florida and Mexico south to Venezuela. Seven species are endemic to the Greater Antilles and the Virgin Islands - four of these are Cuban endemics. The only species which is absent from the insular Caribbean, R. dunlapiana, is found on the Caribbean coast of Mexico, Honduras and Nicaragua.

- Roystonea altissima: Jamaica.
- Roystonea borinquena: Dominican Republic, Haiti, Puerto Rico and the Virgin Islands.
- Roystonea lenis: east Cuba.
- Roystonea maisiana: east Cuba.
- Roystonea oleracea: Leeward Islands, Windward Islands and Trinidad and Tobago (also Venezuela and Colombia).
- Roystonea princeps: southwest Jamaica.
- Roystonea regia: Bahamas, Cayman Islands and Cuba (also Florida, Mexico and Central America).
- Roystonea stellata: east Cuba.
- Roystonea violacea: east Cuba.

=== Sabal ===
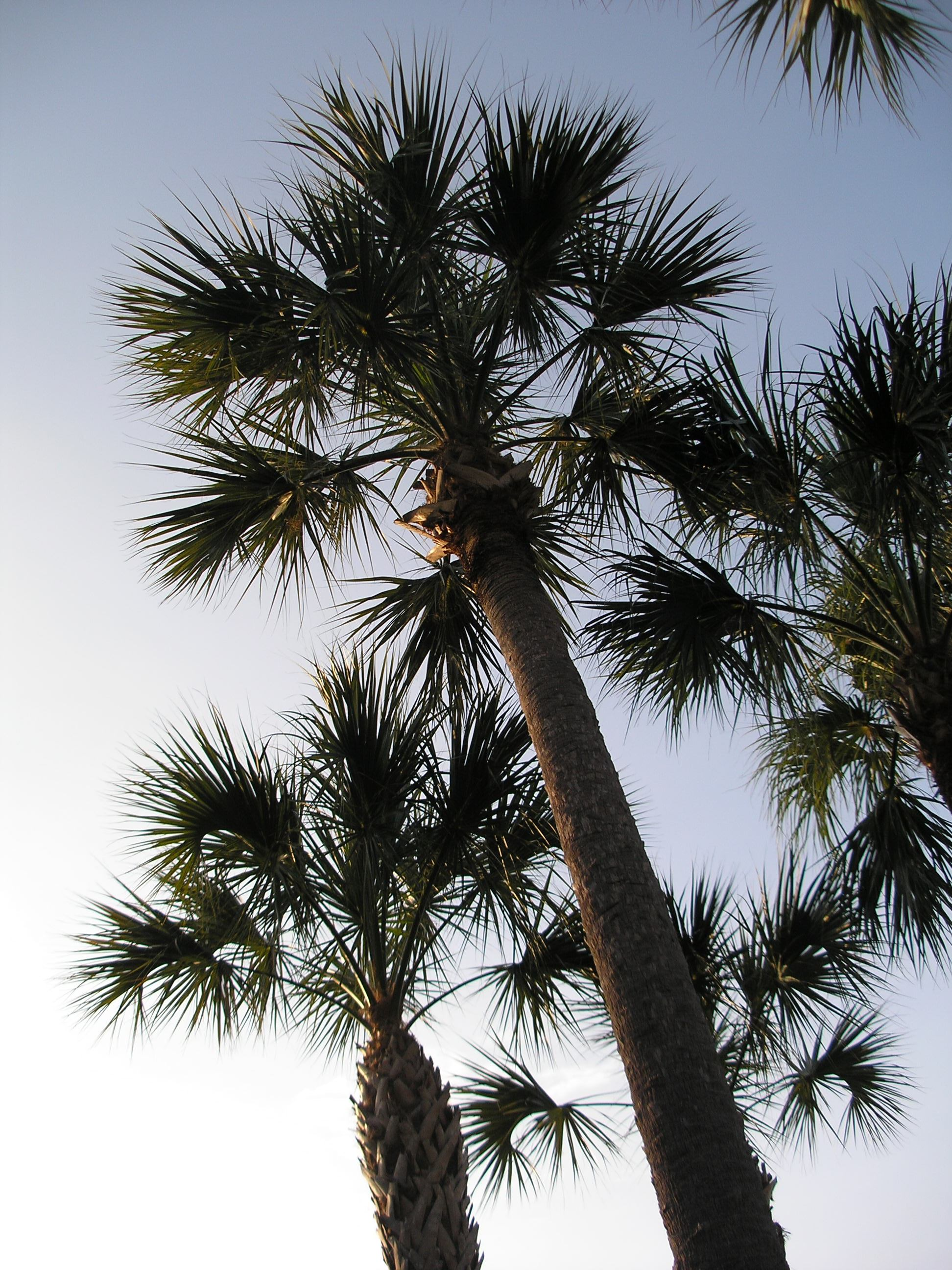
Sabal palmetto

Sabal is a genus of fan palms. Six of the sixteen species are native to the insular Caribbean - three of which are endemic to the Greater Antilles and the Virgin Islands. A seventh species, S. bermudana, is endemic to Bermuda. Sabal etonia and S. miamiensis are found along the Atlantic coast of Florida, S. gretheriae is found on the Caribbean coast of the Yucatan, S. mexicana is found along the Caribbean coast of Mexico into south Texas, S. minor is found along the Gulf Coast of the United States.

- Sabal causiarum: Haiti, Dominican Republic, Puerto Rico and the Virgin Islands.
- Sabal domingensis: Cuba, Haiti and the Dominican Republic.
- Sabal maritima: Cuba and Jamaica.
- Sabal mauritiiformis: Trinidad (also Mexico to Venezuela).
- Sabal palmetto: Bahamas, Cuba and Turks and Caicos Islands (also southeast United States).
- Sabal yapa: western Cuba (also Mexico and Belize).

=== Syagrus ===
Syagrus is a genus of primarily South American palms. Thirty of the thirty-one species are South American; the other, S. amara, is endemic to the Lesser Antilles. One species, S. orinocensis is found on the Caribbean coast of Venezuela.

- Syagrus amara: Montserrat, Guadeloupe, Dominica, Martinique and Saint Lucia; coastal areas below 300 m.

=== Thrinax ===
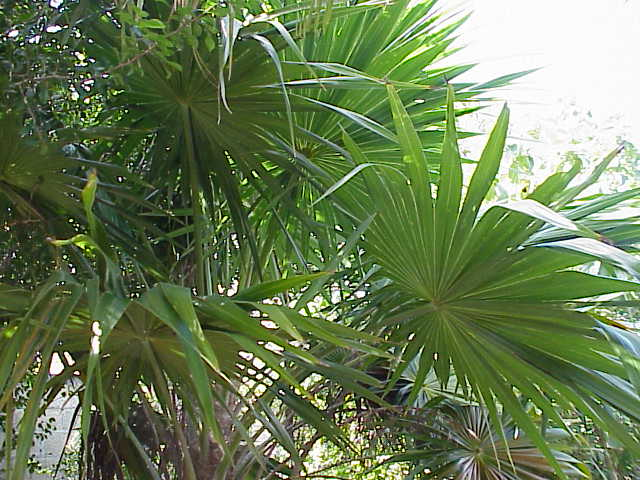
Thrinax radiata

Thrinax is a genus of fan palms. Three of the four species of are endemic to the insular Caribbean, while the fourth occurs in the insular Caribbean and in Florida, Mexico and Central America. Three species are single-island endemics - two to Jamaica and one to Cuba.

- Thrinax ekmaniana: Cuba.
- Thrinax excelsa: Jamaica.
- Thrinax parviflora: Jamaica.
- Thrinax radiata: Bahamas, Cayman Islands, Cuba, Jamaica, Haiti, the Dominican Republic and Navassa Island (also Florida, Mexico and Central America).

=== Zombia ===
Zombia is a monotypic genus of fan palms which is endemic to Hispaniola. Individuals are up to 3 m (10 ft) tall and grow in dry, hilly regions. It is restricted to serpentine soils, at least in the Dominican Republic.

- Zombia antillarum: Dominican Republic and Haiti.

== See also ==
- List of trees of the Caribbean
- List of Arecaceae genera
