= Roystonea palaea =

Roystonea palaea Temporal range: Burdigalian

Scientific classification
- Kingdom: Plantae
- Clade: Tracheophytes
- Clade: Angiosperms
- Clade: Monocots
- Clade: Commelinids
- Order: Arecales
- Family: Arecaceae
- Genus: Roystonea
- Species: †R. palaea

Binomial name
- †Roystonea palaea Poinar, 2002

Extinct species of palm

Roystonea palaea is an extinct species of palm known from fossil flowers found in the early Miocene Burdigalian stage Dominican amber deposits on the island of Hispaniola. The species is known from a single staminate flower and a single pistillate flower both preserved in the same piece of amber. The amber specimen bearing the holotype and paratype is currently deposited in the collections of the Oregon State University in Corvallis, Oregon, as number "Sd–9–101", where it was studied and described by George Poinar. Poinar published his 2002 type description for R. palaea in the Botanical Journal of the Linnean Society, Volume 139. The species' second name is taken from the Greek word palaios meaning "ancient". The amber specimen bearing the flowers was excavated from the La Toca mine northeast of Santiago de los Caballeros, Dominican Republic.

== Taxonomy ==
R. palaea has been placed in the Arecoideae genus Roystonea, which has ten modern genera native to the islands of the Caribbean, and to Florida, Central and South America.

== Description ==
Many of the characters used to separate modern species of Roystonea, including coloration, are not visible in the preserved flowers. The fossil flowers have darkened to shades of brown, with only the anthers retaining a light whitish color. Of the modern genera the R. palaea flowers are similar in structure, R. oleracea and R. dunlapiana both having a similar petal to sepal length ratio. R. palaea is most distinguishable from modern species by the large size of the calyx. The three species differ in the shape and length of their sepals, R. palaea having the longest of the species while R. dunlapiana has the shortest. R. oleracea also possesses longer anthers at 3.5–4.7 millimetres (0.14–0.19 in)which are recurved at the tips, unlike R. palaea, with anthers 1.7–3.1 millimetres (0.067–0.122 in) and straight. Along with the shorter sepal length R. dunlapiana also has purple anthers, differing from the light-colored anthers of R. palaea.

== Possible ecology ==
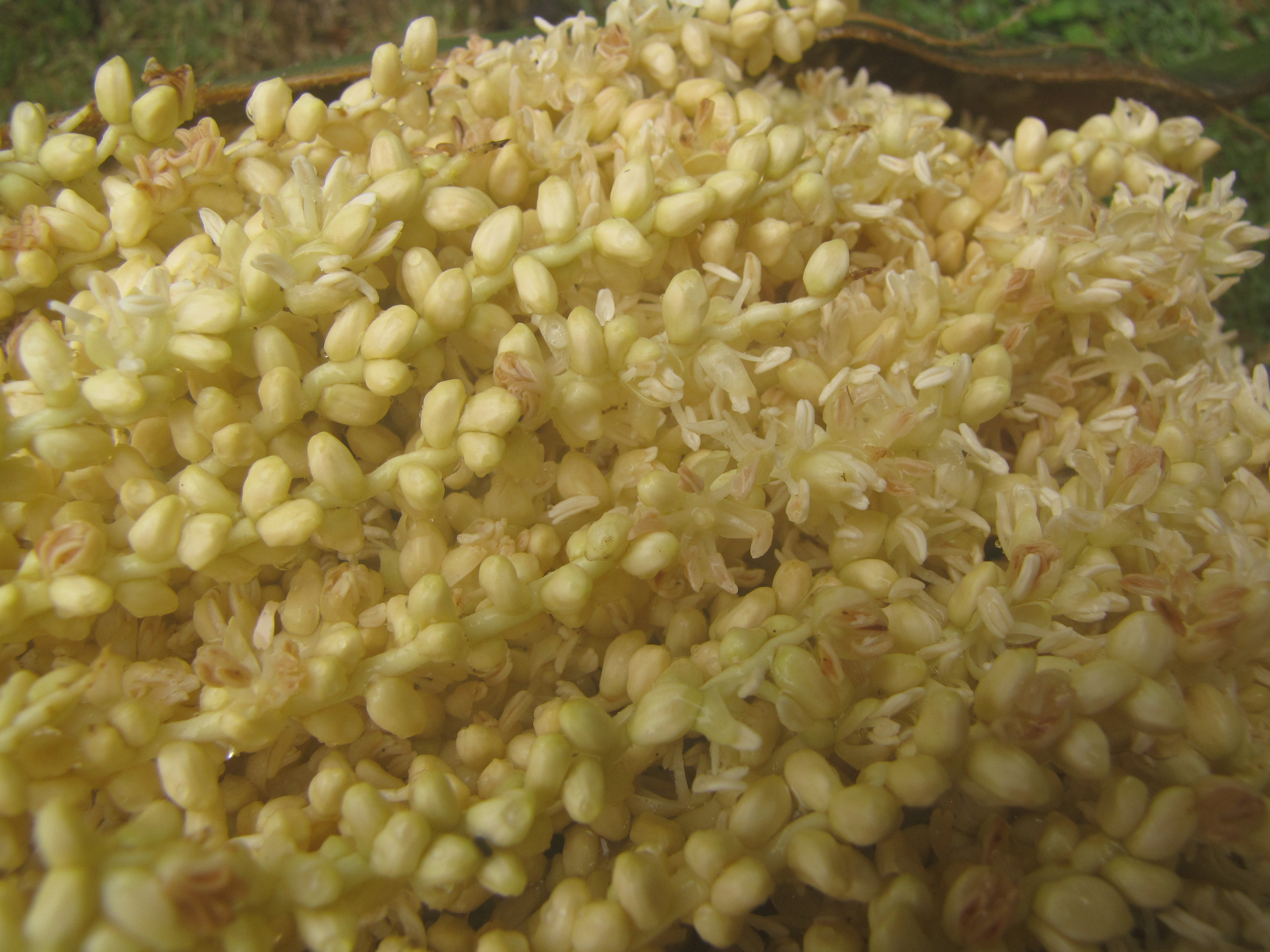
Modern-day Roystonea regia flowers

Of note is the damage which is present on the pistillate flower. One side of the flower is preserved, having the perianth ripped off exposing the center of the flower and the developing fruit, which has two scratches on the exposed side. Poinar proposes that the damages may have occurred due to an herbivore seizing the flower and subsequently dropping it in the soft tree resin, which afterward fossilized. This is supported by many of the modern Roystonea species having oily fruits that are eaten by a number of bird and bat species.
