= Roystonea princeps =

Conservation status
- Near Threatened (IUCN 2.3)

Scientific classification
- Kingdom: Plantae
- Clade: Tracheophytes
- Clade: Angiosperms
- Clade: Monocots
- Clade: Commelinids
- Order: Arecales
- Family: Arecaceae
- Genus: Roystonea
- Species: R. princeps

Binomial name
- Roystonea princeps (Becc.) Burret

Synonyms
- Oreodoxa princeps Becc.

Species of palm

Roystonea princeps, commonly known as Morass cabbage palm or Morass royal palm, is a species of palm which is endemic to western Jamaica.

== Description ==
Roystonea princeps is a large palm which reaches heights of 20 metres (66 ft). Stems are grey-white and range from 27.5–42 centimetres (10.8–16.5 in) in diameter. The upper portion of the stem is encircled by leaf sheaths, forming a green portion known as the crownshaft which is normally about 1.8 m (5.9 ft) long. Individuals have about 15 leaves with 4-metre (13 ft) rachises. The 1.3 m (4.3 ft) inflorescences bear creamy yellow male and female flowers; the anthers of the male flowers are purplish. Fruit are 12.2–16.7 millimetres (0.48–0.66 in) long and 8.4–10.4 mm (0.33–0.41 in) wide, and are purplish-black when ripe.

== Taxonomy ==
For most of the 19th century, only two species of royal palms were generally recognised: Greater Antillean royal palms were considered Oreodoxa regia (now Roystonea regia), while Lesser Antillean ones were considered O. oleracea (R. oleracea). Several new species were recognised early in the 20th century, among them a Jamaican species that was named Oreodoxa princeps by Italian botanist Odoardo Beccari in 1912. Due to problems with the way that the genus Oreodoxa had been applied by taxonomists, American botanist Orator F. Cook had proposed that the name Roystonea (in honour of American general Roy Stone) be applied to the royal palms. In 1929 German botanist Max Burret transferred O. princeps to the genus Roystonea.

=== Common names ===
Roystonea princeps is known as the "Morass cabbage palm", "Morass royal palm", "swamp cabbage" or simply "royal palm".

== Reproduction and growth ==
Thirty-four to 36-year-old individuals grown in cultivation at Fairchild Tropical Garden in Florida grew 20 to 26 centimetres (8 to 10 in) per year.

== Distribution ==
Roystonea princeps is endemic to the western Jamaican parishes of St. Elizabeth and Westmoreland, in wetlands around Black River and Negril.
