= Roystonea maisiana =

Conservation status
- Vulnerable (IUCN 3.1)

Scientific classification
- Kingdom: Plantae
- Clade: Tracheophytes
- Clade: Angiosperms
- Clade: Monocots
- Clade: Commelinids
- Order: Arecales
- Family: Arecaceae
- Genus: Roystonea
- Species: R. maisiana

Binomial name
- Roystonea maisiana (L.H.Bailey) Zona

Synonyms
- R. regia var. maisiana L.H.Bailey

Species of palm

Roystonea maisiana is a species of palm which is endemic to the Maisí region of Guantánamo Province in eastern Cuba.

== Description ==
Roystonea maisiana is a large palm which reaches heights of 20 metres (66 ft). Stems are grey-white and are usually 26–40 centimetres (10–16 in), sometimes up to 51 centimetres (20 in), in diameter. The upper portion of the stem is encircled by leaf sheaths, forming a green portion known as the crownshaft which is normally 1.5 m (4.9 ft) long. Individuals have about 15 leaves with 4.8-metre (16 ft) rachises; the leaves hang well horizontal. The 0.8–1.1 m (2.6–3.6 ft) inflorescences bear white male and female flowers. Fruit are 10–13.7 millimetres (0.39–0.54 in) long and 7.5–9.5 mm (0.30–0.37 in) wide, and black when ripe.
