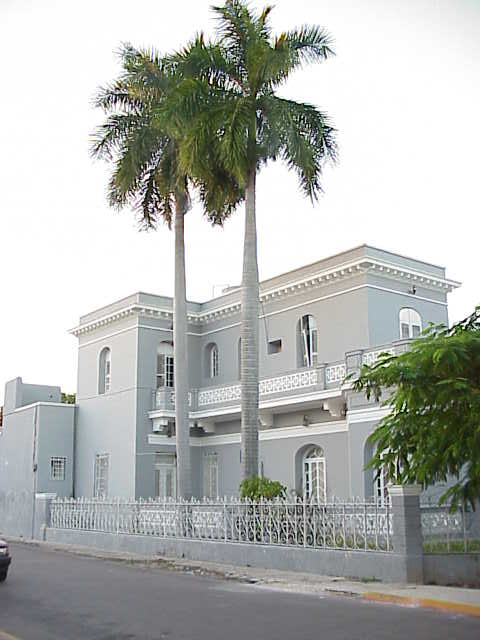

Conservation status
- Least Concern (IUCN 3.1)

Scientific classification
- Kingdom: Plantae
- Clade: Tracheophytes
- Clade: Angiosperms
- Clade: Monocots
- Clade: Commelinids
- Order: Arecales
- Family: Arecaceae
- Genus: Roystonea
- Species: R. dunlapiana

Binomial name
- Roystonea dunlapiana P.H.Allen

= Roystonea dunlapiana =

Species of palm

Roystonea dunlapiana, commonly known as yagua or cabiche, is a species of palm which is native to Mexico, Nicaragua and Honduras. It is the only species in the genus Roystonea which is absent from the insular Caribbean.

== Description ==
Roystonea dunlapiana is a large palm which reaches heights of 20 metres (66 ft). Stems are grey-white and about 38 centimetres (15 in) in diameter. The upper portion of the stem is encircled by leaf sheaths, forming a green portion known as the crownshaft which is about 2 m (6.6 ft) long. Individuals have about 15 leaves with 4-metre (13 ft) rachises; the leaves hang well horizontal. The 1 m (3.3 ft) inflorescences bear white male flowers with purplish anthers; the female flowers are undescribed. Fruit are 12–14.7 millimetres (0.47–0.58 in) long and 7.1–9.5 mm (0.28–0.37 in) wide, and are purplish black when ripe.

== Taxonomy ==
Roystonea is placed in the subfamily Arecoideae and the tribe Roystoneeae. The placement Roystonea within the Arecoideae is uncertain; a phylogeny based on plastid DNA failed to resolve the position of the genus within the Arecoideae. As of 2008, there appear to be no molecular phylogenetic studies of Roystonea and the relationship between R. dunlapiana and the rest of the genus is uncertain.

The species was first described by American botanist Paul H. Allen in 1952. Allen's description of R. dunlapiana, together with his description of R. regia var. hondurensis (now synonymised with typical R. regia) was the first record of Roystonea species native to Central America.

=== Common names ===
The species is commonly known as yagua or cabiche in Honduras.

== Distribution ==
Roystonea dunlapiana is native to southern Mexico (Chiapas, Quintana Roo, Tabasco, Veracruz), Honduras and Nicaragua. In his monograph of the genus, Scott Zona reported that it is "likely to occur in Belize". It grows in estuaries and coastal swamps. It is the only species in the genus Roystonea which is absent from the insular Caribbean.
