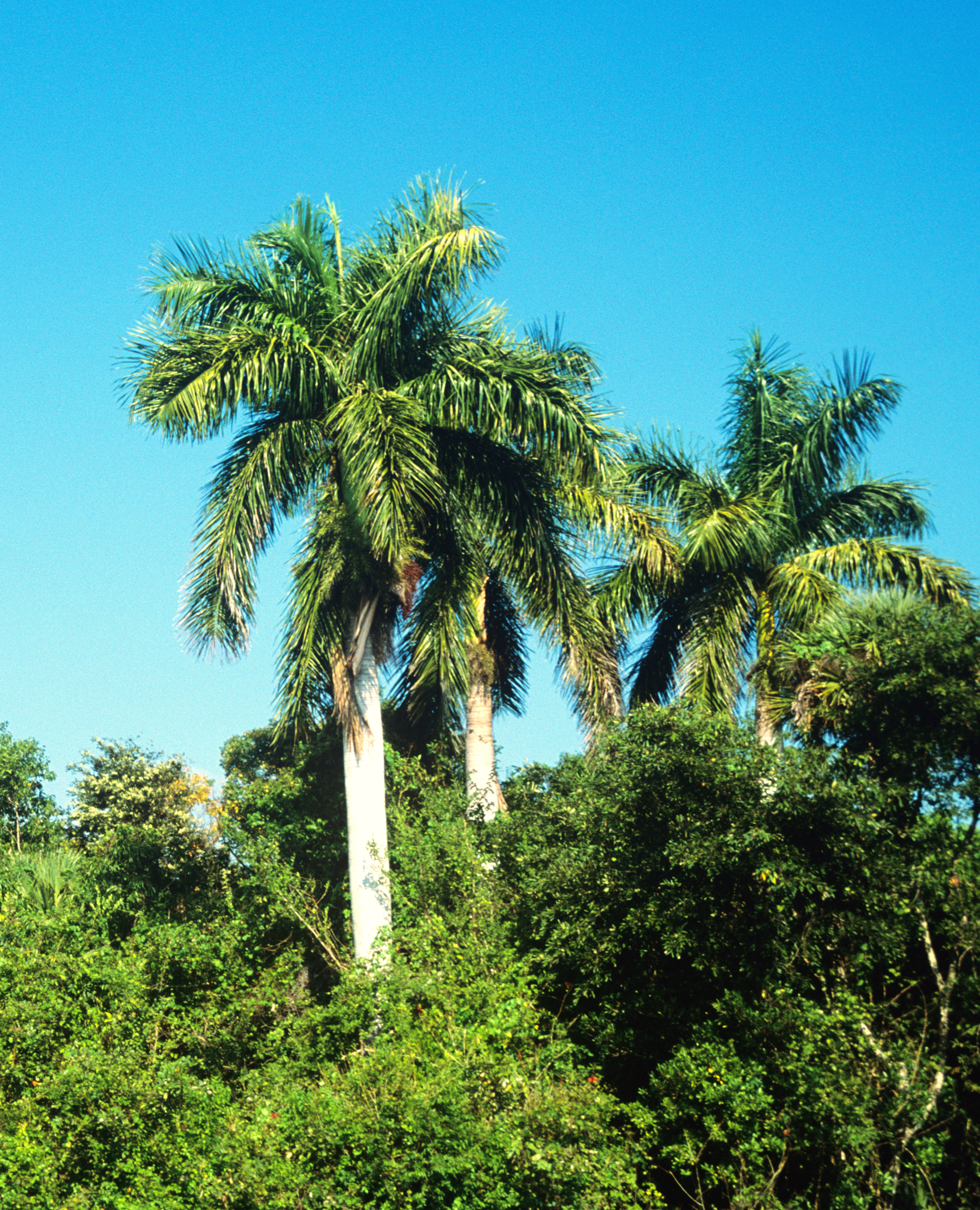
- Roystonea regia

Scientific classification
- Kingdom: Plantae
- Clade: Tracheophytes
- Clade: Angiosperms
- Clade: Monocots
- Clade: Commelinids
- Order: Arecales
- Family: Arecaceae
- Subfamily: Arecoideae
- Tribe: Roystoneae; J.Dransf., N.W.Uhl, Asmussen, W.J.Baker, M.M.Harley & C.Lewis
- Genus: Roystonea; O.F.Cook

Type species
- Roystonea regia (Kunth) O.F.Cook

Synonyms
- Gorgasia O.F.Cook

= Roystonea =

Roystonea Temporal range: Miocene–Recent

Genus of palms

Roystonea is a genus of eleven species of monoecious palms, native to the Neotropics, in the Caribbean, the adjacent coasts of Florida in the United States, Mexico, Central America and northern South America. Commonly known as the royal palms, the genus was named after Roy Stone, a U.S. Army engineer. It contains some of the most recognizable and commonly cultivated palms of tropical and subtropical regions.

== Description ==
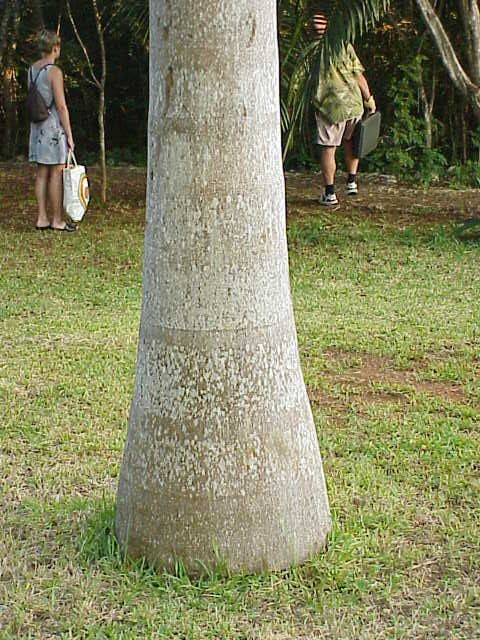
Detail of the base of the stem of Roystonea dunlapiana showing columnar stem and leaf scars

Roystonea is a genus of large, unarmed, single-stemmed palms with pinnate leaves. The large stature and striking appearance of a Roystonea palm makes it a notable aspect of the landscape. The stems, which were compared to stone columns by Louis and Elizabeth Agassiz in 1868, are smooth and columnar, although the trunks of R. altissima and R. maisiana are more slender than those of typical royal palms. Stems often are swollen and bulging along portions of their length, which may reflect years where growing conditions were better or worse than average. Leaf scars are often prominent along the stem, especially in young, rapidly growing individuals. Stem color ranges from gray-white to gray-brown except in R. violacea, which have violet-brown or mauve stems. Royal palm, R. oleracea, reaches heights of 42 metres (138 ft), but most species are in the 15 to 20 m (49 to 66 ft) range. The largest Royal palm is located in Floresta Estadual Edmundo Navarro de Andrade in Rio Claro, São Paulo, Brazil with 42.4 m and was discovered by Vincent Ferh and Mauro Galetti

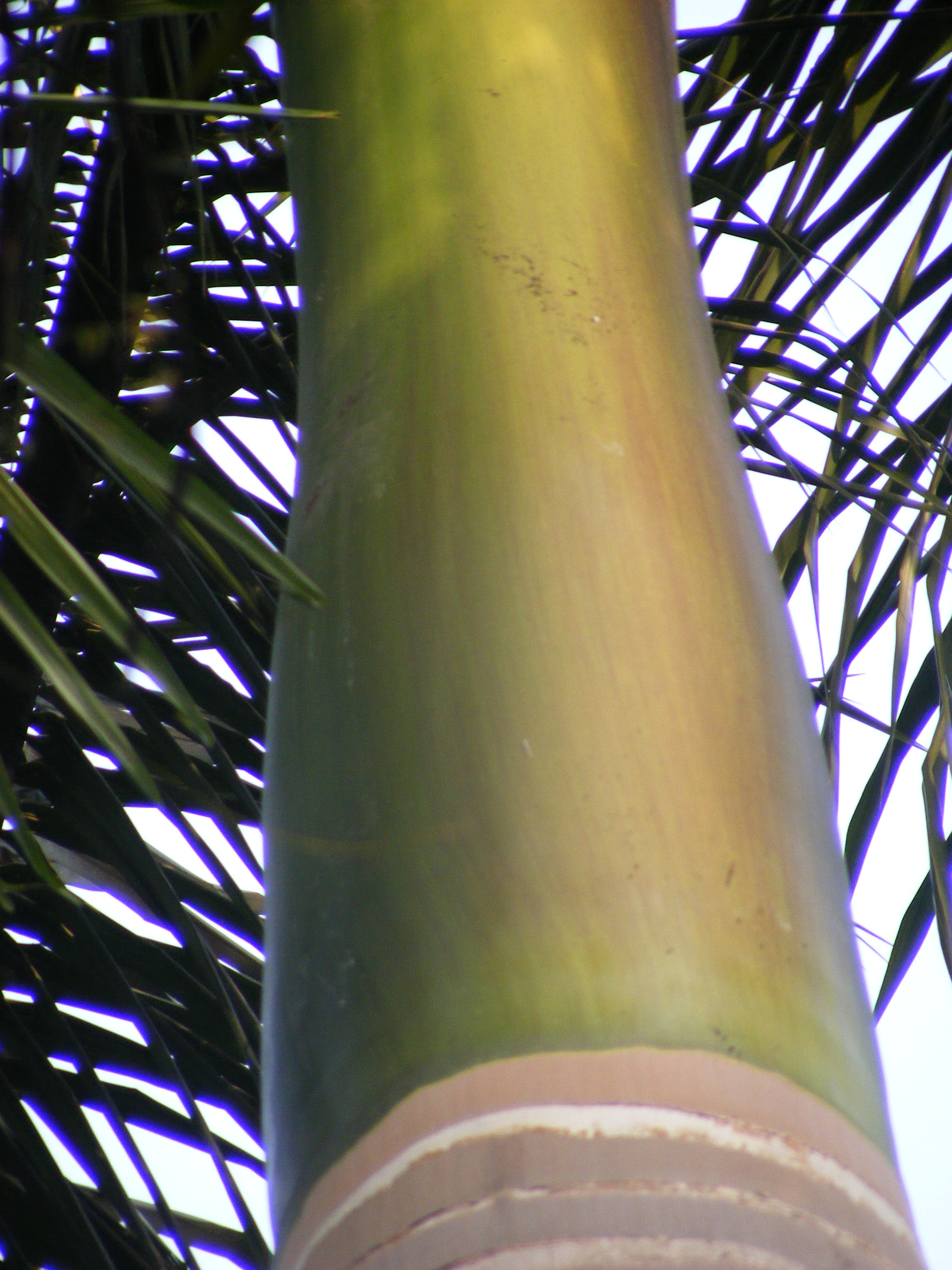
Close up of crown of Roystonea regia showing smooth tapering leaf sheath and fresh leaf scars, Kolkata, India

Roystonea leaves consist of a sheathing leaf base, a petiole, and a rachis. The leaf base forms a distinctive green sheath around the uppermost portion of the trunk. Known as the crownshaft, this sheath extends 1.4–2 metres (4 ft 7 in – 6 ft 7 in) down the trunk. The petiole connects the lead base with the rachis. The American botanist Scott Zona only reported petiole lengths for three of the 10 species, ranging from 20 to 100 centimetres (8 to 39 in). The rachis is pinnately divided and ranges from 3.2 to 5.8 m (10 to 19 ft) long. The leaf segments themselves range in length from 60 to 79 cm (24 to 31 in) in R. altissima up to as much as 132 cm (52 in) in R. lenis. They are arranged in two or three planes along the rachis. Many authors have reported that the leaves R. oleracea are arranged in a single plane, but Zona reported that this is not the case.

These plants have the ability to easily release their leaves in strong winds, a supposed adaption serving to prevent toppling during hurricanes. Inflorescences occur beneath the crownshaft, emerging from a narrow, horn-shaped bract. The flowers on the branched panicles are usually white, unisexual, and contain both sexes. The fruit is an oblong or globose drupe 1–2 centimetres (0.39–0.79 in) long and deep purple when ripe. Some species so closely resemble one another that scientific differentiation is by inflorescence detail; flower size, colour, etc.

== Taxonomy ==
Roystonea is placed in the subfamily Arecoideae and the tribe Roystoneae, which only contains Roystonea. The placement of Roystonea within the Arecoideae is uncertain; a phylogeny based on plastid DNA failed to resolve the position of the genus within the Arecoideae. As of 2008, there appear to be no molecular phylogenetic studies of Roystonea. One species is known only from two fossilized flowers preserved in Dominican amber which were described in 2002.

=== Species ===
Accepted species:

Image	Scientific name	Distribution
	Roystonea altissima (Mill.) H.E.Moore	Jamaica
	Roystonea borinquena O.F.Cook	United States (Puerto Rico), Hispaniola (Haiti and the Dominican Republic), Virgin Islands
	Roystonea dunlapiana P.H.Allen	Honduras, Nicaragua, Mexico (Chiapas, Tabasco, Veracruz, Yucatán Peninsula)
	Roystonea lenis León	Cuba
	Roystonea maisiana (L.H.Bailey) Zona	Cuba
	Roystonea oleracea (Jacq.) O.F.Cook	Venezuela, Colombia, Trinidad, Lesser Antilles; naturalized in Guyana, Mauritius and Réunion
	Roystonea princeps (Becc.) Burret	Jamaica
	Roystonea regia (Kunth) O.F.Cook	Mexico (Tabasco, Veracruz, Yucatán Peninsula), Belize, Honduras, United States (Florida), the Bahamas, Cayman Islands, Cuba, Hispaniola; naturalized in Puerto Rico, Panama, El Salvador, Leeward Islands
	Roystonea violacea León	Cuba
	† Roystonea palaea Poinar	Miocene, Hispaniola
	†Roystonea stellata León	Cuba, recently extinct

== Distribution ==
Roystonea has a circum-Caribbean distribution which ranges from southern Florida in the north, to southern Mexico, Honduras and Nicaragua in the east and Venezuela and Colombia in the south. Species are found throughout the Caribbean, although only Jamaica and Hispaniola (with two native species) and Cuba (with five native species) have more than one native species. A few species are planted in Tunisia as well.

== Uses ==
Royal palms are widely planted for decorative purposes throughout their native region, and elsewhere in the tropics and subtropics. Royal palms are very fond of water and thrive on supplemental irrigation. They also do better in a soil with much humus.

Though mainly a decorative plant, royal palms do have some minor agricultural uses. The heart of the palm is used to make salad in some parts of the Caribbean, and its seeds can be used as substitutes for coffee beans. Royal palm seeds were widely used in Cuba to feed pigs at least up to the 1940s and 1950s. The meat of pigs raised with royal palm seeds was said to be the very best. The lard obtained from pigs fattened or raised with royal palm seeds was said to exhibit a grainy texture, and by inference, to have been the best lard to consume. The seeds generally were obtained by men who specialized in climbing the royal palms using a set of two ropes looped around the stem, with two loops around the climber's legs to support himself. Once the climber reached the seed clumps, he would tie the clumps that were mature, cut them, and let them down by a rope supported from other seed clumps.
