= Roystonea lenis =

Conservation status
- Endangered (IUCN 3.1)

Scientific classification
- Kingdom: Plantae
- Clade: Tracheophytes
- Clade: Angiosperms
- Clade: Monocots
- Clade: Commelinids
- Order: Arecales
- Family: Arecaceae
- Genus: Roystonea
- Species: R. lenis

Binomial name
- Roystonea lenis León

Synonyms
- Roystonea regia var. pinguis L.H.Bailey

Species of palm

Roystonea lenis is a species of flowering plant in the palm family, Arecaceae. It is endemic to Guantánamo Province in eastern Cuba.

== Description ==
Roystonea lenis is a large palm which reaches heights of 20 metres (66 ft). Stems are grey-white and are usually 35–47 centimetres (14–19 in) in diameter. The upper portion of the stem is encircled by leaf sheaths, forming a green portion known as the crownshaft which is normally 2 m (6.6 ft) long. Individuals have about 15 leaves with 0.2–0.7 cm (0.079–0.276 in) petioles and 4–5.8-metre (13–19 ft) rachises; the leaves hang well horizontal. The 1 m (3.3 ft) inflorescences bear white male and female flowers. Fruit are 11.3–14 millimetres (0.44–0.55 in) long and 8.8–11.1 mm (0.35–0.44 in) wide, and black when ripe.
