= Roystonea violacea =

Conservation status
- Endangered (IUCN 3.1)

Scientific classification
- Kingdom: Plantae
- Clade: Tracheophytes
- Clade: Angiosperms
- Clade: Monocots
- Clade: Commelinids
- Order: Arecales
- Family: Arecaceae
- Genus: Roystonea
- Species: R. violacea

Binomial name
- Roystonea violacea León

Species of palm

Roystonea violacea is a species of flowering plant in the palm family, Arecaceae. It is endemic to the Maisí region of Guantánamo Province in eastern Cuba.

== Description ==
Roystonea violacea is a large palm which reaches heights of 15 metres (49 ft). Stems are mauve-brown to mauve-grey and are about 34 centimetres (13 in) in diameter. The upper portion of the stem is encircled by leaf sheaths, forming a green portion known as the crownshaft which is normally 2 m (6.6 ft) long. Individuals have about 15 leaves with 80 centimetres (31 in) petioles and 3.2–3.6-metre (10–12 ft) rachises; the leaves hang well horizontal. The 1.3 m (4.3 ft) inflorescences bear violet male and female flowers. Fruit are 12–13.7 millimetres (0.47–0.54 in) long and 7.8–8.5 mm (0.31–0.33 in) wide, and are brown to black when ripe.
