= Roystonea altissima =

Scientific classification
- Kingdom: Plantae
- Clade: Tracheophytes
- Clade: Angiosperms
- Clade: Monocots
- Clade: Commelinids
- Order: Arecales
- Family: Arecaceae
- Genus: Roystonea
- Species: R. altissima

Binomial name
- Roystonea altissima (Mill.) H.E.Moore

Synonyms
- Palma altissima Mill. Roystonea jamaicana L.H.Bailey

Species of palm

Roystonea altissima is a species of palm which is endemic to hillsides and mountain slopes near the interior of Jamaica. The name altissima is Latin for "highest", however they are not the tallest species in the genus Roystonea. They are usually found just over sea-level to 760 metres (2,490 ft) in elevation.

== Description ==
Roystonea altissima is a large palm which reaches heights of 20 metres (66 ft). Stems are grey-brown and range from 25.5–35 centimetres (10.0–13.8 in) in diameter. The upper portion of the stem is encircled by leaf sheaths, forming a green portion known as the crownshaft which is normally 1.4–1.6 m (4.6–5.2 ft) long. Individuals have about 15 leaves with 4-metre (13 ft) rachises; the leaves hang well horizontal. The 1.2 m (3.9 ft) inflorescences bear violet male and female flowers. Fruit are 11.4–15.3 millimetres (0.45–0.60 in) long and 7.2–10.4 mm (0.28–0.41 in) wide, and are black when ripe.

== Taxonomy ==
Roystonea is placed in the subfamily Arecoideae and the tribe Roystoneae. The placement Roystonea within the Arecoideae is uncertain; a phylogeny based on plastid DNA failed to resolve the position of the genus within the Arecoideae. As of 2008, there appear to be no molecular phylogenetic studies of Roystonea and the relationship between R. altissima and the rest of the genus is uncertain.

The species was first described by Scottish botanist Philip Miller as Palma altissima. The species was largely overlooked for the next 180 years until American botanist Liberty Hyde Bailey took a look at the royal palms as a whole. Apparently unaware of Miller's description, Bailey applied a new name, Roystonea jamaicana, to the species. In 1963 Harold E. Moore synonymised Bailey's species with Miller's and proposed a new combination, R. altissima.

=== Common names ===
Roystonea altissima is known as the "Jamaican cabbage tree", "Jamaican royal palm" or the "mountain cabbage palm".
