= Roystonea stellata =

Conservation status
- Extinct (1939) (IUCN 3.1)

Scientific classification
- Kingdom: Plantae
- Clade: Tracheophytes
- Clade: Angiosperms
- Clade: Monocots
- Clade: Commelinids
- Order: Arecales
- Family: Arecaceae
- Genus: Roystonea
- Species: †R. stellata

Binomial name
- †Roystonea stellata León

Extinct species of palm

Roystonea stellata is an extinct species of palm endemic to Yagruma terrace in the Maisí region of Guantánamo Province in eastern Cuba. The species is known from only a single collection made by French-born botanist Frère León in 1939.

== Description ==
Roystonea stellata was a large palm which reached heights of 15 metres (49 ft). The 95 cm (3.12 ft) inflorescences bears white male and female flowers. Fruit were 9.8–10.5 millimetres (0.39–0.41 in) long and 7.8–8.5 mm (0.31–0.33 in) wide, and black when ripe. The single known collection is not complete enough for a complete description.

== Status ==
No specimens have been found in repeated surveys of its habitat since the 1990s, and thus R. stellata is probably extinct.
