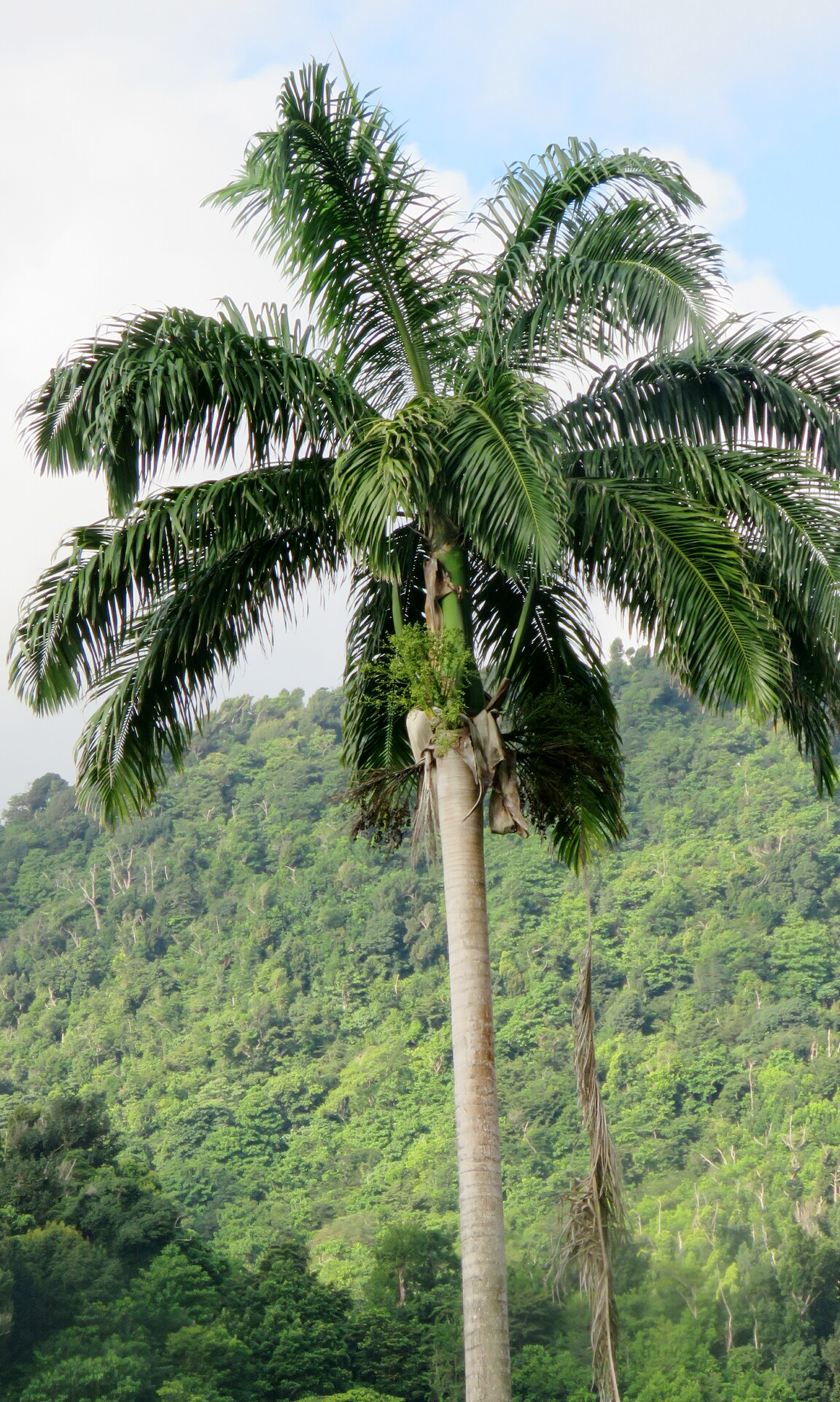
- Roystonea oleracea on Dominica

Conservation status
- Least Concern (IUCN 3.1)

Scientific classification
- Kingdom: Plantae
- Clade: Tracheophytes
- Clade: Angiosperms
- Clade: Monocots
- Clade: Commelinids
- Order: Arecales
- Family: Arecaceae
- Genus: Roystonea
- Species: R. oleracea

Binomial name
- Roystonea oleracea (Jacq.) O.F.Cook

Synonyms
- Areca oleracea Jacq. Oreodoxa oleracea (Jacq.) Mart. Kentia oleracea (Jacq.) Seem. ex H.Wendl. in O.C.E.de Kerchove de Denterghem; Gorgasia oleracea (Jacq.) O.F.Cook nom. inval. Euterpe caribaea Spreng. Oreodoxa caribaea (Spreng.) Dammer & Urb. in I.Urban; Roystonea caribaea (Spreng.) P.Wilson; Oreodoxa regia var. jenmanii Waby; Roystonea oleracea var. excelsior L.H.Bailey nom. illeg. Roystonea venezuelana L.H.Bailey; Roystonea oleracea var. jenmanii (Waby) Zona

= Roystonea oleracea =

Species of palm

Roystonea oleracea, sometimes known as the Caribbean royal palm, palmiste, imperial palm or cabbage palm, is a species of palm which is native to the Lesser Antilles, Colombia, Venezuela, and Trinidad and Tobago. It is also reportedly naturalized in Guyana and on the islands of Mauritius and Réunion in the Indian Ocean.

Its specific epithet oleracea means "vegetable/herbal" in Latin and is a form of holeraceus (oleraceus). The plant's buds was eaten in the West Indies.

== Description ==
Roystonea oleracea is a large palm which reaches heights of 40 metres (130 ft), with the record for a standing specimen being 38.7 metres (127 feet) not including the crownshaft or fronds; longer measurements have been claimed for felled specimens. Stems are grey or whitish-grey. and range from 46–66 centimetres (18–26 in) in diameter. The upper portion of the stem is encircled by leaf sheaths, forming a green portion known as the crownshaft which is normally about 2 m (6.6 ft) long. Individuals are reported to have 16–22 or 20–22 leaves. Leaves are once-pinnate and consist of a 60–100 cm (24–39 in) long petiole and a 4–4.6 m (13–15 ft) rachis. The leaflets are attached to the rachis at various angles, giving the frond a bottlebrush-like appearance. The 1.4 m (4.6 ft) inflorescence bears white male and female flowers. The fruit is 12.6–17.6 millimetres (0.50–0.69 in) long and 7.6–10.4 mm (0.30–0.41 in) wide, and turn purplish-black when ripe.

== Taxonomy ==
Roystonea is placed in the subfamily Arecoideae and the tribe Roystoneae. The placement Roystonea within the Arecoideae is uncertain; a phylogeny based on plastid DNA failed to resolve the position of the genus within the Arecoideae. As of 2008, there appear to be no molecular phylogenetic studies of Roystonea and the relationship between R. oleracea and the rest of the genus is uncertain.

The species was first described by Nikolaus von Jacquin in 1763 as Areca oleracea. The epithet oleracea means "vegetable- or herb-like", and is used in botanical Latin for edible or cultivated plants (as in Brassica oleracea or Portulaca oleracea). In 1838, Carl Friedrich Philipp von Martius transferred it to the genus Oreodoxa as O. oleracea. Berthold Carl Seemann transferred it to the genus Kentia in 1838. In 1900 Orator F. Cook proposed a new genus for the royal palms, and moved this species from Oreodoxa to Roystonea the following year.

In 1825 Curt Polycarp Joachim Sprengel described Euterpe caribaea, citing Jacquin's A. oleracea as a synonym. In 1903 Carl Lebrecht Udo Dammer and Ignatz Urban transferred this species to the genus Oreodoxa. Percy Wilson moved it to Roystonea in 1917. Since Sprengel was aware of Jacquin's description, his name is superfluous. Liberty Hyde Bailey described Roystonea venezuelana in 1949 based on a collection by Julian Steyermark. In his 1996 monograph on the genus Roystonea, Scott Zona reported that he was "unable to find any consistent morphological or molecular differences between the two taxa", and placed R. venezuelana in synonym with R. oleracea.

Based on cultivated plants at the botanical garden in Georgetown, Guyana (then British Guiana), John Frederick Waby described Oreodoxa regia var. jenmanii in 1919. The distinguishing feature of this variety was that it held its lowest leaves at a 45° angle above horizontal. In 1935 Bailey described R. oleracea var. excelsior based on specimens collected from the Georgetown Botanic Gardens. Hyde cited Waby's name as an unpublished synonym, apparently unaware that Waby's name was a valid, published name. In 1996 Zona coined a new combination, R. oleracea var. jenmannii to correct Hyde's mistake and update Waby's name. However, he noted that this variety, which was only known from cultivation, did not differ from the typical in floral or fruit characters. Rafaël Govaerts merged the variety into synonym with the typical variety.

=== Common names ===
Roystonea oleracea is known as the palmiste in Trinidad and Tobago, the royal palm or cabbage palm in Barbados and chaguaramo or maparó in Venezuela. In Colombia it is known as mapora in Spanish, mapórbot in Jitnu and mapoloboto in Sikuani. It is also called the cabbage tree, palmetto royal, palmier franc and chou palmiste, among other names.

== Distribution ==
Roystonea oleracea is native to Guadeloupe, Dominica and Martinique in the Lesser Antilles, Barbados, Trinidad and Tobago, northern Venezuela and northeastern Colombia. It is naturalised in Antigua, Guyana, Suriname and French Guiana. It often grows in areas subject which are wet for at least part of the year—coastal areas near the sea, gallery forests in seasonally flooded savannas.

== Ecology ==
Roystonea oleracea fruit is an important component of the diet of orange-winged amazon parrots and red-bellied macaws in Nariva Swamp, Trinidad and Tobago. Over the course of a study conducted between 1995 and 1996, R. oleracea fruit was an important element of the diet of both species between June and January, and was their dominant food item from July to November.

== Uses ==
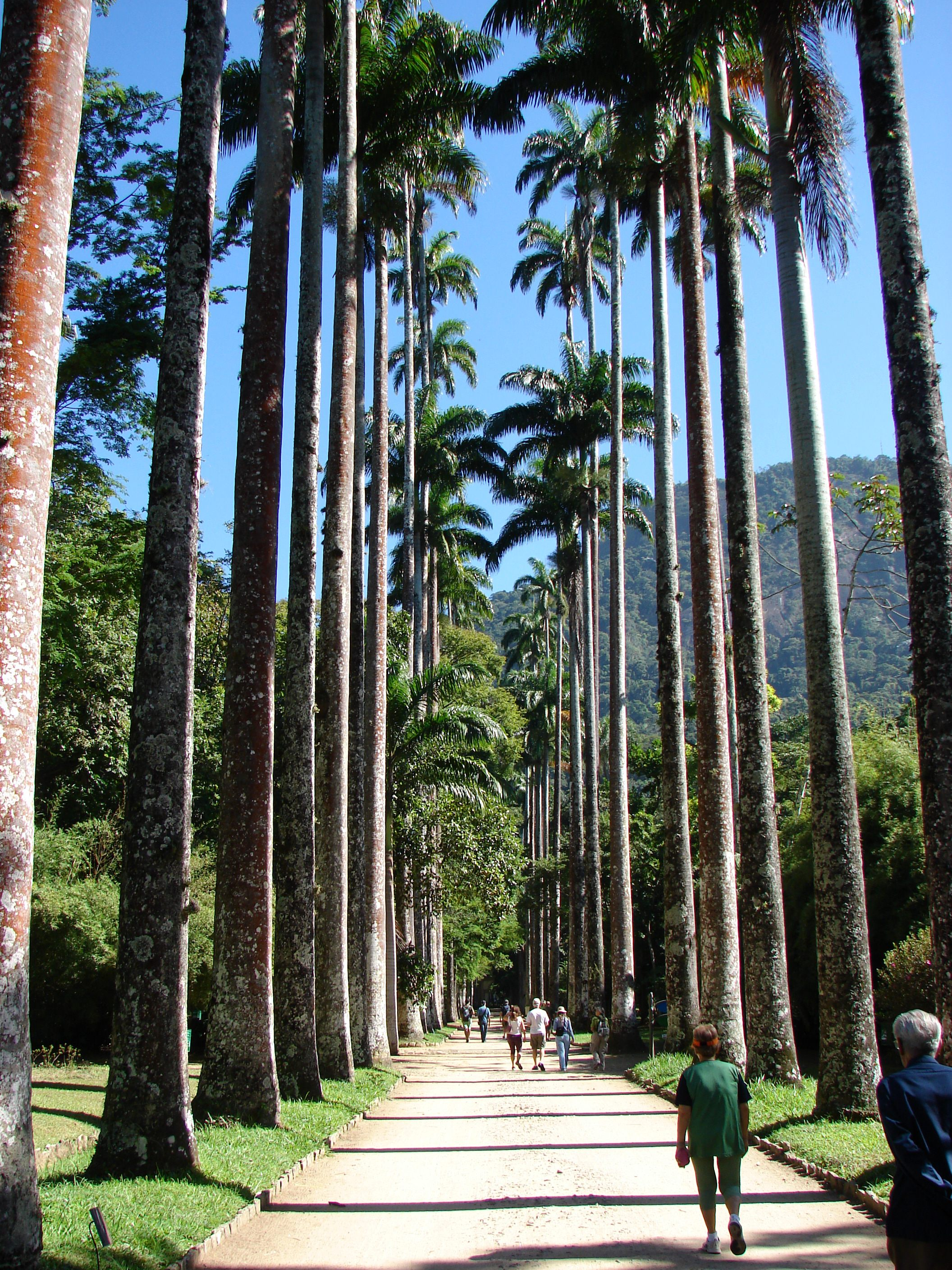
An avenue of Roystonea oleracea in the Botanical Garden of Rio de Janeiro, Rio de Janeiro, Brazil

The tallest and "most majestic" royal palm, Roystonea oleracea is often used as an ornamental tree. The wood can be used for construction. The terminal bud is edible. The sap of young inflorescences can be fermented to produce alcohol. In his 1750 Natural History of Barbados Griffith Hughes reported that the immature inflorescences could be pickled and eaten as a vegetable.
