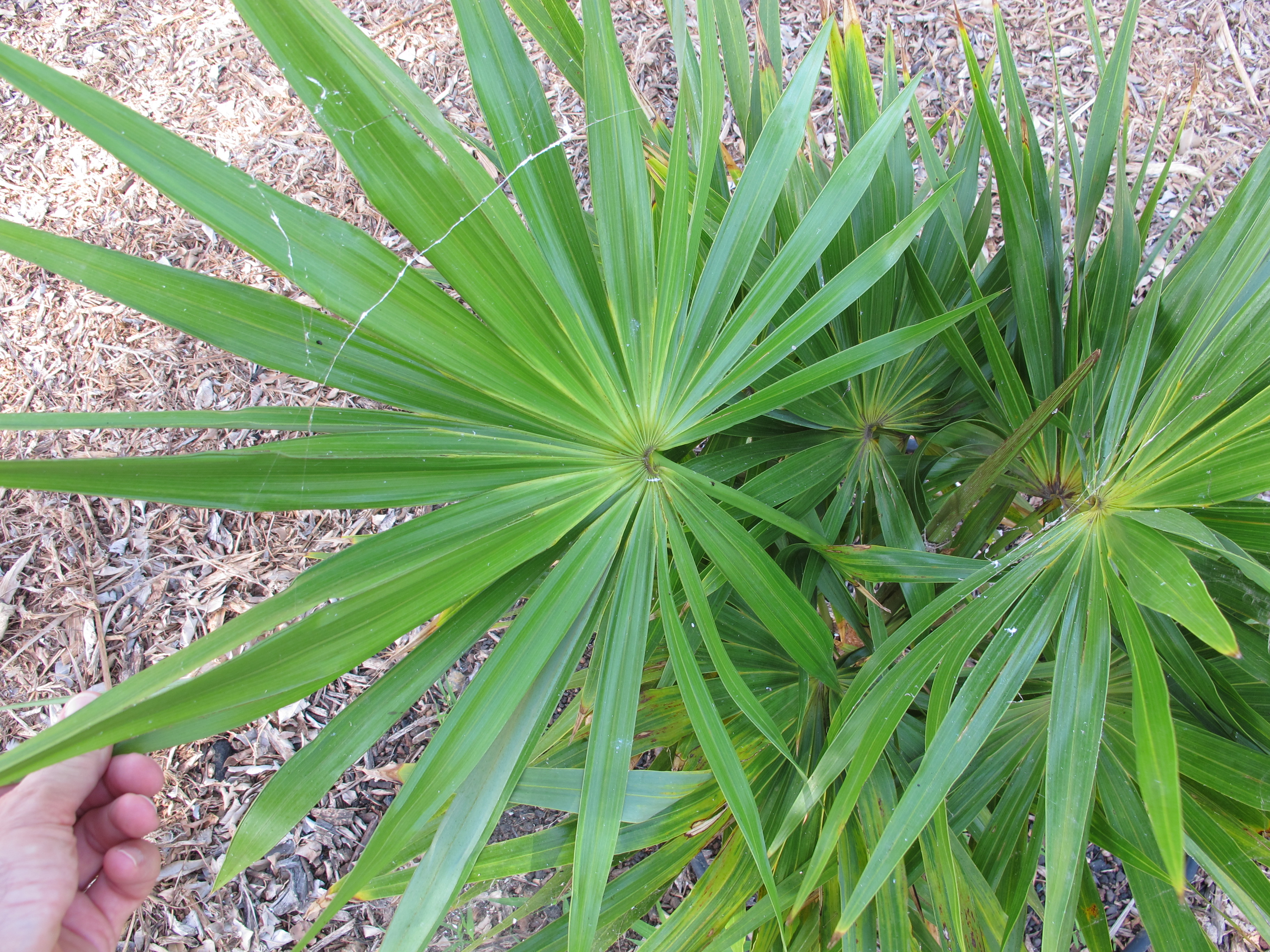

Scientific classification
- Kingdom: Plantae
- Clade: Tracheophytes
- Clade: Angiosperms
- Clade: Monocots
- Clade: Commelinids
- Order: Arecales
- Family: Arecaceae
- Genus: Hemithrinax
- Species: H. compacta

Binomial name
- Hemithrinax compacta (Griseb. & H.Wendl.) Hook.f. ex Salomon

Synonyms
- Hemithrinax compacta (Griseb. & H. Wendl.) Hook. f.; Thrinax compacta (Griseb. & H.Wendl.) Borhidi & O.Muñiz; Trithrinax compacta Griseb. & H.Wendl.

= Hemithrinax compacta =

Species of palm

Hemithrinax compacta is a species of flowering plant in the family Arecaceae. It is a palm that is endemic to Cuba.

== Distribution and habitat ==
Hemithrinax compacta flourishes on the mogotes of Cuba. Mogotes are dome-shaped hills in Cuba made up of coral rock. Hemithrinax compacta is the only species in its genus in Cuba that grows in the highlands, at an elevation of 450 metres (1,480 ft). Hemithrinax compacta needs to have more than 2,400 mm (94 in) per year of rainfall and a mean temperature of 22 degrees Celsius (72 °F).

== Description ==
The leaves of the palm have an average length of 190 cm (75 in) and the inflorescence of the palm is tightly clustered, giving rise to the species name. A mature H. compacta can have a massive trunk of up to 10 cm (3.9 in) thick and more than 20 m (66 ft) in height. The genus Thrinax has been grown in gardens. In addition, in Thrinax the fruits are dispersed and eaten by West Indian woodpeckers and other birds, gray squirrels and lizards.
