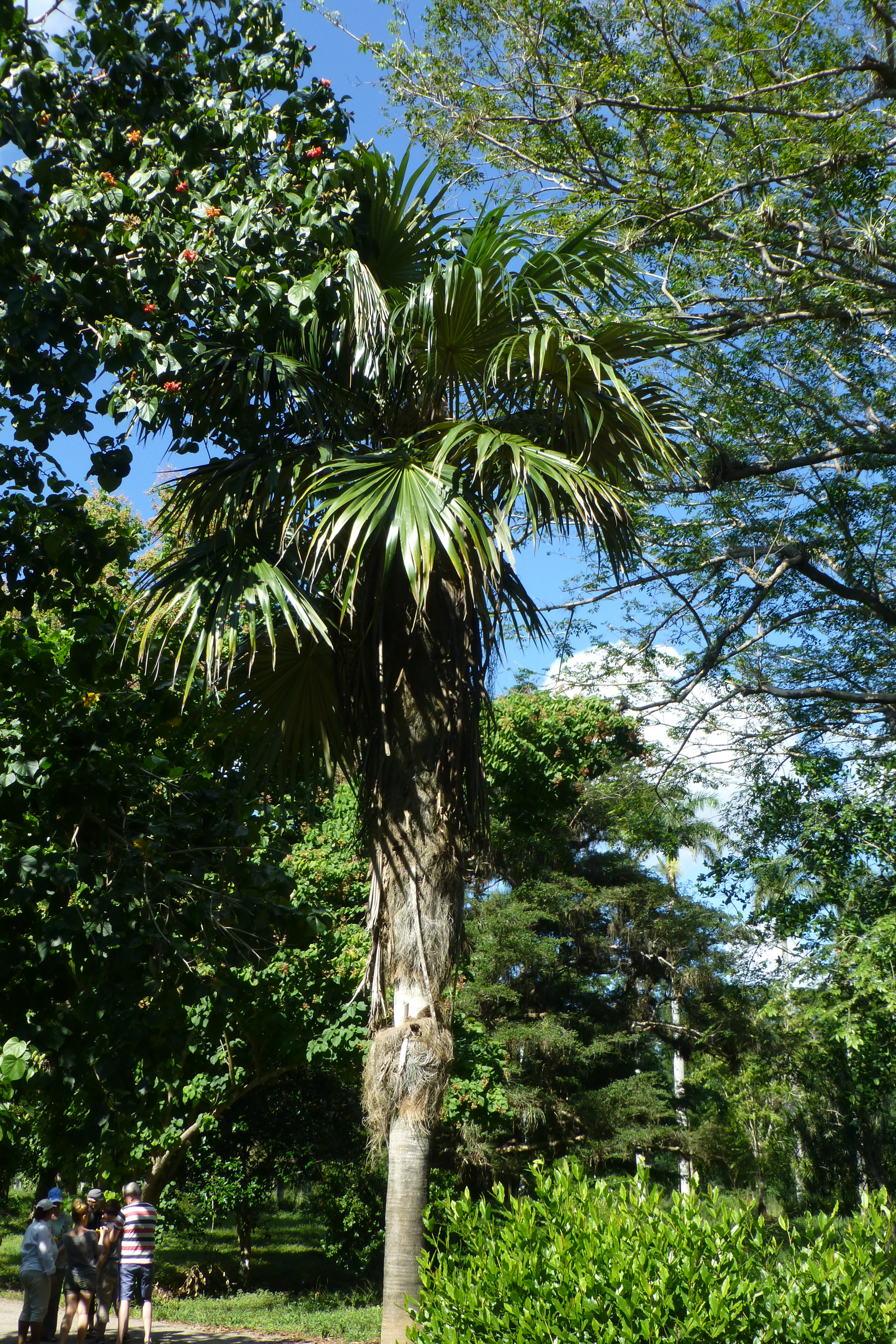
- Coccothrinax crinita cultivated in Cuba

Scientific classification
- Kingdom: Plantae
- Clade: Tracheophytes
- Clade: Angiosperms
- Clade: Monocots
- Clade: Commelinids
- Order: Arecales
- Family: Arecaceae
- Genus: Coccothrinax
- Species: C. crinita

Binomial name
- Coccothrinax crinita (Griseb. & H.Wendl. ex C.H.Wright) Becc.

= Coccothrinax crinita =

Species of palm

Coccothrinax crinita (guano barbudo, guano petate, old man palm, palma petate) is a palm which is endemic to Cuba. Like other members of the genus Coccothrinax, C. barbadensis is a fan palm (i.e. it has fan-shaped palmate leaves).

== Description ==
Like most palms, these trees are single-stemmed, between 2-10 metres tall with stems 8-20 centimetres in diameter. This tree appears wider because of the thatch or wool-like fibres on its trunk. This plant produces small, yellow dioecious flowers. These flowers tend to cluster on a long stalk that droops down from the canopy. After the flowers bloom and are pollinated, black and purple fruit develop. These are fleshy, 0.7–2 cm in diameter, and only harvest in the summer.

== Subspecies ==
Two subspecies are recognised: Coccothrinax crinita subsp. brevicrinis Borhidi & O.Muñiz and C. crinita subsp. crinita. The "short hair old man palm" (subsp. brevicrinis), has shorter and less dense leaf sheath fibres covering the trunk, it can be found in central Cuba.

== Ecology ==
Coccothrinax crinita usually grows in seasonally flooded savannas up to 500 m in size; occasionally in hilly areas. Also, it grows in moist and well-drained soils, preferably serpentine soils or soils with low nitrogen, potassium, and phosphorus. The main pollinator is the wind and fruits are dispersed by mammals like the Coccothrinax argentata species. The species is now critically endangered with only 60 – 130 trees left on the island of Cuba.

== Cultivation and uses ==
Coccothrinax crinita is frequently planted as an ornamental palm and the leaves are used for thatch. This tree is very easy to maintain and prefers growing in partial or full sunlight. It must have well drained, moist, non-clay soils, but it can tolerate basic soils, drought, and growing by the ocean. There are many uses for this palm, including using its fibres for pillows, the trunk for shelter, and the leaves for bowls. All of these uses have played a role in the rarity of this plant, as well as the destruction of its habitat.
