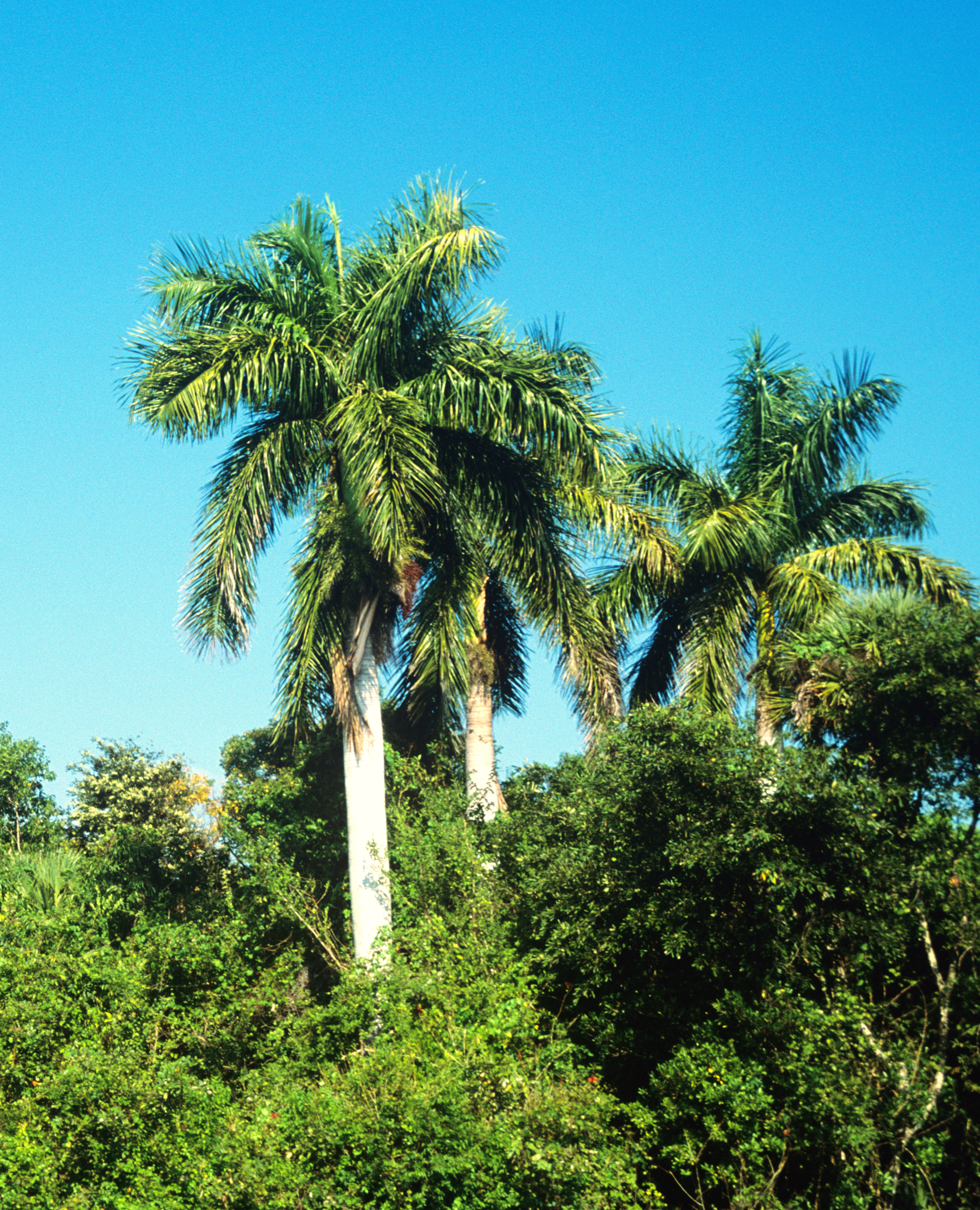
- Native habitat in Collier–Seminole State Park, Florida

Conservation status
- Least Concern (IUCN 3.1)

- Imperiled (NatureServe)

Scientific classification
- Kingdom: Plantae
- Clade: Tracheophytes
- Clade: Angiosperms
- Clade: Monocots
- Clade: Commelinids
- Order: Arecales
- Family: Arecaceae
- Genus: Roystonea
- Species: R. regia

Binomial name
- Roystonea regia (Kunth) O.F.Cook
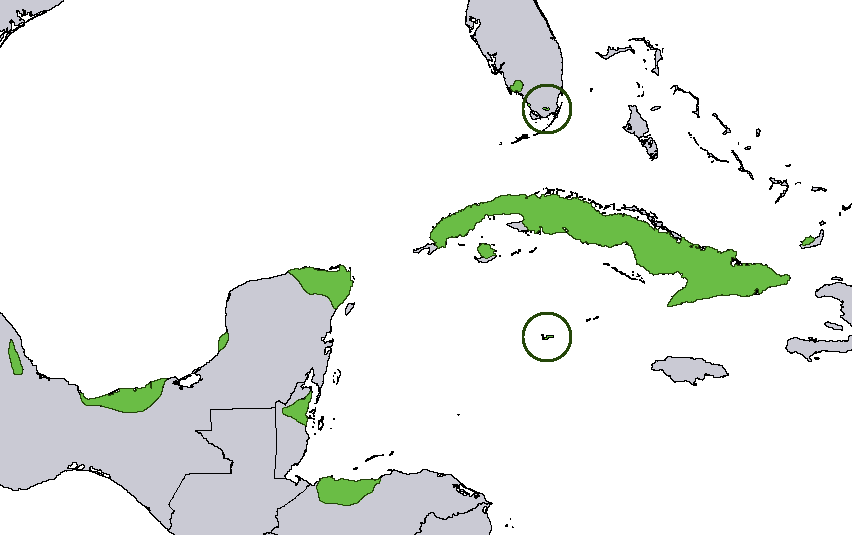
- Natural range of Roystonea regia

Synonyms
- Oreodoxa regia Kunth; Oenocarpus regius (Kunth) Spreng. Palma elata W.Bartram; Roystonea floridana O.F.Cook; Euterpe jenmanii C.H.Wright; Euterpe ventricosa C.H.Wright; Roystonea jenmanii (C.H.Wright) Burret; Roystonea elata (W.Bartram) F.Harper; Roystonea ventricosa (C.H.Wright) L.H.Bailey; Roystonea regia var. hondurensis P.H.Allen

= Roystonea regia =

Royal palm

Species of palm

Roystonea regia, commonly known as the royal palm, Cuban royal palm, or Florida royal palm, is a species of palm native to Mexico, the Caribbean, Florida, and parts of Central America. A large and attractive palm, it has been planted throughout the tropics and subtropics as an ornamental tree. Although it is sometimes called R. elata, the conserved name R. regia is now the correct name for the species. The royal palm reaches heights from 15–24 m (50–80 ft) tall. Populations in Cuba and Florida were long seen as separate species, but are now considered a single species.

Widely planted as an ornamental, R. regia is also used for thatch, construction timber, and in some forms of traditional medicine. The fruit is eaten by birds and bats (which disperse the seeds) and fed to livestock. Its flowers are visited by birds and bats, and it serves as a roosting site and food source for a variety of animals. Roystonea regia is the national tree of Cuba, and has a religious role both in Santería and Christianity, where it is used in Palm Sunday observances.

== Description ==
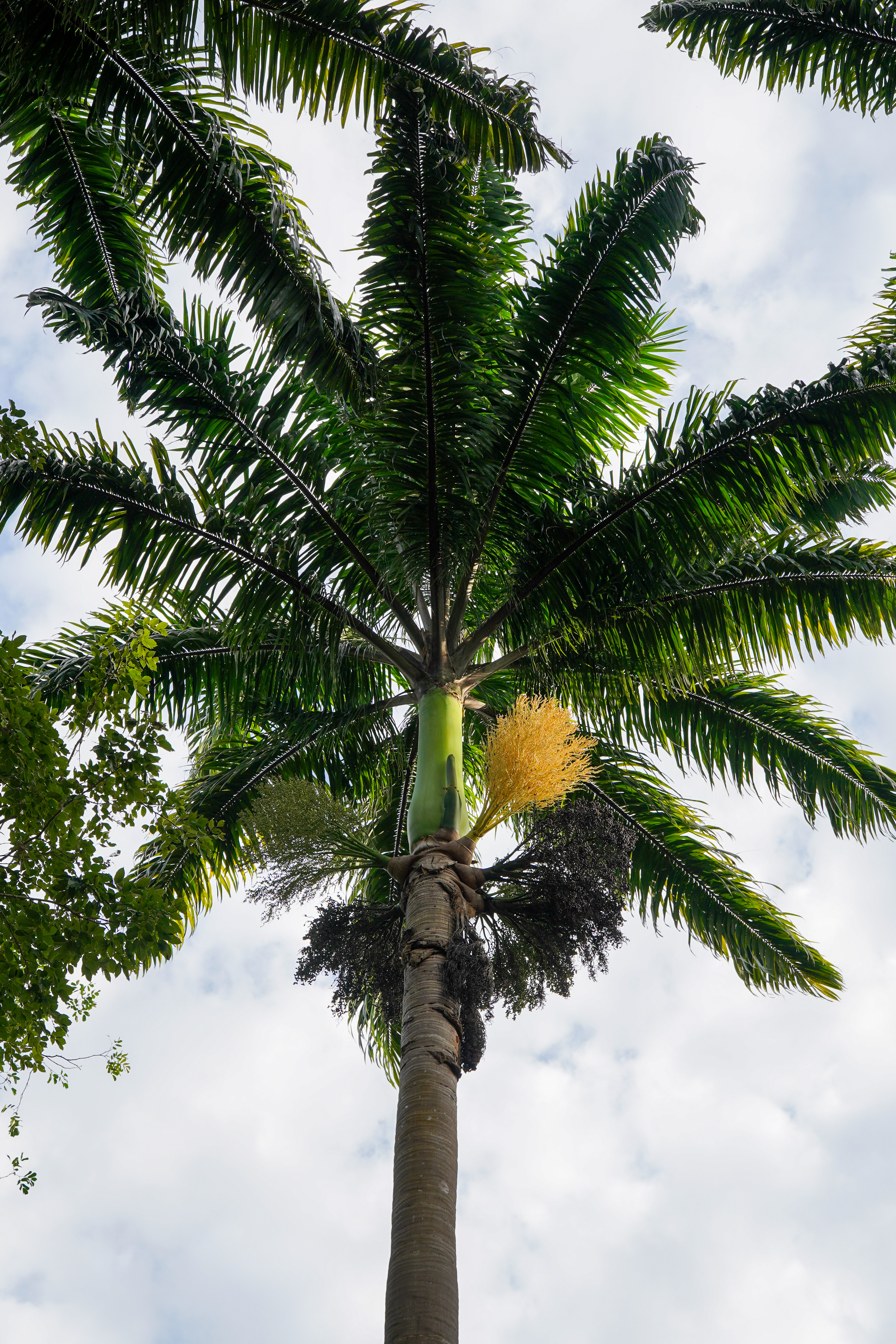
Crown with immature and mature fruit

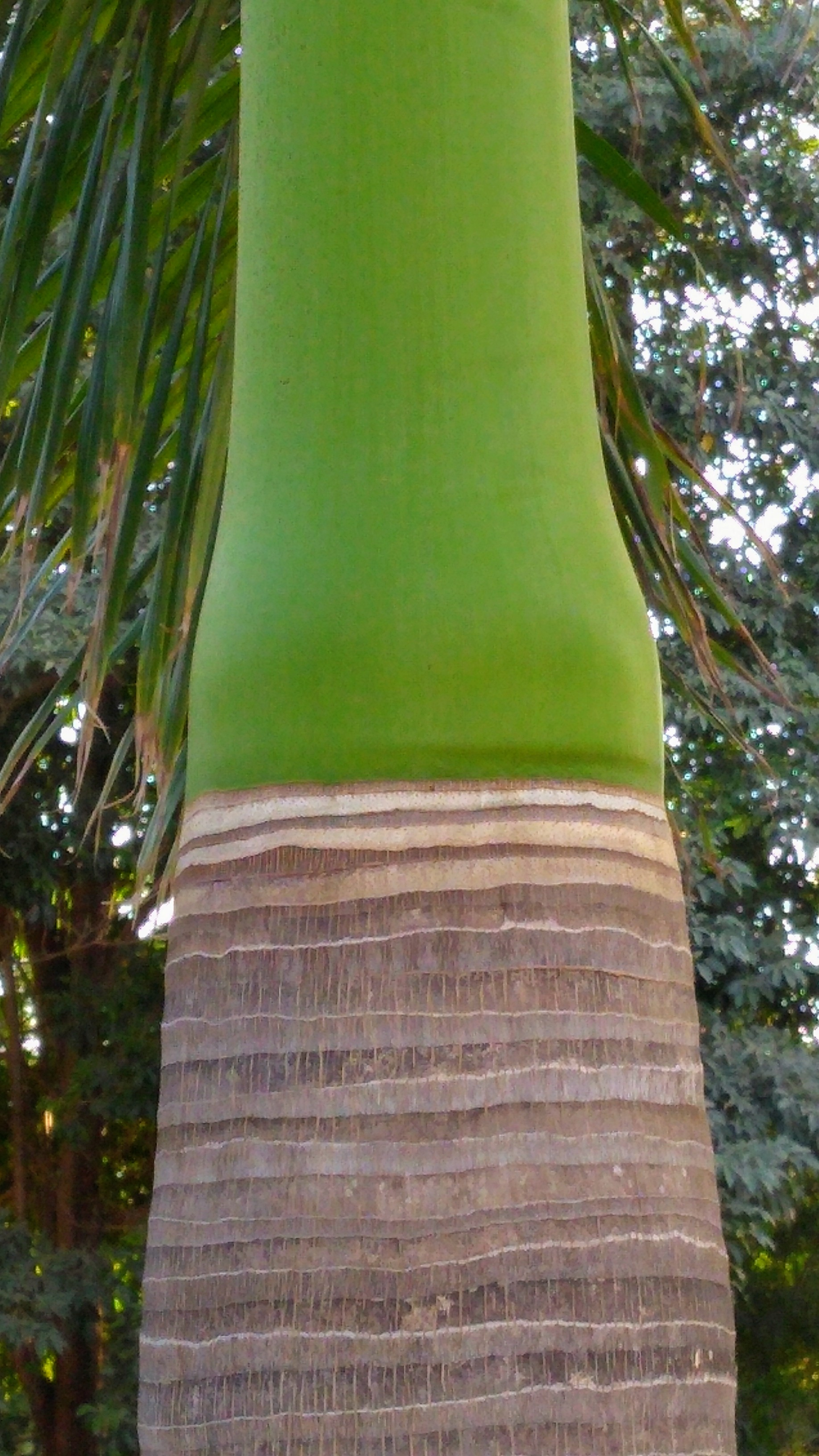
The distinctive smooth crownshaft and rows of circular leaf scars are clearly visible.

Roystonea regia is a large palm which reaches a height of 20–30 metres (66–98 ft) tall, (with heights up to 34.5 m (113 ft) reported) and a stem diameter of about 47 centimetres (19 in). (K. F. Connor reports a maximum stem diameter of 61 cm (24 in).) The trunk is stout, very smooth and grey-white in colour with a characteristic bulge below a distinctive green crownshaft. Trees have about 15 leaves which can be up to 4 m (13 ft) long. The flowers are white with pinkish anthers. The fruit are spheroid to ellipsoid in shape, 8.9–15 millimetres (0.35–0.59 in) long and 7–10.9 mm (0.28–0.43 in) wide. They are green when immature, turning red and eventually purplish-black as they mature.

Root nodules containing Rhizobium bacteria have been found on R. regia trees in India. The presence of rhizobia-containing root nodules is usually associated with nitrogen fixation in legumes; this was the first record of root nodules in a monocotyledonous tree. Further evidence of nitrogen fixation was provided by the presence of nitrogenase (an enzyme used in nitrogen fixation) and leghaemoglobin, a compound which allows nitrogenase to function by reducing the oxygen concentration in the root nodule. In addition to evidence of nitrogen fixation, the nodules were also found to be producing indole acetic acid, an important plant hormone.

== Taxonomy ==
Roystonea is placed in the subfamily Arecoideae and the tribe Roystoneae. The placement Roystonea within the Arecoideae is uncertain; a phylogeny based on plastid DNA failed to resolve the position of the genus within the Arecoideae. As of 2008, there appear to be no molecular phylogenetic studies of Roystonea and the relationship between R. regia and the rest of the genus is uncertain.

The species was first described by American naturalist William Bartram in 1791 as Palma elata based on trees growing in central Florida. In 1816 German botanist Carl Sigismund Kunth described the species Oreodoxa regia based on collections made by Alexander von Humboldt and Aimé Bonpland in Cuba. In 1825 German botanist Curt Polycarp Joachim Sprengel moved it to the genus Oenocarpus and renamed it O. regius.

The genus Oreodoxa was proposed by German botanist Carl Ludwig Willdenow in 1807 and applied by him to two species, O. acuminata (now known as Prestoea acuminata) and O. praemorsa (now Wettinia praemorsa). Although these species were transferred to other genera, the genus Oreodoxa continued to be applied to a variety of superficially similar species which were not, in fact, closely related. To address this problem, American botanist Orator F. Cook created the genus Roystonea, which he named in honour of American general Roy Stone, and renamed Kunth's species Roystonea regia.

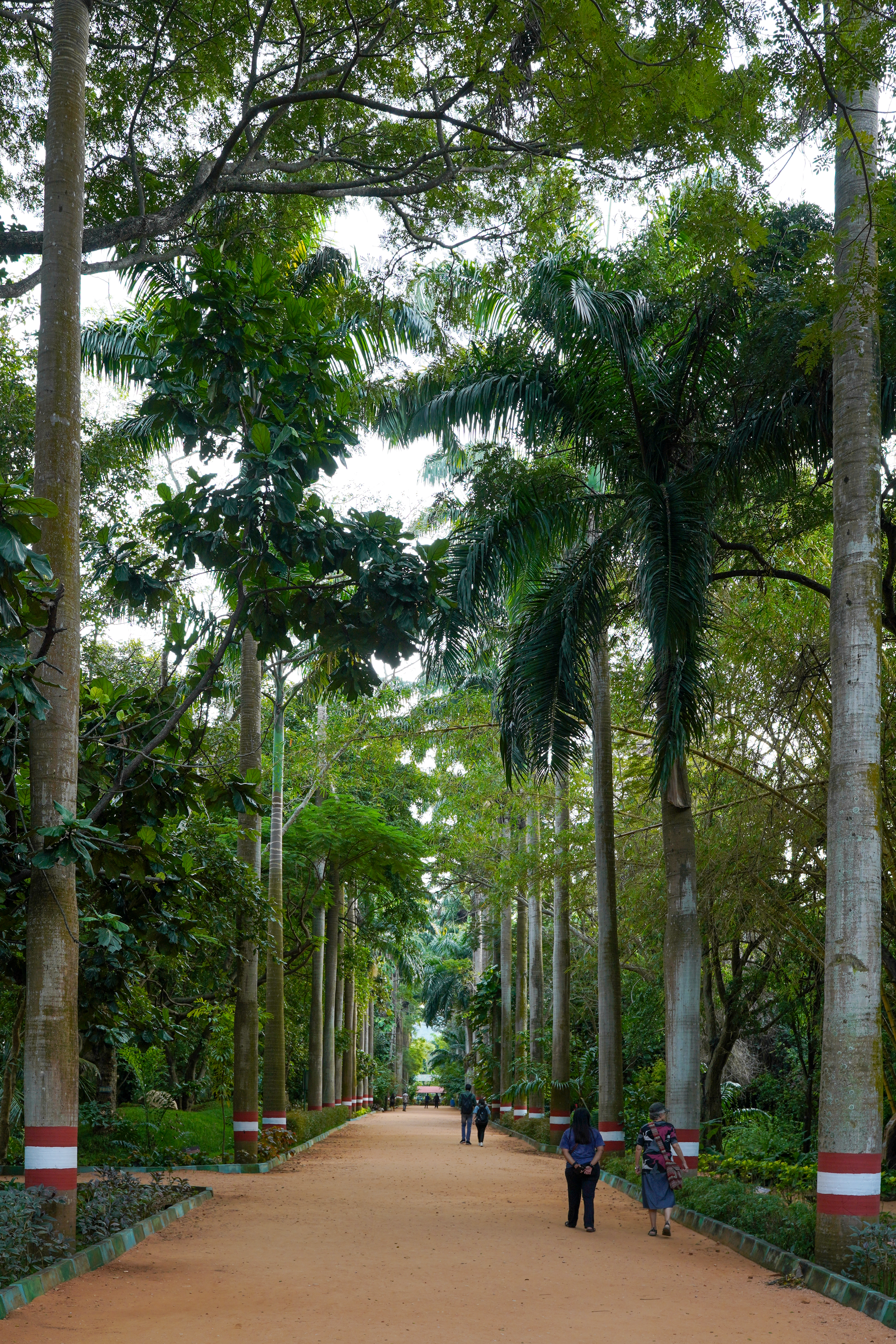
Avenue in Mysore, India

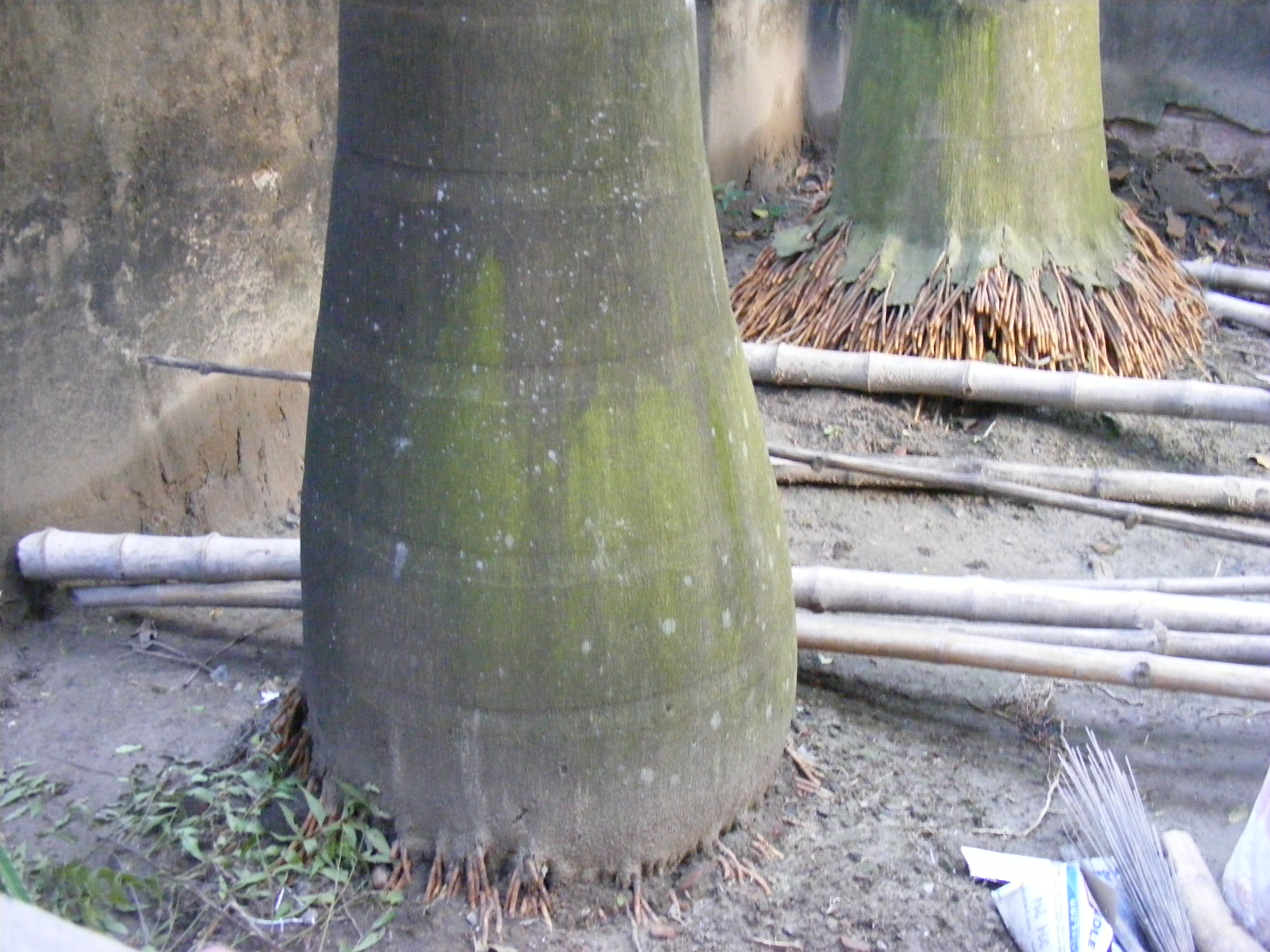
Stem base of two individuals in Kolkata, India showing fibrous roots typical of monocots

Cook considered Floridian populations to be distinct from both the Cuba R. regia and the Puerto Rican R. borinquena, and he placed them in a new species, R. floridana, which is now considered a synonym of R. regia. In 1906 Charles Henry Wright described two new species based on collections from Georgetown, British Guiana (now Guyana) which he placed in the genus Euterpe—E. jenmanii and E. ventricosa. Both species are now considered synonyms of R. regia. The name R. regia var. hondurensis was applied by Paul H. Allen to Central American populations of the species. However, Scott Zona determined that they did not differ enough from Cuban populations to be considered a separate variety.

Based on the rules of botanical nomenclature, the oldest properly published name for a species has priority over newer names. Bartram applied the Linnaean binomial Palma elata to a "large, solitary palm with an ashen white trunk topped by a green leaf sheath [the crownshaft] and pinnate leaves" growing in central Florida. While no type collection is known, there are no other native palms that would fit Bartram's description. In 1946 Francis Harper pointed out that Bartram's name was valid and proposed a new combination, Roystonea elata. Liberty Hyde Bailey's use of the name in his 1949 revision of the genus, established its usage.

Harper's new combination immediately supplanted Cook's R. floridana, but there was disagreement as to whether Cuban and Floridian populations represented a single species or two species. Zona's revision of the genus concluded that they both belonged to the same species. According to the rules of botanical nomenclature, the correct name of the species should have been Roystonea elata. Zona pointed out, however, that the name R. regia (or Oreodoxa regia) has a history of use in horticulture that dated from at least 1838, and that the species had been propagated around the world under that name. Roystonea elata, on the other hand, had only been used since 1949, and was used much less widely. On that basis, Zona proposed that the name Roystonea regia should be conserved.

=== Common names ===
In cultivation, Roystonea regia is called the Cuban royal palm or simply the royal palm. In Cuba, the tree is called the palma real or palma criolla. In India, where it is widely cultivated, it is called vakka. In Cambodia, where it is planted as decorative along avenues and in public parks, it is known as sla barang' ("Western palm").

== Reproduction and growth ==
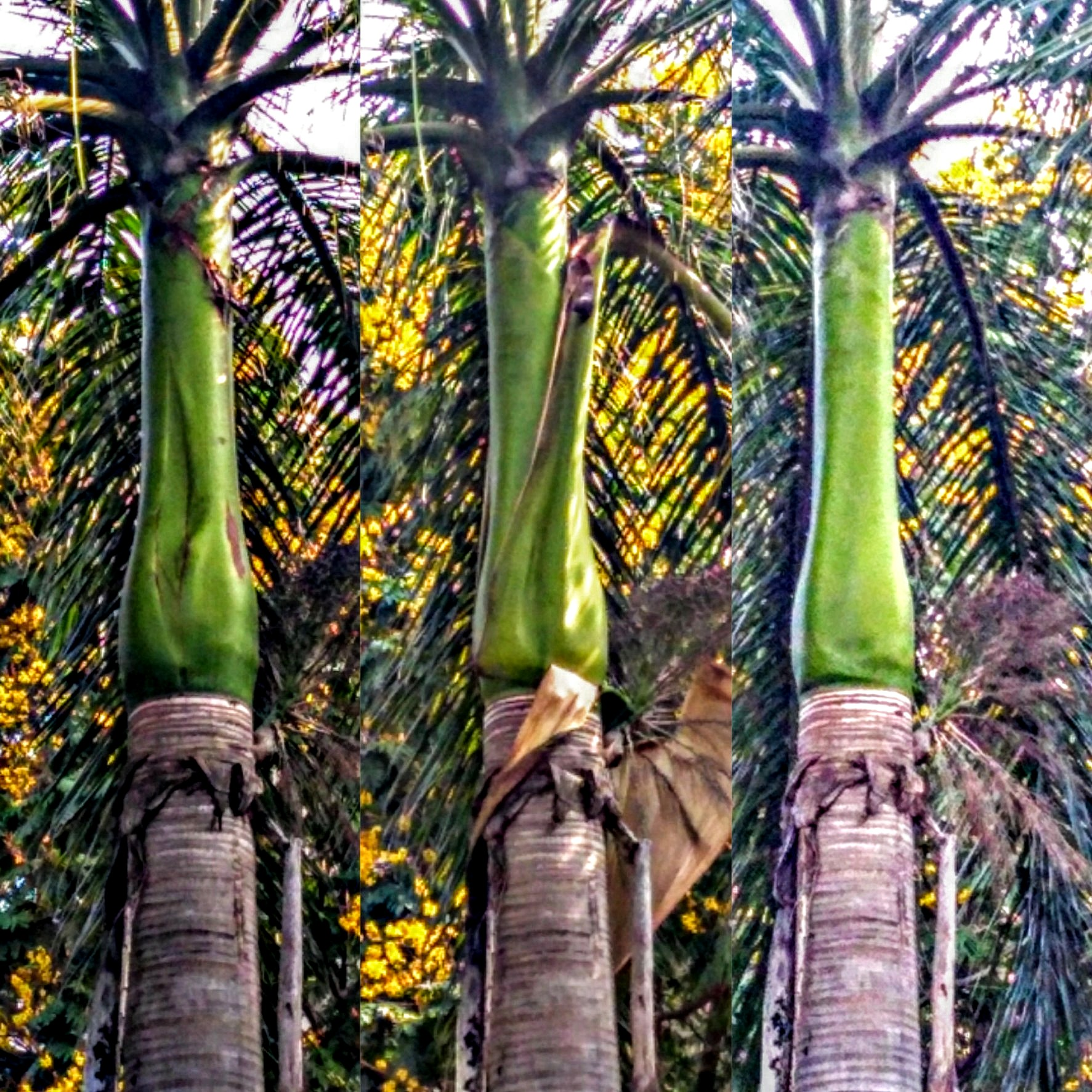
Shedding of leaf in royal palm

Roystonea regia produces unisexual flowers that are pollinated by animals. European honey bees and bats are reported pollinators. Seeds are dispersed by birds and bats that feed upon the fruit.

Seed germination is adjacent ligular—during germination, as the cotyledon expands it only pushes a portion of the embryo out of the seed. As a result, the seedling develops adjacent to the seed. The embryo forms a ligule, and the plumule protrudes from this. Seedlings in cultivation are reported to begin producing a stem two years after germination, at the point where they produce their thirteenth leaf. Growth rates of seedlings averaged 4.2 cm (1.7 in) per year in Florida.

== Distribution and habitat ==
Roystonea regia is found in Central America, Cuba, the Cayman Islands, Hispaniola (the Dominican Republic and Haiti), the Lesser Antilles, The Bahamas, southern Florida, and Mexico (in Veracruz, Campeche, Quintana Roo, and Yucatán). William Bartram described the species from Lake Dexter, along the St. Johns River in the area of modern Lake and Volusia Counties in central Florida, an area north of its modern range, suggesting a wider distribution in the past.

Roystonea regia is most abundant in Cuba, where is occurs on hillsides and valleys. In southern Florida, Roystonea regia occurs in strand swamps and hardwood hammocks. Royal Palm State Park in the Everglades was established due to the high concentration of the species.

Roystonea is cultivated in tropical and subtropical climates in the United States, Australia, Brazil, and parts of southern Asia as a landscape palm. It appears to naturalise with ease, and extensive naturalised populations are present in Panama, Costa Rica, and Guyana. In the United States it grows mostly in central and southern Florida, Hawaii, Puerto Rico, and in South Texas in the Rio Grande Valley and southern California.

== Ecology ==
The leaves of Roystonea regia are used as roosting sites by Eumops floridanus, the Florida bonneted bat, and is used as a retreat for Cuban tree frogs (Osteopilus septentriolalis), a non-native species in Florida. In Panama (where R. regia is introduced), its trunks are used as nesting sites by yellow-crowned parrots (Amazona ochrocephala panamensis). The flowers of R. regia are visited by pollen-collecting bees and are considered a good source of nectar. Its pollen was also found in the stomachs of Phyllonycteris poeyi, the Cuban flower bat (a pollen-feeder) and Monophyllus redmani, Leach's single leaf bat (a nectar-feeder). Artibeus jamaicensis, the Jamaican fruit bat, and Myiozetetes similis, the social flycatcher, feed on the fruit.

Roystonea regia is the host plant for the royal palm bug, Xylastodoris luteolus, in Florida. It also serves as a larval host plant for the butterflies Pyrrhocalles antiqua orientis and Asbolis capucinus in Cuba, and Brassolis astyra and B. sophorae in Brazil. It is susceptible to bud rot caused by the oomycete Phytophthora palmivora and by the fungus Thielaviopsis paradoxa.

The species is considered an invasive species in secondary forest in Panama.

== Uses ==
Roystonea regia has been planted throughout the tropics and subtropics as an ornamental. The seed is used as a source of oil and for livestock feed. Leaves are used for thatching and the wood for construction. The roots are used as a diuretic, and for that reason they are added to tifey, a Haitian drink, by Cubans of Haitian origin. They are also used as a treatment for diabetes.

Fibres extracted from the leaf sheath of R. regia have been found to be comparable with sisal and banana fibres, but lower in density, making it a potentially useful source for the use in lightweight composite materials. An extract from R. regia fruit known as D-004 reduces benign prostate hyperplasia (BPH) in rodents. D-004, is a mixture of fatty acids, is being studied as a potential alternative to finasteride for the treatment of BPH.

=== Religious significance ===
Roystonea regia plays an important role in popular religion in Cuba. In Santería it is associated primarily with Shango or with his father Aggayú. It also has symbolic importance in the Palo faiths and the Abakuá fraternity. In Roman Catholicism, R. regia plays an important role in Palm Sunday observances.
