= Scott Zona =

- Born: US
- Education: Rancho Santa Ana Botanic Garden & Claremont Graduate University
- Known for: Botany; Taxonomy; Palm natural history Bryophytes
- Scientific career
- Doctoral advisor: Sherwin Carlquist
- Author abbrev. (botany): Zona

Scott Zona (born 1959) is an American botanist. From 1993 to 2008, he was the Palm Biologist at Fairchild Tropical Botanic Garden. From 2008 to 2017, he served as the curator for the Florida International University Wertheim Conservatory. He is noted for his study of palms and is co-editor for Palms, the journal of the International Palm Society.

He has done botanical research in the Western Pacific, Caribbean, Central America, South America, Madagascar, Malesia and the continental United States and published over 175 scientific and popular articles. He was honored with the Jesse M. Greenman Award in 1991 for his monograph of Sabal.

In late 2022, his book, A Gardener's Guide to Botany, was published by Cool Springs Press, an imprint of the Quarto Group. The book won an American Horticultural Society Book Award in 2023.

A palm from New Guinea, Orania zonae A.P.Keim & J.Dransf., was named in his honor in 2012.
