= Crownshaft =

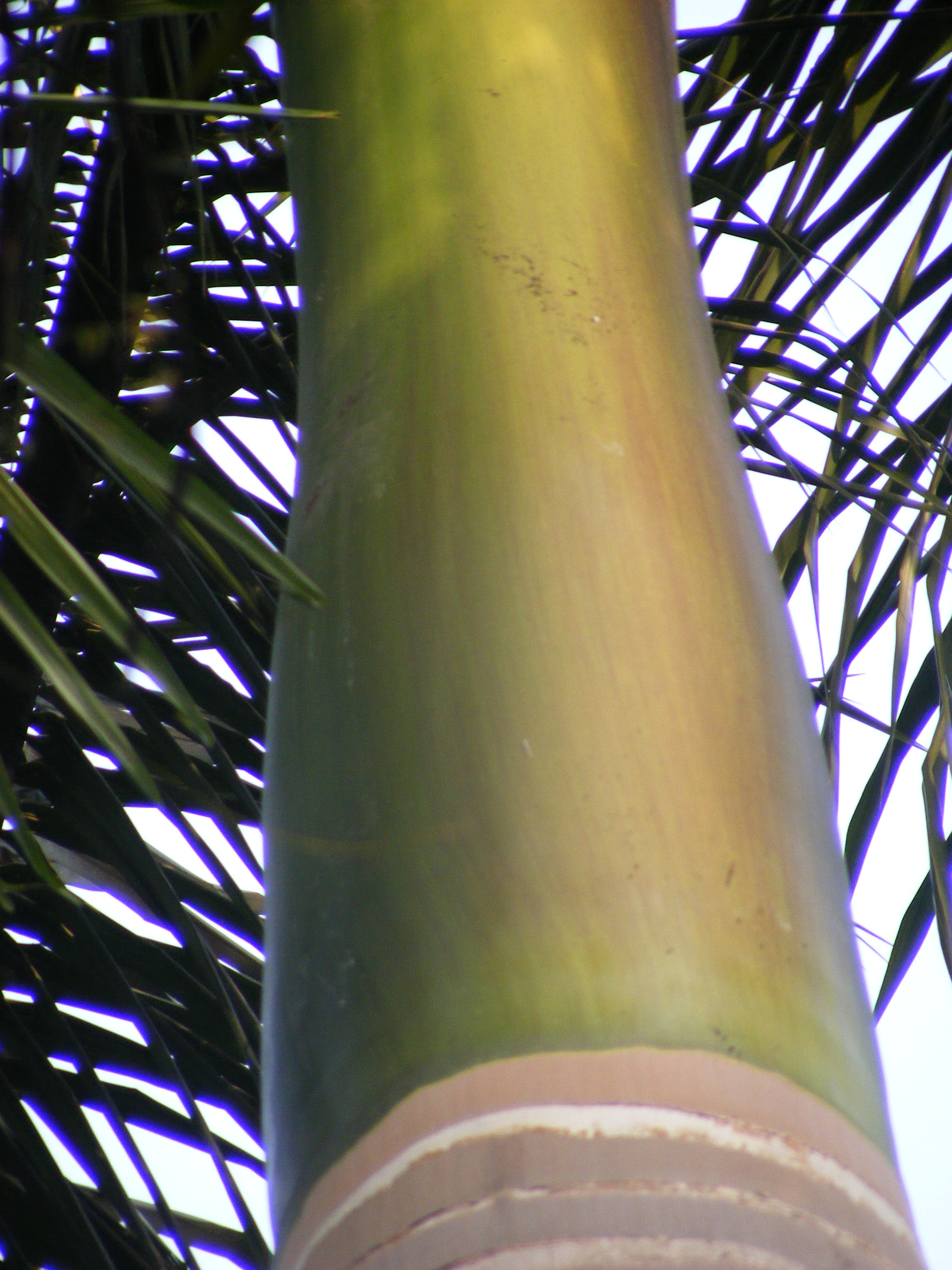
Close up of crownshaft of Roystonea regia showing smooth tapering leaf sheath and fresh leaf scars, Kolkata, India

An elongated circumferential leaf base formation present on some species of palm is called a crownshaft.

The leaf bases of some pinnate leaved palms (most notable being Roystonea regia or the royal palm but also including the genera Areca, Wodyetia and Pinanga) form a sheath at the top of the trunk surrounding the bud where all the subsequent leaves are formed.

The crownshaft takes the form of a column above the main trunk and beneath the main crown of leaves and is nothing but the collection of the leaf bases of the plant, all tightly wrapped around one another. It is usually green in color but may be a different color from that of the leaves themselves, including white, blue, red, brownish or orange. Each layer of the crownshaft is a distinct leaf base and is usually made of a tough fibrous material with a feel similar to leather and in many parts of the world, it is cured and used to prepare covers, sheets and roofing material. The leaf base of some palms is also used to extract coir.

The oldest leaf forms the outermost layer of the crownshaft. Eventually the lowest palm frond dies back, the outer layer of the crownshaft splits, the leaf unwraps and pulls away from the trunk exposing the new crownshaft surface. In time the old leaf separates at the base and falls away leaving the distinct rings and ridges of the leafbase scars seen on the trunks of many species of palm. These scars usually fade over time and the distance between two successive scars is an approximate indicator of the speed of growth of the palm. In tropical conditions when growing conditions are good, the palm grows faster and the gap between scars is large; conversely when growing conditions are not optimum, plant growth is slow and the gaps are narrower. Juveniles and younger palms usually grow faster than adults; this is demonstrated by the larger gaps between scars at the base as compared to the top.

In some species of palm the shaft is fairly indistinct because the leaf bases are not wrapped around each other very tightly, and the shaft becomes extended and “loose.”

Some palm species do not form a shaft until past the juvenile stage.

== Gallery ==
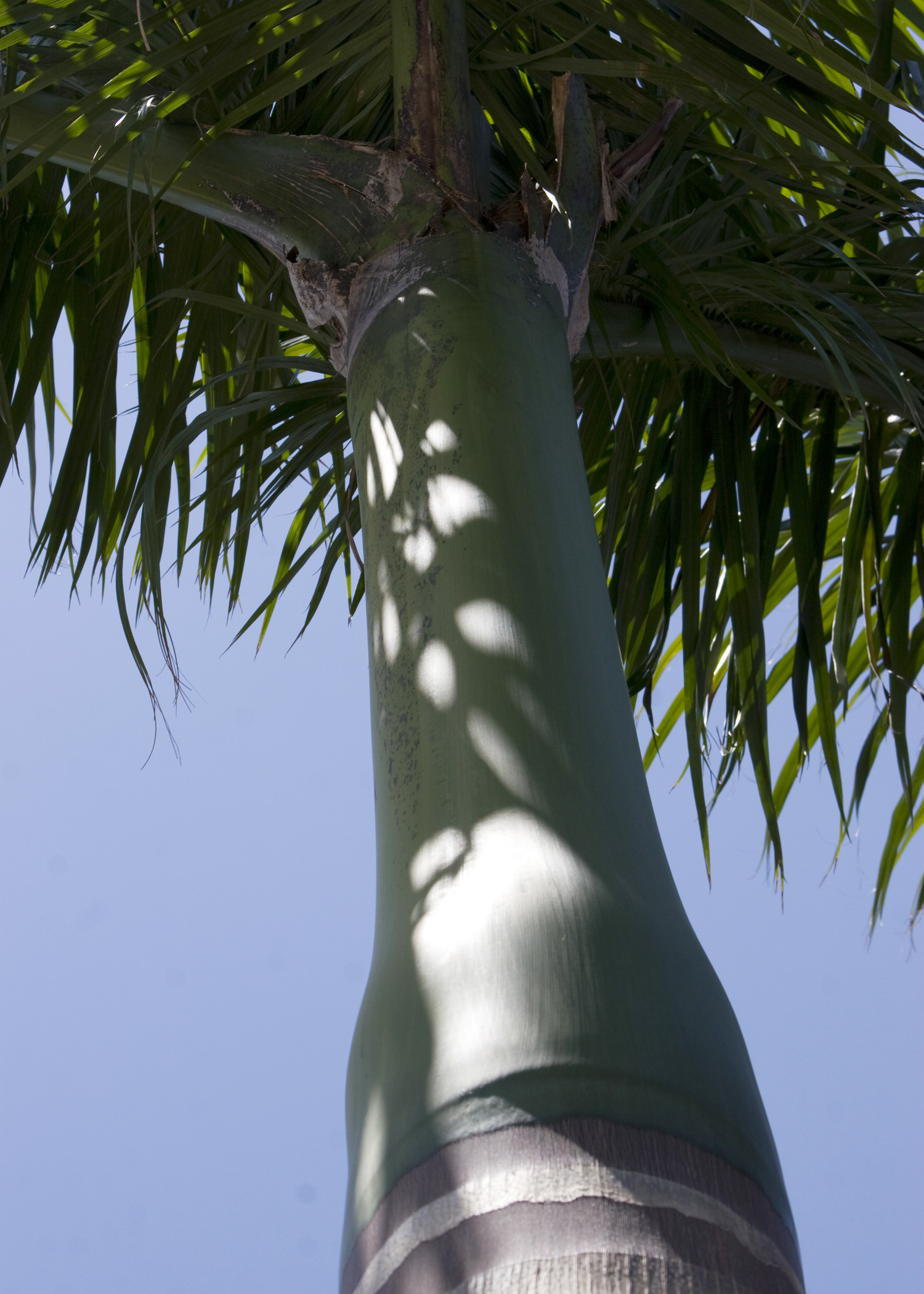
Crownshaft on a mature royal palm

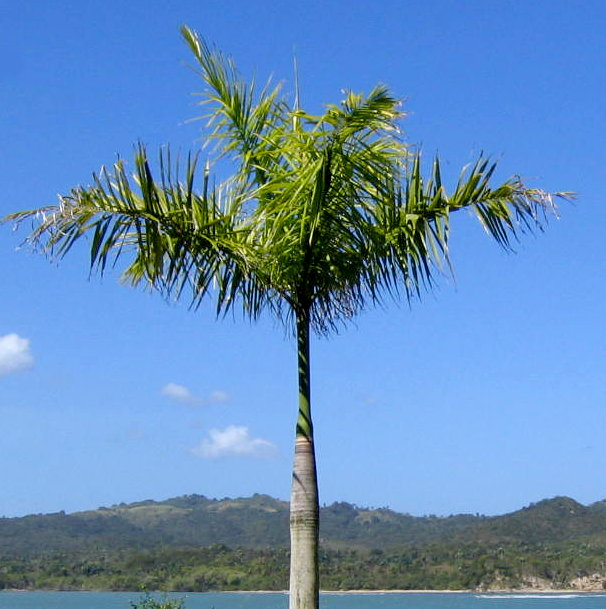
Crownshaft on a royal palm, Dominican Republic
