= Bactris nancibaensis =

Conservation status
- Critically Endangered (IUCN 2.3)

Scientific classification
- Kingdom: Plantae
- Clade: Tracheophytes
- Clade: Angiosperms
- Clade: Monocots
- Clade: Commelinids
- Order: Arecales
- Family: Arecaceae
- Genus: Bactris
- Species: B. nancibaensis

Binomial name
- Bactris nancibaensis Granv.

Species of palm

Bactris nancibaensis is a species of flowering plant in the family Arecaceae. Found only in French Guiana, it is threatened by habitat loss.

Only two specimens are known: occurring south of the Cayenne area. One has been transplanted to formerly ORSTOM, now IRD (or Institut de recherche pour le développement) Botanical Garden, where it has been observed to flower. The other specimen is located close to a road.
