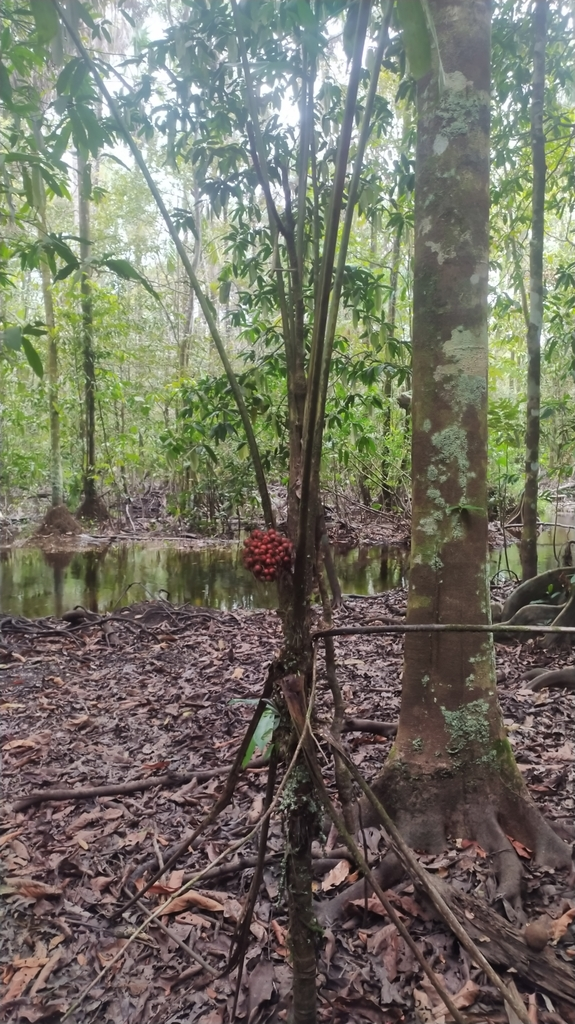

Scientific classification
- Kingdom: Plantae
- Clade: Embryophytes
- Clade: Tracheophytes
- Clade: Spermatophytes
- Clade: Angiosperms
- Clade: Monocots
- Clade: Commelinids
- Order: Arecales
- Family: Arecaceae
- Genus: Bactris
- Species: B. pliniana

Binomial name
- Bactris pliniana Granv. & A.J.Hend.

= Bactris pliniana =

Species of flowering plant

Bactris pliniana is a species of flowering plant in the family Arecaceae. It is a shrub or palm tree with spiny stems, six to twelve leaves, and orange fruits. The species is native to South America, and was described in 1994.

== Taxonomy ==
The species was described by Jean-Jacques de Granville and Andrew Henderson in 1994. The type specimen was collected in 1973, near the Waki river.

== Distribution ==
Bactris pliniana is native to the wet tropical biome of northern Brazil (Acre, Amazonas, Amapá and Pará), French Guiana, Guyana, Suriname, and Peru (Department of Loreto).

It grows in igapó forests, at elevations below 350 metres (1,150 ft).

== Description ==
Bactris pliniana is a shrub or palm tree with solitary stems. It grows 1.5–3 metres (4.9–9.8 ft) high, and 2.5–5 centimetres (0.98–1.97 in). The stem has flattened black spines, that are 1–4 centimetres (0.39–1.57 in) long.

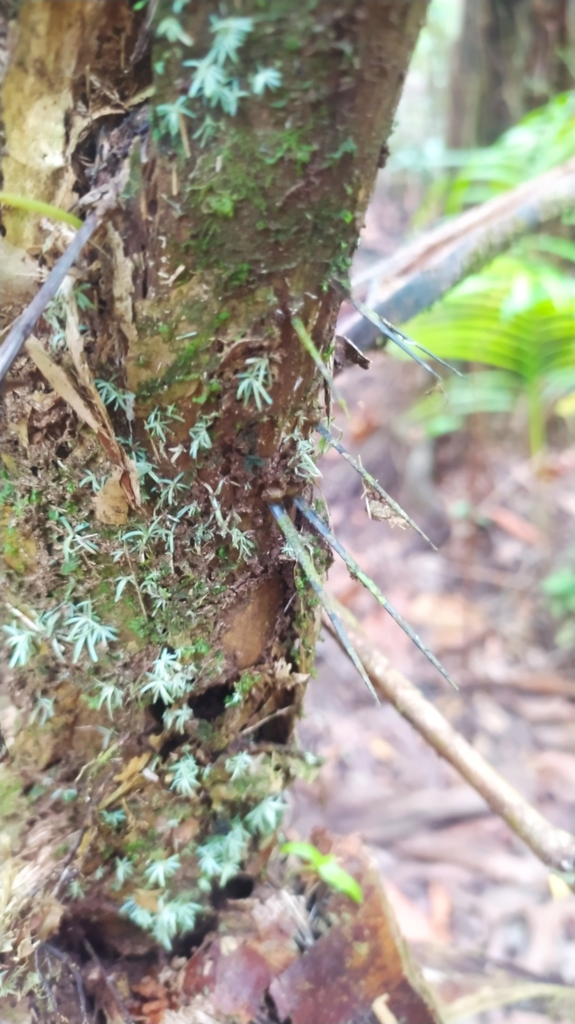
Bactris pliniana has spiny stems.

The plant has six to twelve leaves. The leaves are 2–4.5 metres (6.6–14.8 ft) long. The leaves have twelve to thirty pairs of pinnae, in seven to ten irregular clusters of two to seven pinnae. The leaves have scattered black spines, that are up to 4 centimetres (1.6 in) long. The leaf stem is 0.2–1 metre (0.66–3.28 ft) long, yellowish-green, and cylindrical.

The inflorescences are branching. The inflorescence stems are 9–25 centimetres (3.5–9.8 in) long, curved, and flattened. The flower stems have black spines that are up to 7 centimetres (2.8 in) long.

The male flowers are paired or solitary, and 2–3 millimetres (0.079–0.118 in) long. The male flowers have sepals which fuse to form a three lobed calyx. The lobes are around 0.5 millimetres (0.020 in) long. The petals are fleshy, obovate, 2–2.5 millimetres (0.079–0.098 in) long, and fused for around half their length. The male flowers have six stamens.

The female flowers are 3–5 millimetres (0.12–0.20 in) long, and have sepals that are fused into a cup-shaped calyx. The calyx is around 1 millimetre (0.039 in) long, and 2–3 millimetres (0.079–0.118 in) wide. The petals are fused into a spiny, brownish-black corolla, which is tube-shaped, and 3–5 millimetres (0.12–0.20 in) long.

The plant flowers from June to November.

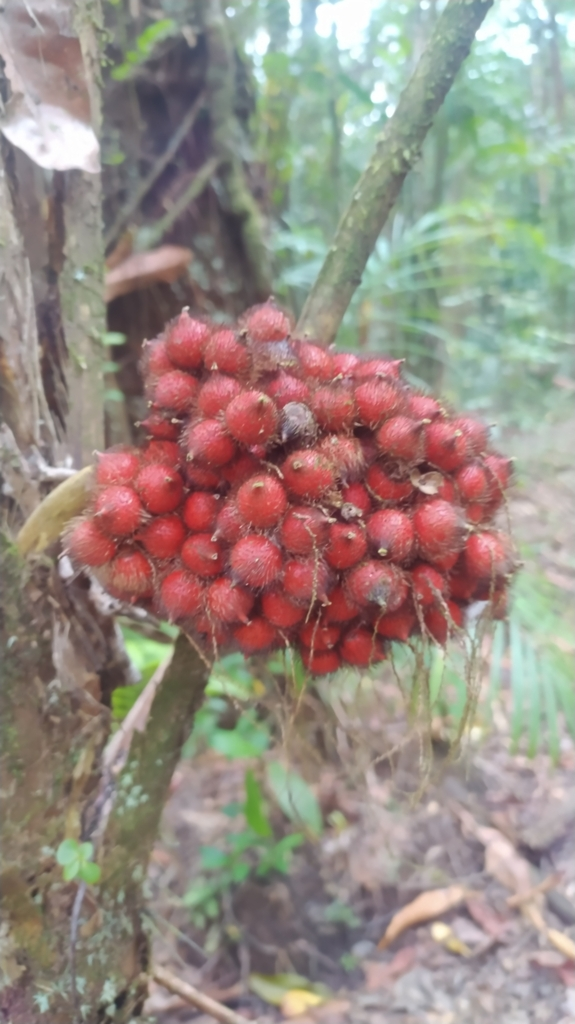
Bactris pliniana has red fruits.

The fruits are globose to obovoid, and 1.2–2 centimetres (0.47–0.79 in) wide. The fruits ripen from yellowish-green to bright orange or red. The epicarp is spiny, the mesocarp is starchy, and the endocarp is turbinate. The plant fruits from December to May.

== Etymology ==
Bactris pliniana is named for Dr Plinio Sist, the first person to recognise the species as distinct.
