= Bactris chaveziae =

Scientific classification
- Kingdom: Plantae
- Clade: Tracheophytes
- Clade: Angiosperms
- Clade: Monocots
- Clade: Commelinids
- Order: Arecales
- Family: Arecaceae
- Genus: Bactris
- Species: B. chaveziae

Binomial name
- Bactris chaveziae A.J.Hend.

Synonyms
- Bactris concinna var. sigmoidea A.J.Hend.

Species of flowering plant

Bactris chaveziae is a species of flowering plant in the family Arecaceae. It is a shrub with spiny stems and purple-black fruits. The species is native to Peru, Bolivia, and Brazil, and was described in 1995.

== Taxonomy ==
The species was described in 1995, by Andrew James Henderson, and published as Bactris concinna var. sigmoidea. In 2000, Henderson placed it as a distinct species named Bactris chaveziae.

== Distribution ==
Bactris chaveziae is native to the wet tropical biome of Peru (Cusco, Madre de Dios, and Pasco), Bolivia (La Paz, Santa Cruz), and northern Brazil (Acre).

== Description ==
Bactris chaveziae is a shrub. The stems are 0.7–4 metres (2.3–13.1 ft) tall, and 1.5–2 centimetres (0.59–0.79 in) wide. The stems have black spines that are up to 4 centimetres (1.6 in) long.

The plant has six to ten leaves, which have eight to nineteen irregularly clustered pinnae on each side, and scattered yellowish-brown spines. The leaf stem is 70–80 centimetres (28–31 in) long.

The inflorescence stem is straight, and up to 15 centimetres (5.9 in) long. The male flowers are 4–6 millimetres (0.16–0.24 in) long, and have sepal lobes that are around 1 millimetre (0.039 in) long. The male flowers have six stamens. The female flowers are 2–3 millimetres (0.079–0.118 in) long, and have a tube-shaped calyx which is around 2 millimetres (0.079 in) long, and a tube-shaped, 2–3 millimetres (0.079–0.118 in) long corolla.

The fruits are purple-black, 2–3.5 centimetres (0.79–1.38 in) long, and 1–2 centimetres (0.39–0.79 in) wide. The epicarp is smooth, the mesocarp is juicy, and the endocarp is ellipsoid.
