= Bactris concinna =

Conservation status
- Least Concern (IUCN 3.1)

Scientific classification
- Kingdom: Plantae
- Clade: Tracheophytes
- Clade: Angiosperms
- Clade: Monocots
- Clade: Commelinids
- Order: Arecales
- Family: Arecaceae
- Genus: Bactris
- Species: B. concinna

Binomial name
- Bactris concinna Mart.

Synonyms
- Pyrenoglyphis concinna (Mart.) Burret; Bactris concinna subsp. depauperata Trail; Bactris concinna var. inundata Spruce; Pyrenoglyphis concinna var. depauperata (Trail) Burret; Pyrenoglyphis concinna var. inundata (Spruce) Burret

Species of flowering plant

Bactris concinna is a species of flowering plant in the family Arecaceae. It is a shrub or tree with spiny stems and purple-black fruits. The species is native to South America.

Bactris concinna was described in 1826, and is listed as of Least Concern by the IUCN.

== Taxonomy ==
Bactris concinna was described by Carl Friedrich Philipp von Martius in 1826.

== Distribution ==
Bactris concinna is native to the wet tropical biome of Bolivia, northern Brazil, Colombia, Ecuador, and Peru. It grows in lowland rainforests, and in wet places such as river banks.

== Description ==
Bactris concinna is a shrub or tree. The stems are spiny, 1–4 metres (3.3–13.1 ft) tall, 1.5–2 centimetres (0.59–0.79 in) wide, and form small clumps. The spines are up to 5 centimetres (2.0 in) long.

The plant has three to ten leaves, which have scattered black or brownish spines that are up to 2 centimetres (0.79 in) long. The leaf stems are 12–74 centimetres (4.7–29.1 in) long. The leaves have sixteen to fifty-two pinnae.

The inflorescence stem is curved, and 14–30 centimetres (5.5–11.8 in) long. The male flowers are 6–10 millimetres (0.24–0.39 in) long, and have 2–4 millimetres (0.079–0.157 in) long sepal lobes. The male flowers have six to ten stamens. The female flowers are up to 6 millimetres (0.24 in) long, and have a tube-shaped calyx that is 3–4 millimetres (0.12–0.16 in) long. The female flowers have a spiny, tube-shaped corolla that is up to 5 millimetres (0.20 in) long.

The fruits are purple-black, obovoid, 2–3 centimetres (0.79–1.18 in) long, and 1–1.5 centimetres (0.39–0.59 in) wide. The epicarp is apiny, the mesocarp is juicy, and the endocarp is ellipsoid.

== Uses ==
The fruits are eaten by humans and domestic animals.

== Conservation ==
In 2018, the IUCN assessed Bactris concinna as of Least Concern. The population is large, and faces no major threats.
