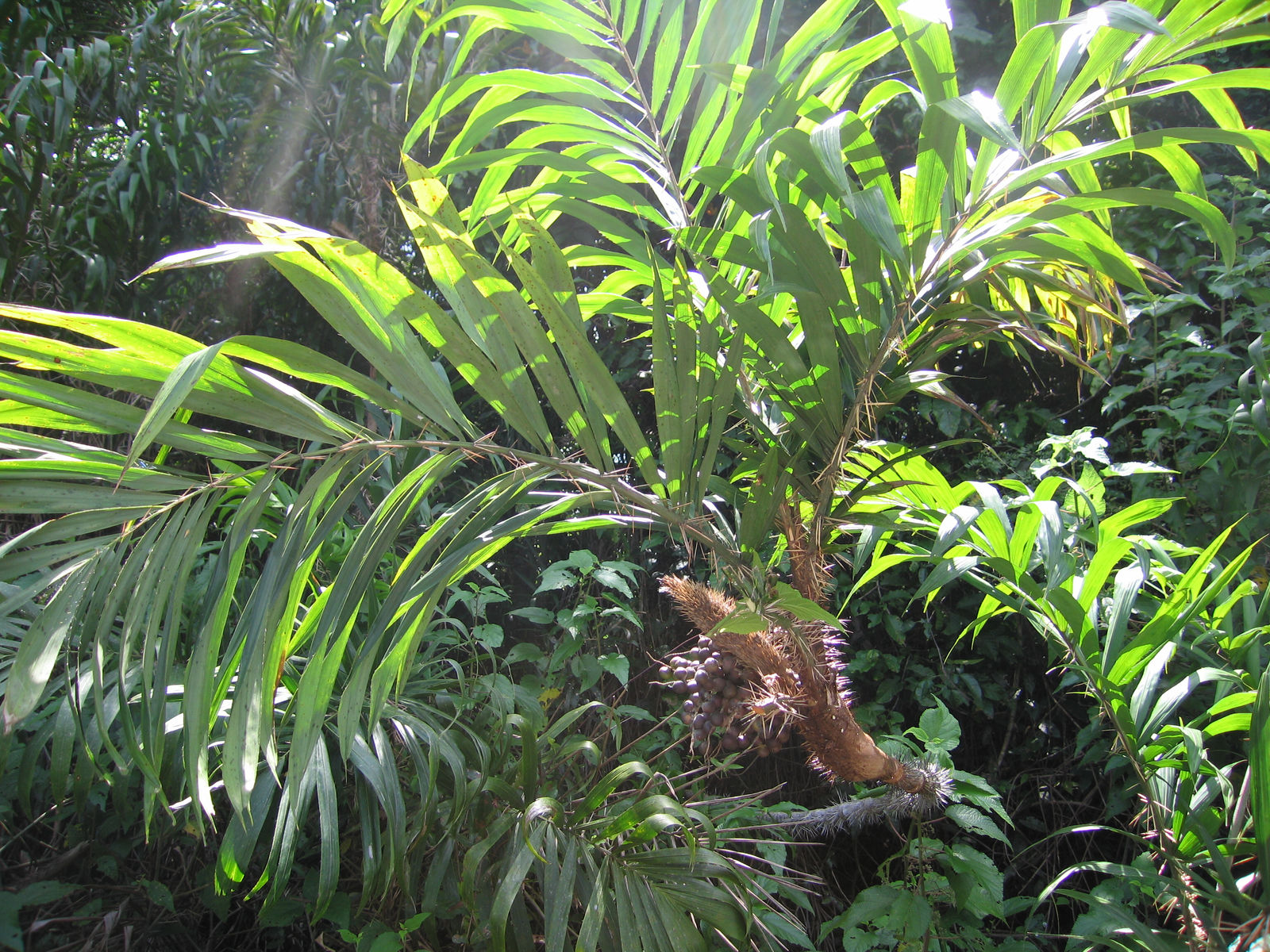

Conservation status
- Least Concern (IUCN 3.1)

Scientific classification
- Kingdom: Plantae
- Clade: Embryophytes
- Clade: Tracheophytes
- Clade: Angiosperms
- Clade: Monocots
- Clade: Commelinids
- Order: Arecales
- Family: Arecaceae
- Genus: Bactris
- Species: B. brongniartii

Binomial name
- Bactris brongniartii Mart.

Synonyms
- Synonymy: Pyrenoglyphis brongniartii (Mart.) Burret; Bactris burretii Glassman; Bactris cuyabaensis Barb.Rodr.; Bactris flavispina Heynh.; Bactris maraya-acu Barb.Rodr.; Bactris pallidispina Mart.; Bactris piscatorum Wedd. ex Drude; Bactris rivularis Barb.Rodr.; Bactris stictacantha Burret; Bactris tenera (H.Karst.) H.Wendl.; Guilielma tenera H.Karst.; Pyrenoglyphis microcarpa Burret; Pyrenoglyphis pallidispina (Mart.) Burret; Pyrenoglyphis piscatorum (Wedd. ex Drude) Burret; Pyrenoglyphis rivularis (Barb.Rodr.) Burret; Pyrenoglyphis tenera (H.Karst.) Burret

= Bactris brongniartii =

Species of flowering plant

Bactris brongniartii is a species of flowering plant in the family Arecaceae. It is a shrub or tree with spiny stems, pinnate leaves, and edible purple to black fruits. The species is native to South America, and was described in 1844.

The IUCN lists Bactris brongniartii as of Least Concern.

== Taxonomy ==
Bactris brongniartii was described by Carl Friedrich Philipp von Martius in 1844.

== Distribution ==
Bactris brongniartii is native to the wet tropical biome of Bolivia, Brazil (north, north-east, and west-central), Colombia, French Guiana, Guyana, Peru, Suriname, and Venezuela.

The species grows along rivers and in seasonally flooded areas, at low elevations.

== Description ==
Bactris brongniartii is a shrub or tree. The stems are 3–6 metres (9.8–19.7 ft) tall, 3–6 centimetres (1.2–2.4 in) wide, spiny, and often form large clumps.

The plant has four to seven leaves, which have yellow or yellowish-brown spines. The leaf stems are 10–70 centimetres (3.9–27.6 in) long. The leaves have twenty-three to thirty-four pinnae on each side. The pinnae are linear-lanceolate, spiny, and irregularly arranged in clumps of two to five.

The inflorescence stem is 20–60 centimetres (7.9–23.6 in) long, curved, and spiny. The male flowers are deciduous, and 3.5–4.5 millimetres (0.14–0.18 in) long. The male flowers have 1–2 millimetres (0.039–0.079 in) long sepal lobes, and six stamens. The female flowers are around 3 millimetres (0.12 in) long, and have a tube-shaped, 2.5–3 millimetres (0.098–0.118 in) long calyx. The corolla of female flowers is 2.5–3 millimetres (0.098–0.118 in) long, and tube-shaped. The plant flowers from November to February.

The fruits are roughly spherical, 1.3–1.7 centimetres (0.51–0.67 in) long, and purple to black in colour when mature. The mesocarp is juicy, and the endocarp is roughtly oblong or spherical. The plant fruits from March to September.

== Uses ==
The fruits are commonly eaten.

== Conservation ==
In 2018, the IUCN assessed Bactris brongniartii as of Least Concern. The population is large, and faces no significant threats.

== Nomenclature ==
In Spanish, the species is known as Uvita de Gallinaza, Uvita Gallinaza, Palma de Cubarro, Palma Cubarro, Mararay, Espina, Cubarro, Cubarra, Cubaro, Chascarrás, Chascarrá, Chacarrá, Caña Negra, Cachipay Montañero, or Albarico.
