= Bactris ana-juliae =

Scientific classification
- Kingdom: Plantae
- Clade: Embryophytes
- Clade: Tracheophytes
- Clade: Angiosperms
- Clade: Monocots
- Clade: Commelinids
- Order: Arecales
- Family: Arecaceae
- Genus: Bactris
- Species: B. ana-juliae

Binomial name
- Bactris ana-juliae Cascante

Species of flowering plant

Bactris ana-juliae is a species of flowering plant in the family Arecaceae. The species is native to Costa Rica, and was described in 2000.

== Taxonomy ==
The species was described by Alfredo Cascante-Marin in 2000.

== Distribution ==
Bactris ana-juliae is native to the wet tropical biome of Costa Rica.
