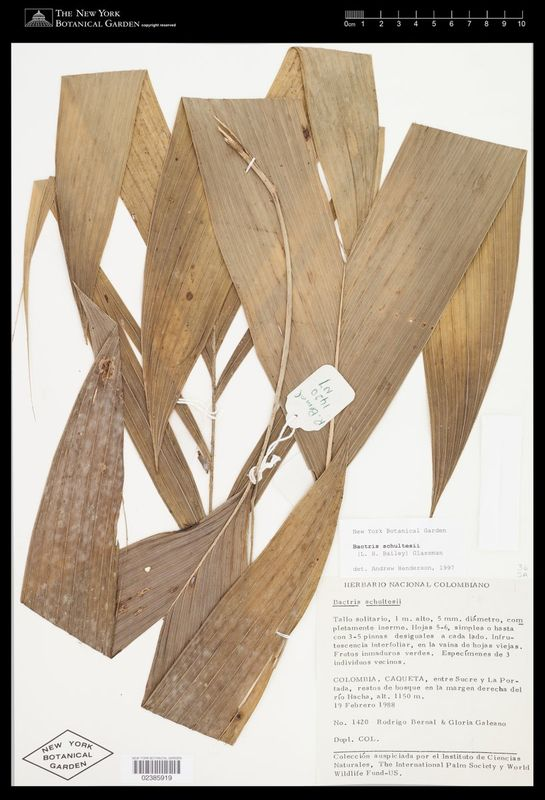

Scientific classification
- Kingdom: Plantae
- Clade: Embryophytes
- Clade: Tracheophytes
- Clade: Spermatophytes
- Clade: Angiosperms
- Clade: Monocots
- Clade: Commelinids
- Order: Arecales
- Family: Arecaceae
- Genus: Bactris
- Species: B. schultesii

Binomial name
- Bactris schultesii (L.H.Bailey) Glassman

Synonyms
- Yuyba schultesii L.H.Bailey

= Bactris schultesii =

Species of flowering plant

Bactris schultesii is a species of flowering plant in the family Arecaceae. It is a shrub with five to nine oblong leaves, and red to orange fruits.

The species is native to South America. It was described in 1949, and received its current name in 1963.

== Taxonomy ==
Bactris schultesii was described in 1949, by Liberty Hyde Bailey, who placed it in the genus Yuyba. In 1963, Sidney Frederick Glassman moved all species of Yuyba to Bactris, creating the new combination Bactris schultesii.

== Distribution ==
Bactris schultesii is native to the wet tropical biome of Colombia (Caquetá Department and Putumayo Department), Ecuador (Napo Province and Sucumbíos Province), and Peru (Amazonas Department and Loreto Department).

The species grows in lowland rainforests, at elevations of 180–1,150 metres (590–3,770 ft).

== Description ==
Bactris schultesii is a shrub. The stems are 0.8–1.5 metres (2.6–4.9 ft) tall, and 0.7–1.7 centimetres (0.28–0.67 in) wide. The stems lack spines.

The plant has five to nine leaves, which lack spines, except at the apex, or have small spines on the margins. The leaves can be simple or pinnate, and are usually oblong. The leaves are 21–64 centimetres (8.3–25.2 in) long, and 7–35 centimetres (2.8–13.8 in) wide. The leaf stems are 8–15 centimetres (3.1–5.9 in) long.

The male flowers are 3–3.5 millimetres (0.12–0.14 in) long, and have six stamens. The sepals have lobes around 1 millimetre (0.039 in) long. The female flowers can be up to 2.5 millimetres (0.098 in) long. The calyx and corolla are both tubular, and 2–2.5 millimetres (0.079–0.098 in) long. The flower stems are 2–5 centimetres (0.79–1.97 in) long, and curved.

The fruits are red to orange, round, and 0.7–1 centimetre (0.28–0.39 in) in diameter. The mesocarp is starchy. The endocarp is obovoid, and has equally spaced pores.

== Uses ==
The species is used for food.
