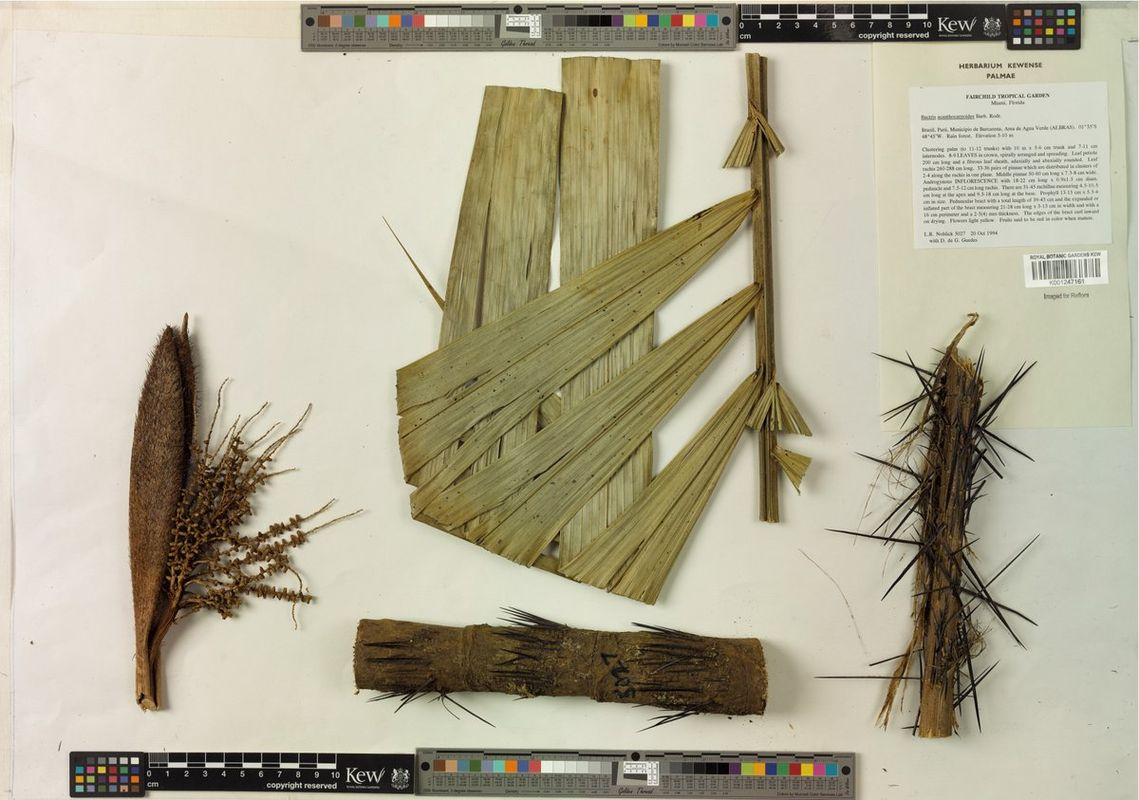

Conservation status
- Least Concern (IUCN 3.1)

Scientific classification
- Kingdom: Plantae
- Clade: Embryophytes
- Clade: Tracheophytes
- Clade: Angiosperms
- Clade: Monocots
- Clade: Commelinids
- Order: Arecales
- Family: Arecaceae
- Genus: Bactris
- Species: B. acanthocarpoides

Binomial name
- Bactris acanthocarpoides Barb.Rodr.

= Bactris acanthocarpoides =

Species of flowering plant

Bactris acanthocarpoides is a species of flowering plant in the family Arecaceae. It is a tree with spines, compound leaves, and yellow to red fruits. The species is native to South America.

Bactris acanthocarpoides was described in 1875, and is listed as of Least Concern by the IUCN.

== Taxonomy ==
The species was described by João Barbosa Rodrigues in 1875.

== Distribution ==
Bactris acanthocarpoides is native to the wet tropical biome of northern Brazil, French Guiana, Guyana, and Suriname. It grows in lowland rainforests, and near streams, at elevations of 200–260 metres (660–850 ft).

== Description ==
Bactris acanthocarpoides is a tree that grows 2–4 metres (6.6–13.1 ft) high, and 2–4 centimetres (0.79–1.57 in) wide. The stems are spiny, and arranged into clumps of two to six.

The plant has six to fifteen leaves, with scattered black spines. The leaves are compound, and have twenty to forty pinnae on each side. The leaf stems are 0.6–2 metres (2.0–6.6 ft) long, which are arranged into clusters of two to six.

The inflorescences grow on 8–15 centimetres (3.1–5.9 in) stems. The male flowers are 2–3 millimetres (0.079–0.118 in) long. The male flowers have 0.5–1 millimetre (0.020–0.039 in) long sepal lobes, 2–3 millimetres (0.079–0.118 in) long petals, and zero, three, or six stamens. The female flowers are 4–7 millimetres (0.16–0.28 in) long, and have a cup-shaped, 1–1.5 millimetres (0.039–0.059 in) long calyx. The corolla of the female flowers is urn-shaped, 3–5 millimetres (0.12–0.20 in) long, and spiny.

The fruits are densely aggregated, obovoid in shape, 1.2–2 centimetres (0.47–0.79 in) wide, yellow to red in colour, and have soft spines. The mesocarp is starchy, and the endocarp is obovoid.

== Conservation ==
In 2018, the IUCN assessed Bactris acanthocarpoides as of Least Concern. The population is large, and faces no major threats.
