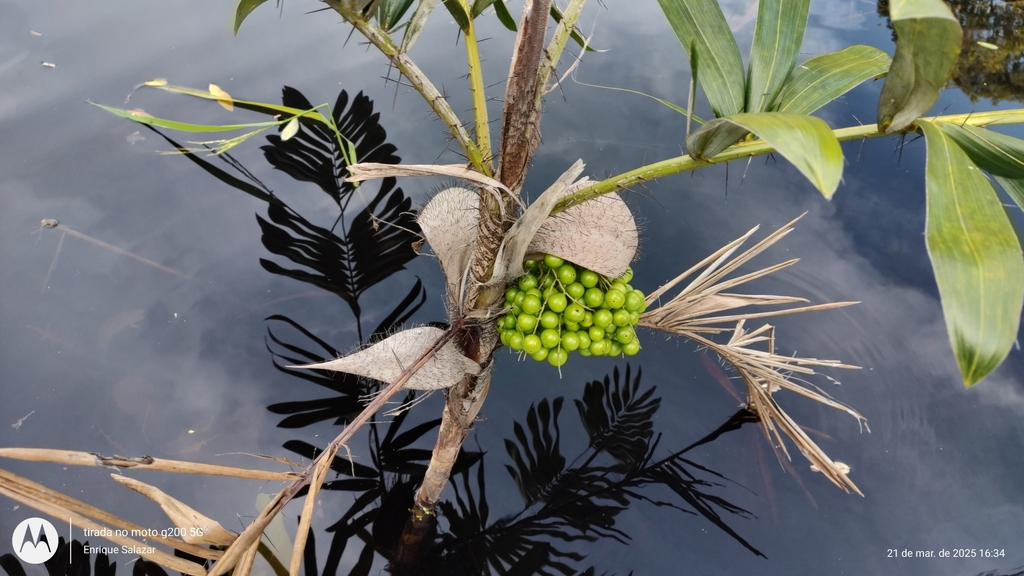

Conservation status
- Least Concern (IUCN 3.1)

Scientific classification
- Kingdom: Plantae
- Clade: Embryophytes
- Clade: Tracheophytes
- Clade: Angiosperms
- Clade: Monocots
- Clade: Commelinids
- Order: Arecales
- Family: Arecaceae
- Genus: Bactris
- Species: B. bidentula

Binomial name
- Bactris bidentula Spruce

Synonyms
- Bactris nigrispina Barb.Rodr.; Bactris palustris Barb.Rodr.

= Bactris bidentula =

Species of flowering plant

Bactris bidentula is a species of flowering plant in the family Arecaceae. It is a shrub or tree with spiny stems, pinnate leaves, and black to purple fruits. The species is native to South America, and was described in 1869.

Bactris bidentula is listed as of Least Concern by the IUCN.

== Taxonomy ==
The species was described by Richard Spruce in 1869.

== Distribution ==
Bactris bidentula is native to the wet tropical biome of Brazil (northern and west-central), Colombia, Peru, and Venezuela. It grows at elevations of up to 400 metres (1,300 ft).

== Description ==
Bactris bidentula is a shrub or tree. The stems are 1.7–5 metres (5.6–16.4 ft) tall, 3–6 centimetres (1.2–2.4 in) wide, spiny, and arranged in clumps of four to twenty.

The plant has three to sixteen leaves, which have clustered black spines. The leaf stems are 14–53 centimetres (5.5–20.9 in) long. The leaves have twenty-four to forty-nine oblanceolate or linear-lanceolate pinnae on each side, which are arranged in clusters of two to seven.

The inflorescences grow on 8–32 centimetres (3.1–12.6 in) long stems, which are straight or slightly curved, and lack spines. The male flowers are 3–4 millimetres (0.12–0.16 in) long, have 1–1.5 millimetres (0.039–0.059 in) sepal lobes, and have six stamens. The female flowers are 2.5–3 millimetres (0.098–0.118 in) long, and have a cup-shaped calyx, which is up to 1 millimetre (0.039 in) long. The corolla of the female flowers is tube-shaped, and 2.5–3 millimetres (0.098–0.118 in) long.

The fruits are up to 2 centimetres (0.79 in) wide, roughly spherical, and purple to black in colour. The mesocarp is juicy, and the endocarp is oblong.

== Uses ==
Bactris bidentula is used for food.

== Ecology ==
Bactris bidentula is eaten by fish, including Piaractus mesopotamicus and the Tambaqui.

== Conservation ==
In 2022, the IUCN assessed Bactris bidentula as of Least Concern.

== Nomenclature ==
In Spanish, the species is known as Cubarro, Coquito Espinoso de Lago, Chontaduro de Pescado, or Chontadurillo.
