= Bactris cuspidata =

Scientific classification
- Kingdom: Plantae
- Clade: Tracheophytes
- Clade: Angiosperms
- Clade: Monocots
- Clade: Commelinids
- Order: Arecales
- Family: Arecaceae
- Genus: Bactris
- Species: B. cuspidata

Binomial name
- Bactris cuspidata Mart.

Synonyms
- Amylocarpus cuspidatus (Mart.) Barb.Rodr.; Amylocarpus marajay (Barb.Rodr.) Barb.Rodr.; Amylocarpus mitis (Mart.) Barb.Rodr.; Bactris cuspidata var. angustipinnata Trail; Bactris cuspidata var. coriacea Trail; Bactris cuspidata var. marajay (Barb.Rodr.) Drude; Bactris cuspidata var. mitis (Mart.) Drude; Bactris floccosa Spruce; Bactris marajay Barb.Rodr.; Bactris mitis Mart.

Species of flowering plant

Bactris cuspidata is a species of flowering plant in the family Arecaceae. It is a shrub with pinnate leaves and orange-red fruits. The species is native to Brazil, French Guiana, and Suriname, and was described in 1826.

== Taxonomy ==
The species was described by Carl Friedrich Philipp von Martius in 1826.

== Distribution ==
Bactris cuspidata is native to the wet tropical biome of northern Brazil, French Guiana, and Suriname. It grows in lowland rainforests at elevations of 250–780 metres (820–2,560 ft).

== Description ==
Bactris cuspidata is a shrub. The stems are 1–1.5 metres (3.3–4.9 ft) tall, and 6–8 millimetres (0.24–0.31 in) wide.

The plant has four or five leaves, which have scattered black spines that are up to 2 centimetres (0.79 in) long. The leaves have six to thirteen irregularly clustered pinnae on each side. The leaf stems are 35–40 centimetres (14–16 in) long.

The inflorescence stem is curved, spiny, and 4–6 centimetres (1.6–2.4 in) long. The male flowers are up to 3 millimetres (0.12 in) long, and have sepal lobes that are up to 0.5 millimetres (0.020 in) long. The male flowers have five stamens. The female flowers are 2–3.5 millimetres (0.079–0.138 in) long, and have a 0.2–1 millimetre (0.0079–0.0394 in) long calyx and a spiny, tube-shaped, 2–3.5 millimetres (0.079–0.138 in) long corolla.

The fruits are globose to obovoid, 6–7 millimetres (0.24–0.28 in) long, and orange-red. The mesocarp is starchy, and the endocarp is turbinate.

== Nomenclature ==
In Portuguese, the species is known as marajazinho.
