= Bactris chocoensis =

Scientific classification
- Kingdom: Plantae
- Clade: Tracheophytes
- Clade: Angiosperms
- Clade: Monocots
- Clade: Commelinids
- Order: Arecales
- Family: Arecaceae
- Genus: Bactris
- Species: B. chocoensis

Binomial name
- Bactris chocoensis R.Bernal, Galeano, Copete & Cámara-Leret

Species of flowering plant

Bactris chocoensis is a species of flowering plant in the family Arecaceae. It is native to Colombia, and was described in 2014.

== Taxonomy ==
Bactris chocoensis was described by Rodrigo Bernal, Gloria Galeano Garcés, Juan Carlos Copete, and Rodrigo Cámara-Leret in 2014.

== Distribution ==
Bactris chocoensis is native to the wet tropical biome of Colombia.

== Uses ==
Bactris chocoensis is used for food.
