= Bactris constanciae =

Conservation status
- Least Concern (IUCN 2.3)

Scientific classification
- Kingdom: Plantae
- Clade: Tracheophytes
- Clade: Angiosperms
- Clade: Monocots
- Clade: Commelinids
- Order: Arecales
- Family: Arecaceae
- Genus: Bactris
- Species: B. constanciae

Binomial name
- Bactris constanciae Barb. Rodr.

Species of palm

Bactris constanciae is a species of flowering plant in the family Arecaceae. It is found in Brazil, French Guiana, Guyana, and Suriname.
