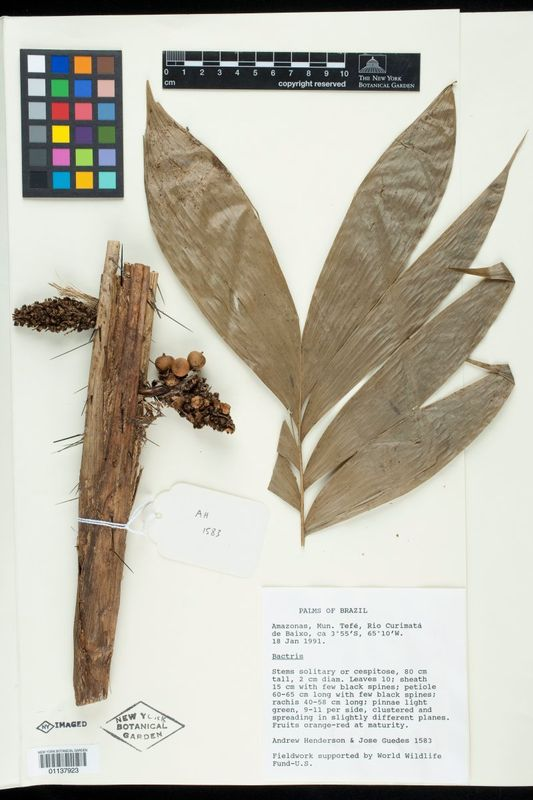

Scientific classification
- Kingdom: Plantae
- Clade: Tracheophytes
- Clade: Angiosperms
- Clade: Monocots
- Clade: Commelinids
- Order: Arecales
- Family: Arecaceae
- Genus: Bactris
- Species: B. tefensis

Binomial name
- Bactris tefensis A.J.Hend.

= Bactris tefensis =

Species of flowering plant

Bactris tefensis is a species of flowering plant in the family Arecaceae. It is a shrub with black and brown spines, and orange-red fruits. The species is native to northern Brazil, and was described in 1995.

== Taxonomy ==
The species was described by Andrew Henderson in 1995.

== Distribution ==
Bactris tefensis is native to the wet tropical biome of Amazonas, Brazil. It grows in rainforests at low elevations.

== Description ==
Bactris tefensis is a shrub. The stems are 0.8–1.5 metres (2.6–4.9 ft) high, 1.5–2 centimetres (0.59–0.79 in) wide, and covered in decaying leaf bases.

The plant has four to ten leaves, with scattered black spines up to 4 centimetres (1.6 in) long. The leaves have nine to thirteen light green pinnae on each side, which are arranged in clusters of two or three. The leaf stems are 0.6–1 metre (2.0–3.3 ft) long.

The inflorescence stem is curved, up to 10 centimetres (3.9 in) long, and densely covered in spines. The female flowers are up to 4 millimetres (0.16 in) long. The calyx is cup-shaped, and around 1 millimetre (0.039 in) long. The corolla is around 3 millimetres (0.12 in) long, and tube-shaped. Both the calyx and corolla have brown spines, which are bent alternately in different directions.

The fruits are orange-red, around 1 centimetre (0.39 in) wide, and broadly obovoid. The mesocarp is starchy, and the endocarp is turbinate.
