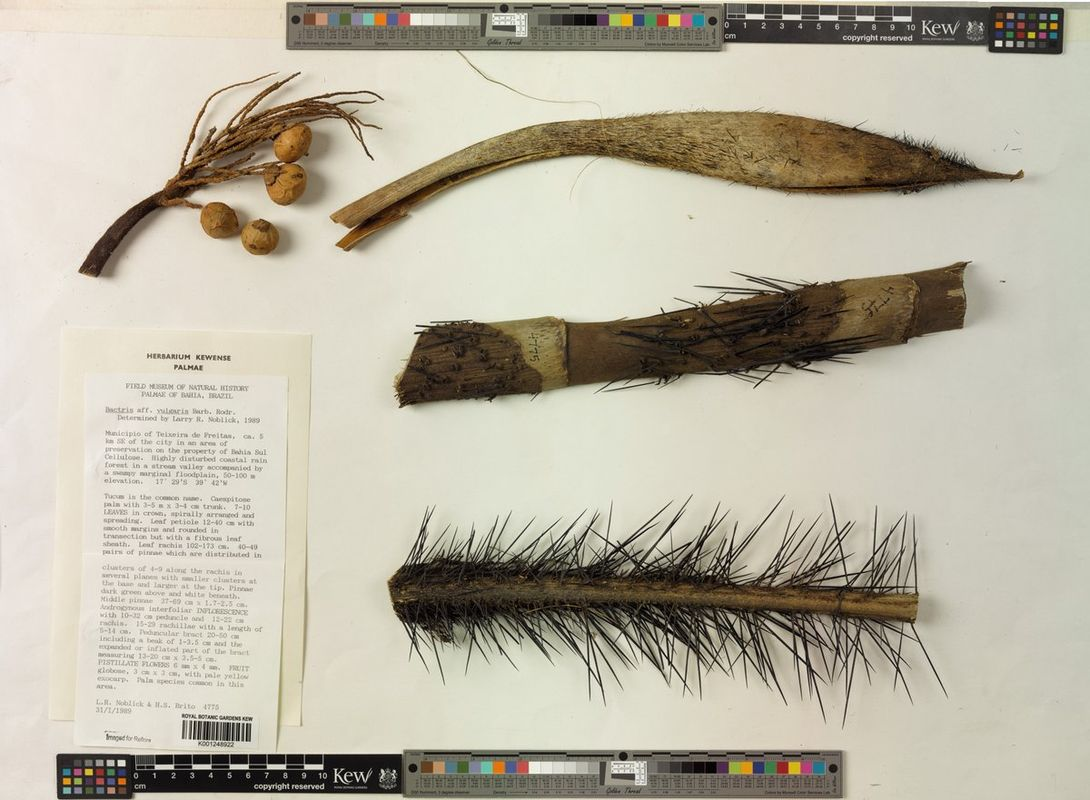

Scientific classification
- Kingdom: Plantae
- Clade: Embryophytes
- Clade: Tracheophytes
- Clade: Spermatophytes
- Clade: Angiosperms
- Clade: Monocots
- Clade: Commelinids
- Order: Arecales
- Family: Arecaceae
- Genus: Bactris
- Species: B. vulgaris

Binomial name
- Bactris vulgaris Barb.Rodr.

Synonyms
- Bactris glazioviana Drude; Bactris polyclada Burret

= Bactris vulgaris =

Species of flowering plant

Bactris vulgaris is a species of flowering plant in the family Arecaceae. It is a shrub or palm tree with a spiny stem, four to ten leaves, and yellow or purplish-black fruits. The species is native to Brazil, and was described in 1879.

== Taxonomy ==
The species was described by João Barbosa Rodrigues in 1879.

== Distribution ==
Bactris vulgaris is native to the wet tropical biome of Brazil. It grows in the north-east (Bahia and Pernambuco), south (Paraná), and south-east (Espírito Santo, Rio de Janeiro and São Paulo). The species grows in Atlantic coastal forests and lowland rainforests, on non-flooded soils, at elevations of 50–100 metres (160–330 ft).

== Description ==
Bactris vulgaris is a shrub or palm tree. The stems are 1–3 metres (3.3–9.8 ft) tall, 2–4 centimetres (0.79–1.57 in) wide, spiny, and form clumps.

The plant has four to ten leaves, which are compound, and have twenty-one to forty-nine pinnae on each side. The pinnae are linear-lanceolate, arranged into irregular clusters, and have spiny edges. The spines are clustered, black, cylindrical, and up to 9 centimetres (3.5 in) long. The leaf stem is 12–98 centimetres (4.7–38.6 in) long.

The flower stem is 6–32 centimetres (2.4–12.6 in) long, curved, and spiny. The male flowers are 5–5.5 millimetres (0.20–0.22 in) long, and have six stamens. The sepal lobes are 1.5–2 millimetres (0.059–0.079 in) long. The female flowers are 3–6 millimetres (0.12–0.24 in) long. The calyx is cup-shaped, and 1–2 millimetres (0.039–0.079 in) long. The corolla (botany) is tube-shaped, 3–6 millimetres (0.12–0.24 in) long, and spiny.

The fruits are obovoid, 1.8–3 centimetres (0.71–1.18 in) wide, and yellow or purplish-black. The epicarp is smooth. The mesocarp is juicy, and the endocarp is turbinate.

== Nomenclature ==
In Portuguese, the species is known as Tucum-preto, Tucum, Palmeira-tucum, Coqueiro-de-espinho, Brejaúba, or Airi-mirim.
