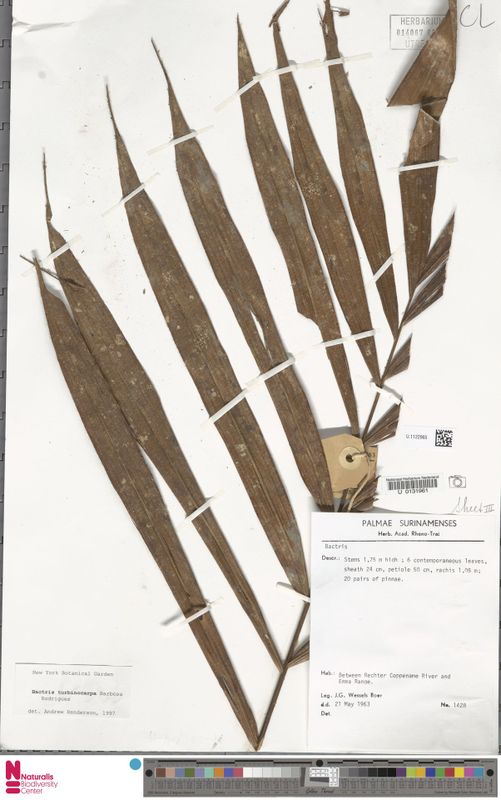

Conservation status
- Least Concern (IUCN 3.1)

Scientific classification
- Kingdom: Plantae
- Clade: Tracheophytes
- Clade: Angiosperms
- Clade: Monocots
- Clade: Commelinids
- Order: Arecales
- Family: Arecaceae
- Genus: Bactris
- Species: B. turbinocarpa

Binomial name
- Bactris turbinocarpa Barb.Rodr.

Synonyms
- Pyrenoglyphis turbinocarpa (Barb.Rodr.) Burret

= Bactris turbinocarpa =

Species of flowering plant

Bactris turbinocarpa is a species of flowering plant in the family Arecaceae. It is a shrub or palm tree with spiny stems, six to thirteen leaves, and purplish fruits. The species is native to Suriname and Brazil.

Bactris turbinocarpa was described in 1875. The IUCN lists it as Least Concern, although no specimens have been collected since the 1960s.

== Taxonomy ==
The species was described by João Barbosa Rodrigues in 1875.

== Distribution ==
Bactris turbinocarpa is native to the wet tropical biome of Suriname and Brazil (Pará). Its extent of occurrence is around 3,441 square kilometres (1,329 sq mi). The species grows in the Guianan moist forests and Uatuma–Trombetas moist forests, at elevations of up to 100 metres (330 ft).

== Description ==
Bactris turbinocarpa is a shrub or palm tree. The stems are 1–1.7 metres (3.3–5.6 ft) high, 2–2.5 centimetres (0.79–0.98 in) wide, and spiny.

The plant has six to thirteen leaves. The leaves are linear-lanceolate, and have fifteen to twenty-two regularly arranged pinnae on each side. The leaves have scattered black spines up to 9 centimetres (3.5 in) long. The leaf stem is 50–57 centimetres (20–22 in) long.

The flower stems are 22–30 centimetres (8.7–11.8 in) long, and curved.

The fruits are purplish, obovoid, 2.5–3.5 centimetres (0.98–1.38 in) long, and 1.5–2 centimetres (0.59–0.79 in) wide, and covered in short spines. The mesocarp is juicy, and the endocarp is turbinate.

== Conservation ==
In 2009, the IUCN assessed Bactris turbinocarpa as of Least Concern. The species was previously assessed as Vulnerable in Suriname, and as Endangered in Brazil. No specimens have been collected since the 1960s. The species' habitat is relatively intact, and includes the Central Suriname Nature Reserve and the Rio Trombetas Biological Reserve.
