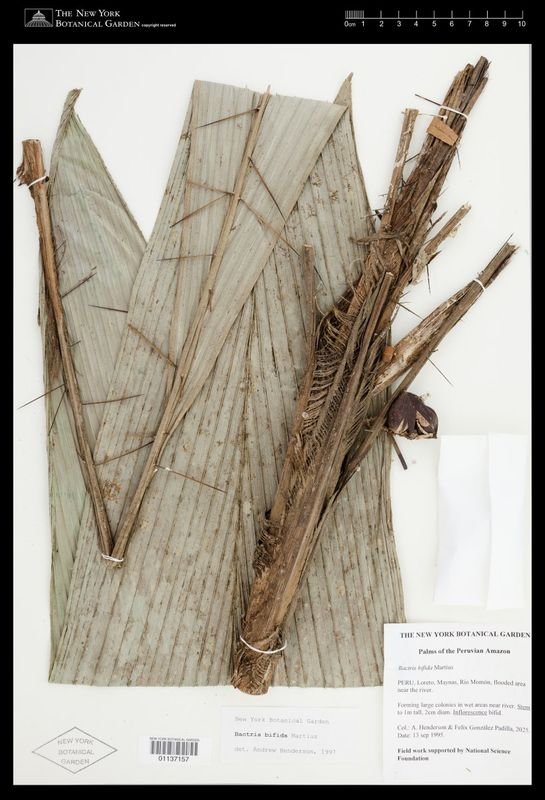

Conservation status
- Least Concern (IUCN 3.1)

Scientific classification
- Kingdom: Plantae
- Clade: Embryophytes
- Clade: Tracheophytes
- Clade: Angiosperms
- Clade: Monocots
- Clade: Commelinids
- Order: Arecales
- Family: Arecaceae
- Genus: Bactris
- Species: B. bifida

Binomial name
- Bactris bifida Mart.

Synonyms
- Pyrenoglyphis bifida (Mart.) Burret; Bactris angustifolia Dammer; Bactris bifida var. humaitensis Trail; Bactris bifida var. puruensis Trail

= Bactris bifida =

Species of flowering plant

Bactris bifida is a species of flowering plant in the family Arecaceae. It is a shrub or tree with spiny stems and leaves, and purple to black fruits. The species is native to Brazil, Colombia, and Peru.

Bactris bifida was described in 1826, and is listed as of Least Concern by the IUCN.

== Taxonomy ==
The species was described by Carl Friedrich Philipp von Martius in 1826.

== Distribution ==
Bactris bifida is native to the wet tropical biome of northern Brazil (Acre and Amazonas), Colombia (Amazonas), and Peru (Huánuco, Loreto, San Martín, and Ucayali).

It grows in lowland rainforests, at elevations of up to 1,400 metres (4,600 ft).

== Description ==
Bactris bifida is a shrub or tree with clumping stems that grow 1–4 metres (3.3–13.1 ft) high, and 1–2 centimetres (0.39–0.79 in) wide. It has yellow prickles, which are up to 5 centimetres (2.0 in) long.

The plant has four to ten leaves, which are 40–100 centimetres (1.3–3.3 ft) long, and usually simple. The leaves have a metallic sheen when dry, and have scattered brown or black spines, which are up to 8 centimetres (3.1 in) long. The leaves have smooth edges. The leaf stems are 12–22 centimetres (4.7–8.7 in) long.

The inflorescence stem is 15–25 centimetres (5.9–9.8 in) long, straight or slightly curved, and not spiny. The male flowers are deciduous, 3–6 millimetres (0.12–0.24 in) long, and have 1–1.5 millimetres (0.039–0.059 in) sepal lobes. The male flowers have 3–5.5 millimetres (0.12–0.22 in) petals, and six stamens. The female flowers are 3–4 millimetres (0.12–0.16 in) long, and have a tube-shaped calyx. The corolla is tube-shaped, and 2.5–3.5 millimetres (0.098–0.138 in) long.

The fruits are 2–2.5 centimetres (0.79–0.98 in) long, 1–1.5 centimetres (0.39–0.59 in) wide, narrowly ellipsoid or ovoid, purple to black, and sometimes have small spines. The mesocarp is juicy, and the endocarp is ellipsoid.

== Uses ==
Bactris bifida is used for food.

== Conservation ==
In 2022, the IUCN assessed Bactris bifida as of Least Concern.

== Nomenclature ==
In Portuguese, the species is known as Ubim de Espinho, marajá, or marajá-da-várzea. In Spanish, the species is known as Ñeja Negra or Cola de Pato.
