= Bactris coloradonis =

Conservation status
- Least Concern (IUCN 3.1)

Scientific classification
- Kingdom: Plantae
- Clade: Tracheophytes
- Clade: Angiosperms
- Clade: Monocots
- Clade: Commelinids
- Order: Arecales
- Family: Arecaceae
- Genus: Bactris
- Species: B. coloradonis

Binomial name
- Bactris coloradonis L.H.Bailey

Synonyms
- Bactris porschiana Burret

Species of flowering plant

Bactris coloradonis is a species of flowering plant in the family Arecaceae. It is a shrub or tree with spiny stems and orange fruits. The species is native to Central and South America, and is used for food and construction.

Bactris coloradonis was described in 1933, and is listed as of Least Concern by the IUCN.

== Taxonomy ==
The species was described by Liberty Hyde Bailey in 1933.

== Distribution ==
Bactris coloradonis is native to the wet tropical biome of Colombia, Costa Rica, Ecuador, Nicaragua, and Panama. It grows at elevations of up to 900 metres (3,000 ft).

== Description ==
Bactris coloradonis is a shrub or tree. It grows 5–8 metres (16–26 ft) high. The trunk is around 4 centimetres (1.6 in) wide, and has brownish-black spines that are 1–5 centimetres (0.39–1.97 in) long.

The leaves are around 3 metres (9.8 ft) long, and can have over twenty-five irregularly spaced pinnate. The leaf stem can be over 1 metre (3.3 ft) long.

The inflorescence stem is 9.5–23 centimetres (3.7–9.1 in) long, and curved. The male flowers are 3–4 millimetres (0.12–0.16 in) long, and have 1–2.5 millimetres (0.039–0.098 in) long sepal lobes. The male flowers have six stamens. The female flowers are 2–3 millimetres (0.079–0.118 in) long, and have a tube shaped calyx that is around 1 millimetre (0.039 in) long. The female flowers have a tube-shaped corolla, which is 2–3 millimetres (0.079–0.118 in) long.

The fruits are broadly obovoid, orange, 2–2.5 centimetres (0.79–0.98 in) long, and around 1.5 centimetres (0.59 in) wide.

== Uses ==
Bactris coloradonis is used for food and as a source of construction materials.

== Conservation ==
In 2022, the IUCN assessed Bactris coloradonis as of Least Concern. The population is large, and faces no major threats.
