= Bactris bahiensis =

Scientific classification
- Kingdom: Plantae
- Clade: Embryophytes
- Clade: Tracheophytes
- Clade: Spermatophytes
- Clade: Angiosperms
- Clade: Monocots
- Clade: Commelinids
- Order: Arecales
- Family: Arecaceae
- Genus: Bactris
- Species: B. bahiensis

Binomial name
- Bactris bahiensis Noblick ex A.J.Hend.

Species of flowering plants

Bactris bahiensis is a species of flowering plants in the family Arecaceae. It is a shrub native to Eastern Brazil and found in wet tropical biomes. It grows purple-black fruit.
