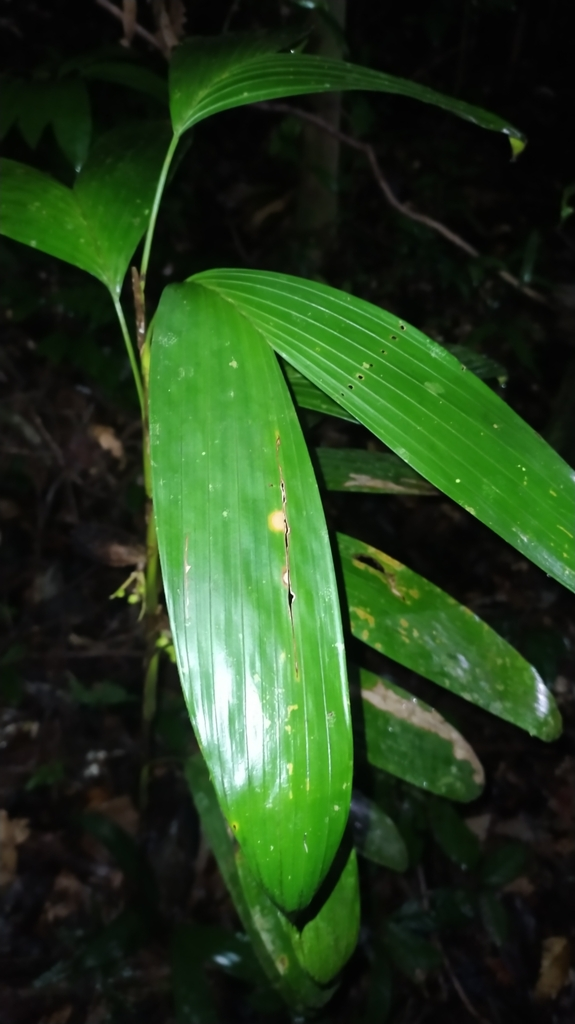

Scientific classification
- Kingdom: Plantae
- Clade: Embryophytes
- Clade: Tracheophytes
- Clade: Angiosperms
- Clade: Monocots
- Clade: Commelinids
- Order: Arecales
- Family: Arecaceae
- Genus: Bactris
- Species: B. aubletiana

Binomial name
- Bactris aubletiana Trail

= Bactris aubletiana =

Species of flowering plant

Bactris aubletiana is a species of flowering plant in the family Arecaceae. It is a shrub with ten or eleven leaves, and round orange fruits. The species is native to French Guiana and Suriname, and was described in 1876.

== Taxonomy ==
The species was described by James W. H. Trail in 1876.

== Distribution ==
Bactris aubletiana is native to the wet tropical biome of French Guiana and Suriname. It grows in lowland forests, at elevations of 10–460 metres (33–1,509 ft).

== Description ==
Bactris aubletiana is a shrub. The stems are 0.6–2 metres (2.0–6.6 ft) tall, and 3–5 millimetres (0.12–0.20 in) wide.

The plant has ten or eleven leaves, which rarely have black spines. The leaves are 17–30 centimetres (6.7–11.8 in) long, 4–10 centimetres (1.6–3.9 in) wide, and sometimes have soft spines on the edges. The leaf stems are 5–16 centimetres (2.0–6.3 in) long.

The flower stems are 3–3.5 centimetres (1.2–1.4 in) long, curved, and spiny. The male flowers are deciduous, up to 3 millimetres (0.12 in) long. The male flowers have 2.5–3.5 millimetres (0.098–0.138 in) long petals, sepal lobes that are around 1 millimetre (0.039 in) long, and six stamens. The female flowers are up to 2.5 millimetres (0.098 in) long, and have a cup-shaped, 0.5–1 millimetre (0.020–0.039 in) long calyx. The corolla of female flowers is 1.5–2 millimetres (0.059–0.079 in) long, tube-shaped, and sometimes spiny. The plant flowers from December to April.

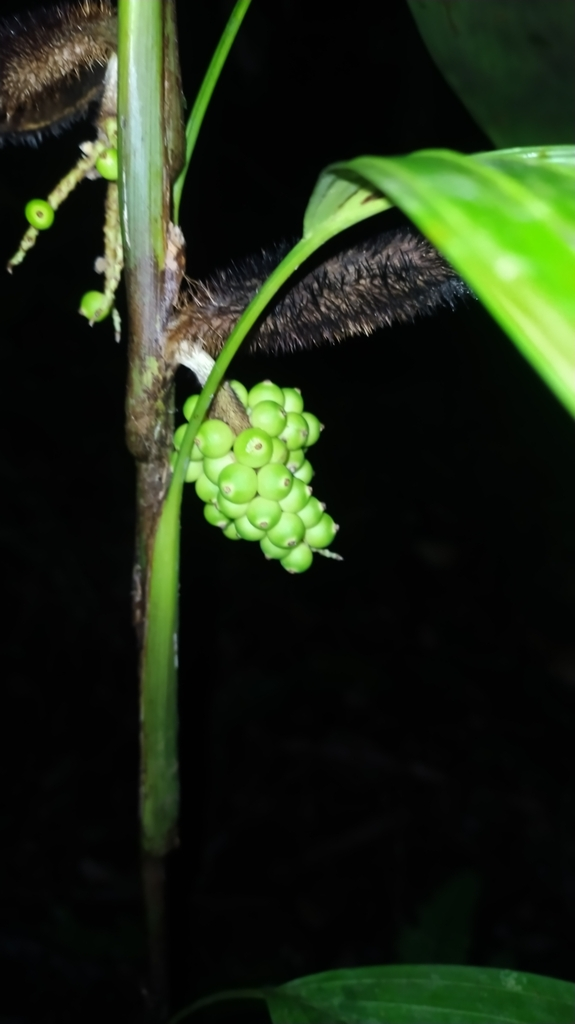
Fruits

The fruits are round, 5–8 millimetres (0.20–0.31 in) wide, and orange when mature. The mesocarp is starchy, and the endocarp is turbinate. The plant fruits from April to November.
