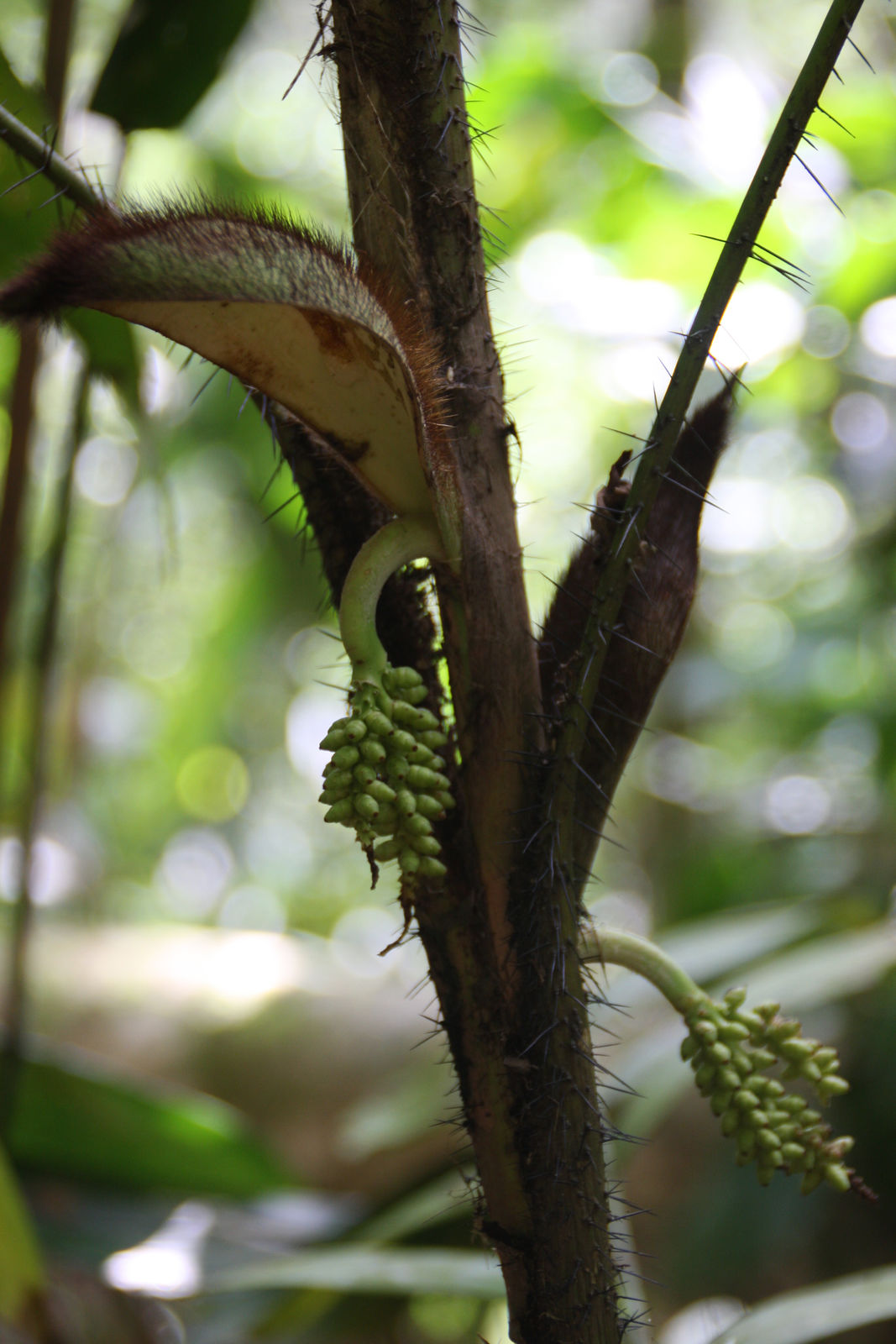

Scientific classification
- Kingdom: Plantae
- Clade: Embryophytes
- Clade: Tracheophytes
- Clade: Angiosperms
- Clade: Monocots
- Clade: Commelinids
- Order: Arecales
- Family: Arecaceae
- Genus: Bactris
- Species: B. caryotifolia

Binomial name
- Bactris caryotifolia Mart.

= Bactris caryotifolia =

Species of flowering plant

Bactris caryotifolia, commonly known as caryota-leaf peach palm, is a species of flowering plant in the family Arecaceae. It is a shrub with pinnate leaves and purple to black fruits. The species is native to Brazil, and was described in 1881.

== Taxonomy ==
The species was described by Carl Friedrich Philipp von Martius in 1826.

== Distribution ==
Bactris caryotifolia is native to the wet tropical biome of north-east and south-east Brazil (Bahia, Espírito Santo, and Rio de Janeiro).

The species grows in lowland rainforests, at elevations of up to 550 metres (1,800 ft).

== Description ==
Bactris caryotifolia is a shrub. The stems are 1–1.5 metres (3.3–4.9 ft) tall, 1–2 centimetres (0.39–0.79 in) wide, and grow in small clumps.

The plant has ten to twelve leaves, with scattered yellowish-brown spines. The leaves have eleven to thirteen wedge-shaped pinnae on each side. The leaf stem is 20–37 centimetres (7.9–14.6 in) long.

The inflorescence stem is curved, 6–15 centimetres (2.4–5.9 in) long, and may or may not have spines. The male flowers are up to 3.5 millimetres (0.14 in) long, and have sepal lobes that are up to 1 millimetre (0.039 in) long. The male flowers have six stamens. The female flowers are up to 4 millimetres (0.16 in) long. The calyx and corolla are cup-shaped, and up to 3.5 millimetres (0.14 in) long.

The fruits are 1–1.8 centimetres (0.39–0.71 in) long, globose to obovoid, and purple to black in colour. The mesocarp is juicy, and the endocarp is turbinate.

== Nomenclature ==
In English, Bactris caryotifolia is commonly known as "caryota-leaf peach palm".
