= Bactris coloniata =

Conservation status
- Vulnerable (IUCN 2.3)

Scientific classification
- Kingdom: Plantae
- Clade: Tracheophytes
- Clade: Angiosperms
- Clade: Monocots
- Clade: Commelinids
- Order: Arecales
- Family: Arecaceae
- Genus: Bactris
- Species: B. coloniata

Binomial name
- Bactris coloniata L.H.Bailey

Species of plant

Bactris coloniata is a clustering palm with stems up to 7m tall. It is found in Colombia, Panama, and Peru. It is threatened by habitat loss.
