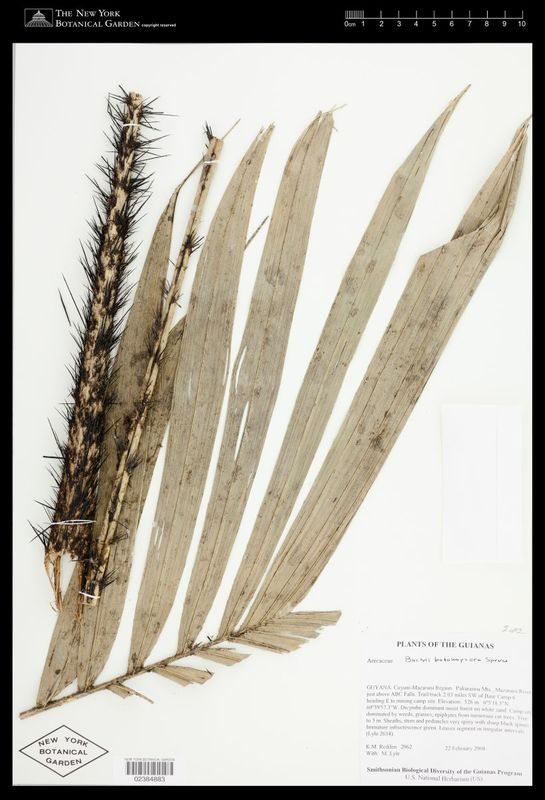

Conservation status
- Least Concern (IUCN 3.1)

Scientific classification
- Kingdom: Plantae
- Clade: Embryophytes
- Clade: Tracheophytes
- Clade: Angiosperms
- Clade: Monocots
- Clade: Commelinids
- Order: Arecales
- Family: Arecaceae
- Genus: Bactris
- Species: B. balanophora

Binomial name
- Bactris balanophora Spruce

Synonyms
- Astrocaryum aculeatum Wallace; Cocos chloroleuca Barb.Rodr.; Syagrus chloroleuca (Barb.Rodr.) Burret

= Bactris balanophora =

Species of flowering plant

Bactris balanophora is a species of flowering plant in the family Arecaceae. It is a shrub or tree with black prickles, compound leaves, and orange fruits. The species is native to Brazil, Colombia, and Venezuela.

Bactris balanophora was described in 1869, and is listed as of Least Concern by the IUCN.

== Taxonomy ==
The species was described by Richard Spruce in 1869.

== Distribution ==
Bactris balanophora is native to the wet tropical biome of northern Brazil (Amazonas), Colombia (Amazonas and Vaupés), and Venezuela (Amazonas).

The species grows at elevations of up to 700 metres (2,300 ft).

== Description ==
Bactris balanophora is a shrub or tree that grows 1.5–7 metres (4.9–23.0 ft) high, and 2–3 centimetres (0.79–1.18 in) wide. It has black prickles that are up to 15 centimetres (5.9 in) long. The stems are in clumps of two to six.

The plant has five to eight leaves, which grow on 40–60 centimetres (1.3–2.0 ft) stems. The leaves are compound, and have fifteen to twenty-one pinnae on each side. The pinnae are linear-lanceolate, and irregularly clustered in groups of two to five.

The inflorescence stems are 9–11 centimetres (3.5–4.3 in) long, curved, and spiny. The male flowers are 2.5–4 millimetres (0.098–0.157 in) long, and have 1–1.5 millimetres (0.039–0.059 in) long sepal lobes. The petals of the male flowers have six stamens. The female flowers are up to 3 millimetres (0.12 in) long, and have a cup-shaped calyx, which is around 0.8 millimetres (0.031 in) long. The corolla is tube-shaped, and up to 3 millimetres (0.12 in) long.

The fruits are 1.3–1.7 centimetres (0.51–0.67 in) long, 7–8 millimetres (0.28–0.31 in) wide, ovoid or obovoid, and orange when mature. The epicarp is smooth, the mesocarp is starchy, and the endocarp is obovoid.

== Ecology ==
Bactris balanophora is eaten by the red acouchi and red-rumped agouti.

== Conservation ==
In 2022, the IUCN assessed Bactris balanophora as of Least Concern.

== Uses ==
Bactris balanophora is used for food, medicine, and poison.

== Nomenclature ==
In Spanish, the species is known as Chontilla or Chontaduro Falso.
