= Bactris elegans =

Scientific classification
- Kingdom: Plantae
- Clade: Tracheophytes
- Clade: Angiosperms
- Clade: Monocots
- Clade: Commelinids
- Order: Arecales
- Family: Arecaceae
- Genus: Bactris
- Species: B. elegans

Binomial name
- Bactris elegans Barb.Rodr. & Trail

Synonyms
- Bactris elegantissima Burret; Bactris elegans hort. ex Schaedtler

Species of palm

Bactris elegans is a species of palms which is native to South America (Bolivia, Brazil, Colombia, French Guiana, Guyana and Suriname).
