= Bactris setiflora =

Conservation status
- Endangered (IUCN 3.1)

Scientific classification
- Kingdom: Plantae
- Clade: Tracheophytes
- Clade: Angiosperms
- Clade: Monocots
- Clade: Commelinids
- Order: Arecales
- Family: Arecaceae
- Genus: Bactris
- Species: B. setiflora

Binomial name
- Bactris setiflora Burret

Species of palm

Bactris setiflora is a species of palm tree. It is endemic to Ecuador, where it is known only from Pastaza Province. It is threatened by deforestation.
