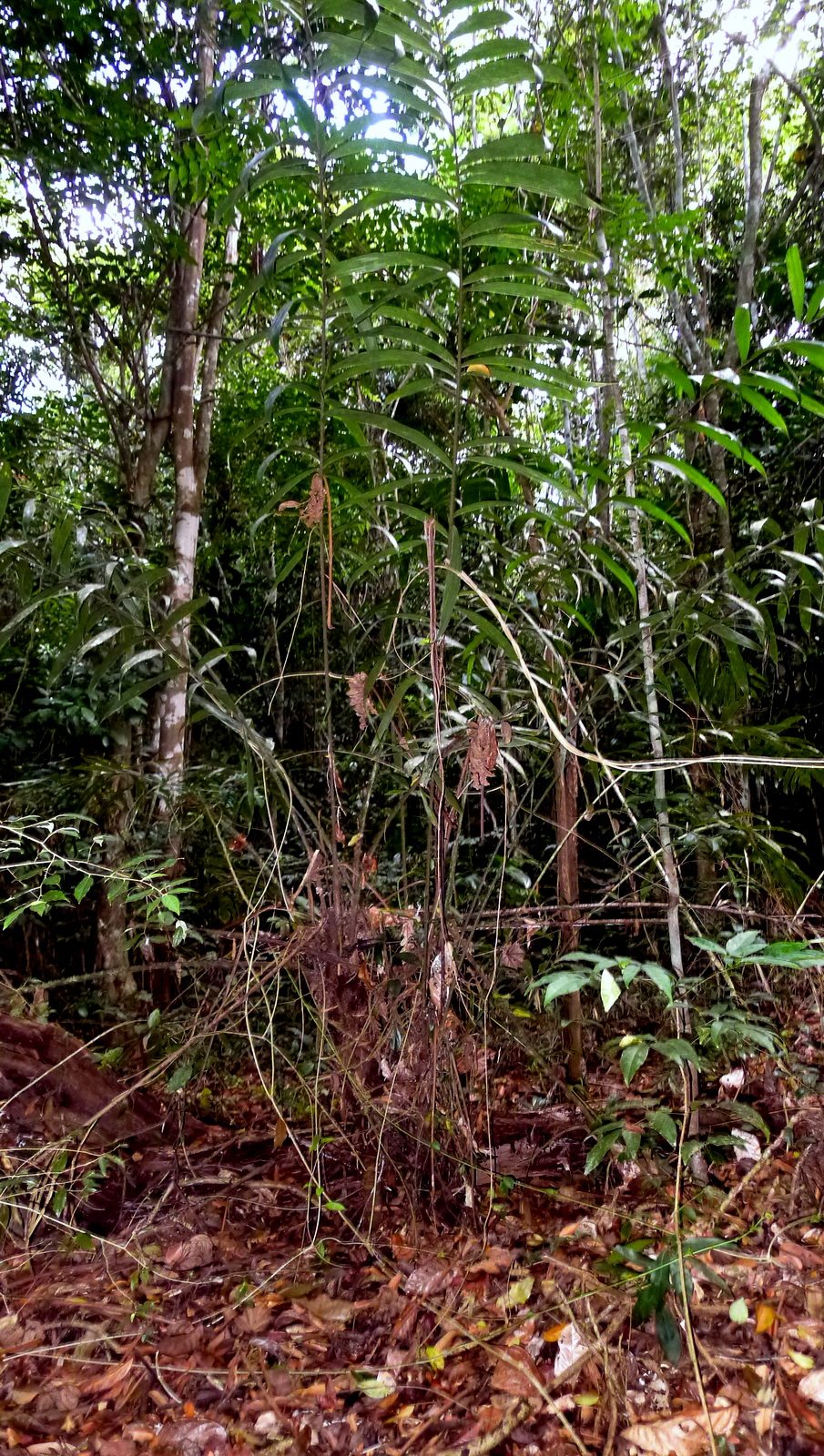
- Bactris acanthocarpa var. exscapa

Conservation status
- Least Concern (IUCN 3.1)

Scientific classification
- Kingdom: Plantae
- Clade: Embryophytes
- Clade: Tracheophytes
- Clade: Angiosperms
- Clade: Monocots
- Clade: Commelinids
- Order: Arecales
- Family: Arecaceae
- Genus: Bactris
- Species: B. acanthocarpa

Binomial name
- Bactris acanthocarpa Mart.

Varieties
- Bactris acanthocarpa var. acanthocarpa; Bactris acanthocarpa var. exscapa Barb.Rodr.; Bactris acanthocarpa var. intermedia A.J.Hend.; Bactris acanthocarpa var. trailiana (Barb.Rodr.) A.J.Hend.

= Bactris acanthocarpa =

Species of flowering plant

Bactris acanthocarpa is a species of flowering plant in the family Arecaceae. It is a shrub with compound leaves, and orange to red fruits. The species is native to South America, and was described in 1826.

Bactris acanthocarpa is used for food and medicine, and is listed as of Least Concern by the IUCN.

== Taxonomy ==
The species was described by Carl Friedrich Philipp von Martius in 1826. Four varieties are recognised:

- Bactris acanthocarpa var. acanthocarpa - native to north-east and south-east Brazil
- Bactris acanthocarpa var. exscapa Barb.Rodr. - native to Bolivia, Brazil (north and north-east), Colombia, Ecuador, Guyana, Peru, and Venezuela
- Bactris acanthocarpa var. intermedia A.J.Hend. - native to north Brazil, French Guiana, and Suriname
- Bactris acanthocarpa var. trailiana (Barb.Rodr.) A.J.Hend. - native to Bolivia, north Brazil, Colombia, and Venezuela

== Distribution ==
Bactris acanthocarpa is native to the seasonally dry tropical biome of Bolivia, Brazil (north, north-east, and south-east), Colombia, Ecuador, French Guiana, Guyana, Peru, Suriname, and Venezuela. The species grows in lowland forests, on non-inundated soils, at elevations of up to 1,000 metres (3,300 ft).

== Description ==
Bactris acanthocarpa is a shrub. The stems are solitary, or in clumps of two to five. The stems are 0.1–1.5 metres (0.33–4.92 ft) tall, 3–6 centimetres (1.2–2.4 in) wide, and sometimes spiny.

Each plant has five to fifteen compound leaves, which have scattered black spines. The leaves have twelve to thirty-three pinnae on each side, which are arranged in clusters or two to four. The leaf stems are 0.4–1.7 metres (1.3–5.6 ft) long.

The inflorescences grow on 10–20 centimetres (3.9–7.9 in) stems. The male flowers are deciduous, and up to 3 millimetres (0.12 in) long. The male flowers have sepals with 0.5–1 millimetre (0.020–0.039 in) long lobes, 2.5–3 millimetres (0.098–0.118 in) long petals, and six stamens. The female flowers are 2–3 millimetres (0.079–0.118 in) long, and have an urn-shaped, 1–3 millimetres (0.039–0.118 in) long calyx. The corolla of the female flowers is 2–4 millimetres (0.079–0.157 in) long.

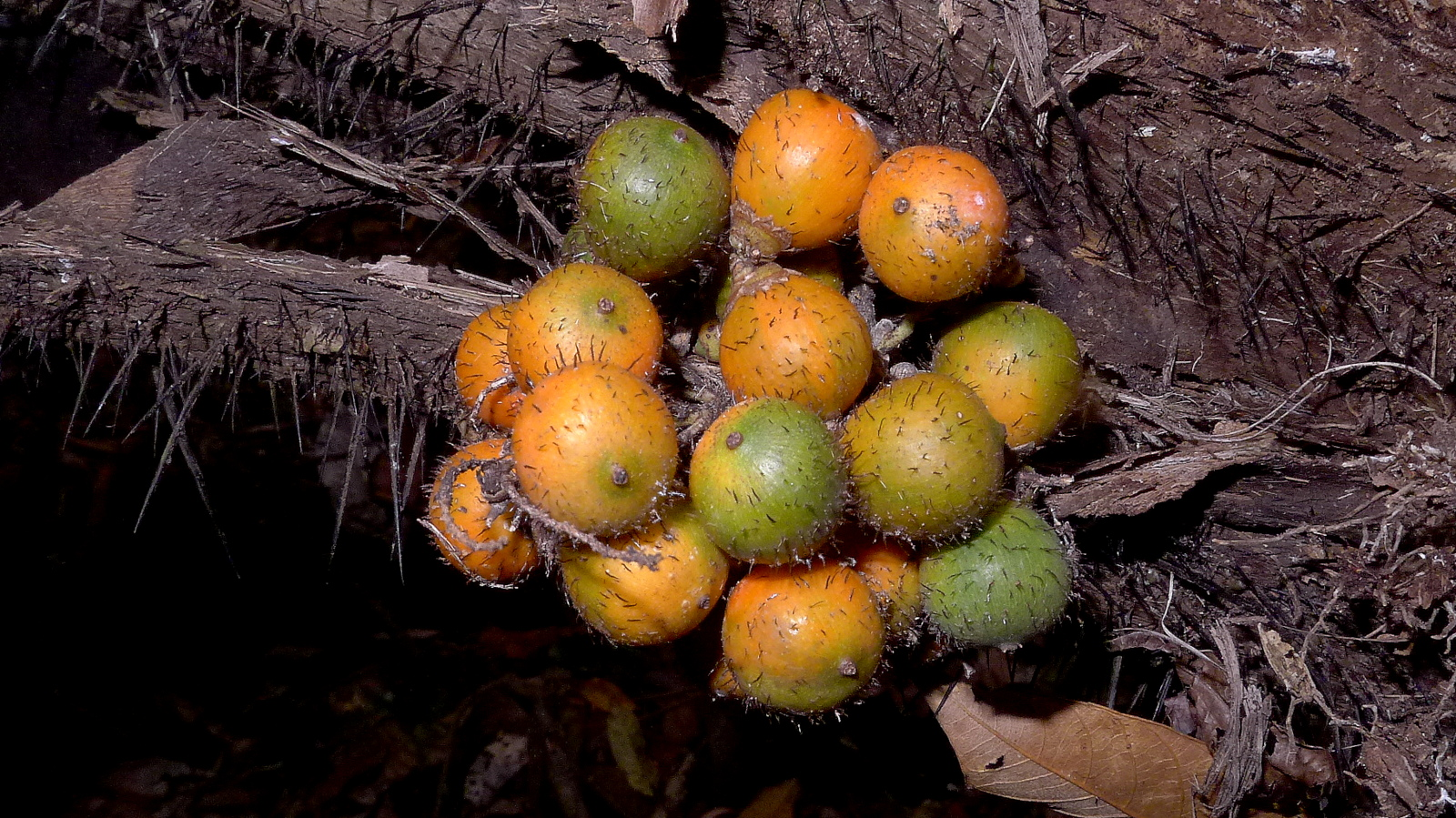
Bactris acanthocarpa has spiny fruits.

The fruits are obovoid, 1–2.3 centimetres (0.39–0.91 in) wide, orange to red in colour, and have deciduous spines. The epicarp is spiny, the mesocarp is starchy, and the endocarp is obovoid.

== Uses ==
Bactris acanthocarpa is used for animal food. The mesocarp of the fruit is used to make medicine, and the endocarps are used as beads.

== Ecology ==
Bactris acanthocarpa is eaten by the Brazilian squirrel and the Black-rumped agouti.

== Conservation ==
In 2018, the IUCN assessed Bactris acanthocarpa as of Least Concern. The population is large, and faces no major threats.

== Nomenclature ==
In Portuguese, the species is known as brejaubinha, dendê-de-urubu, mane-velho-roxo, marajá, or maraial. In Spanish, it is known as Espina, Chontilla, Chontaduro de los Peces, or Chontaduro de Monte.
