= Bactris corossilla =

Conservation status
- Least Concern (IUCN 3.1)

Scientific classification
- Kingdom: Plantae
- Clade: Tracheophytes
- Clade: Angiosperms
- Clade: Monocots
- Clade: Commelinids
- Order: Arecales
- Family: Arecaceae
- Genus: Bactris
- Species: B. corossilla

Binomial name
- Bactris corossilla H.Karst.

Synonyms
- Bactris corazillo H.Wendl.; Bactris cuesco Engel; Bactris duidae Steyerm.; Bactris duplex H.E.Moore; Bactris venezuelensis Steyerm.

Species of flowering plant

Bactris corossilla is a species of flowering plant in the family Arecaceae. It is a shrub or tree with spiny stems, pinnate leaves, and purple or black fruits. The species is native to south America.

Bactris corossilla was described in 1857, and is listed as of Least Concern by the IUCN.

== Taxonomy ==
The species was described by Gustav Karl Wilhelm Hermann Karsten in 1857.

== Distribution ==
Bactris corossilla is native to the wet tropical biome of Bolivia, northern Brazil, Colombia, Ecuador, Peru, and Venezuela. It grows on well-drained slopes, at elevations of up to 1,400 metres (4,600 ft).

== Description ==
Bactris corossilla is a shrub or tree. The stems are spiny, 2–4 metres (6.6–13.1 ft) tall, 3–4 centimetres (1.2–1.6 in) wide, sometimes form large clumps, or are occasionally solitary.

The plant has five to twelve leaves, which have clustered black or brown spines that are up to 5 centimetres (2.0 in) long. The leaves have three to eighteen irregularly clustered pinnae. The leaf stem is 20–80 centimetres (7.9–31.5 in) long.

The inflorescence stems are 11–25 centimetres (4.3–9.8 in) long, curved, and spiny. The flowers are 5–6 millimetres (0.20–0.24 in) long. The male flowers have 1.5–2 millimetres (0.059–0.079 in) long sepal lobes, and six stamens. The female flowers have a tube-shaped, 5–6 millimetres (0.20–0.24 in) long calyx, and a tube-shaped, 3–4 millimetres (0.12–0.16 in) long corolla.

The fruits are 2–2.5 centimetres (0.79–0.98 in) long, 1.7–2 centimetres (0.67–0.79 in) wide, and ripen from green to purple or black. The mesocarp is thin, and the endocarp is turbinate.

== Uses ==
Bactris corossilla is used for human and animal food, and in medicine.

== Conservation ==
In 2018, the IUCN assessed Bactris corossilla as of Least Concern. The population is large, and faces no major threats.
