= Bactris faucium =

Conservation status
- Endangered (IUCN 3.1)

Scientific classification
- Kingdom: Plantae
- Clade: Tracheophytes
- Clade: Angiosperms
- Clade: Monocots
- Clade: Commelinids
- Order: Arecales
- Family: Arecaceae
- Genus: Bactris
- Species: B. faucium

Binomial name
- Bactris faucium Mart.

Species of flowering plant

Bactris faucium is a species of flowering plant in the family Arecaceae. It is a shrub with spiny leaves and purple or black fruits. The species is native to Bolivia.

Bactris faucium was described in 1844, and is listed as Endangered by the IUCN.

== Taxonomy ==
The species was described by Carl Friedrich Philipp von Martius in 1844.

== Distribution ==
Bactris faucium is native to the wet tropical biome of Bolivia (Cochabamba, La Paz, and Santa Cruz). The species grows at elevations of 250–630 metres (820–2,070 ft). Its extent of occurrence is around 86,214 square kilometres (33,287 sq mi).

Bactris faucium is adapted to shaded areas.

== Description ==
Bactris faucium is a shrub. The stems are 2–3 metres (6.6–9.8 ft) tall, and 0.8–1.5 centimetres (0.31–0.59 in) wide.

The plant has five to ten leaves. The leaves have scattered dark brown spines that are up to 6 centimetres (2.4 in) long. The leaves are simple, or have two to fifteen pinnae on each side. The leaf stems are 17–25 centimetres (6.7–9.8 in) long.

The inflorescence stem is straight 2–4.5 centimetres (0.79–1.77 in) long. The male flowers are up to 6.5 millimetres (0.26 in) long, and have sepal lobes that are up to 1 millimetre (0.039 in) long. The male flowers have six stamens. The female flowers are 3.5–4 millimetres (0.14–0.16 in) long, and have a spiny, tube-shaped calyx that is up to 3.5 millimetres (0.14 in) long. The corolla of female flowers is spiny, tube-shaped, and up to 4 millimetres (0.16 in) long.

The fruits are globose to obovoid, up to 2 centimetres (0.79 in) wide, and purple or black. The mesocarp is juicy.

== Conservation ==
In 2023, the IUCN assessed Bactris faucium as Endangered. It is threatened by habitat fragmentation and road construction.
