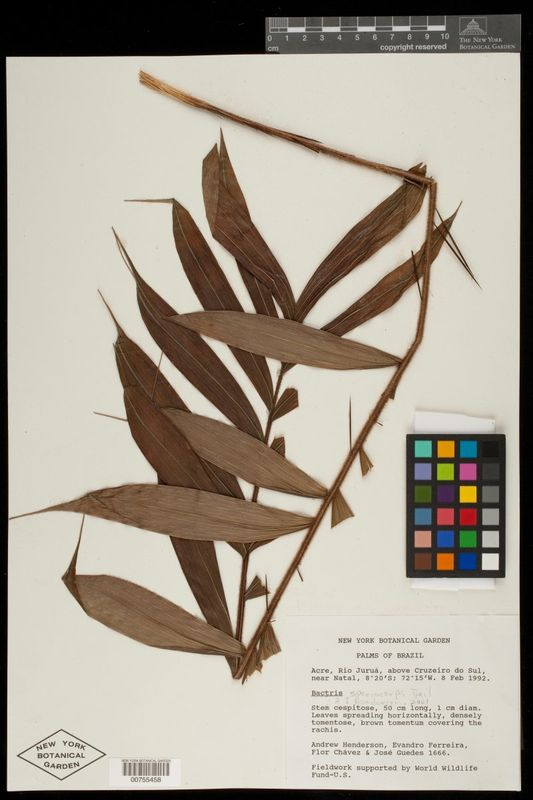

Conservation status
- Least Concern (IUCN 3.1)

Scientific classification
- Kingdom: Plantae
- Clade: Embryophytes
- Clade: Tracheophytes
- Clade: Spermatophytes
- Clade: Angiosperms
- Clade: Monocots
- Clade: Commelinids
- Order: Arecales
- Family: Arecaceae
- Genus: Bactris
- Species: B. sphaerocarpa

Binomial name
- Bactris sphaerocarpa Trail

Synonyms
- Bactris tomentosa var. sphaerocarpa (Trail) A.J.Hend.; Bactris sphaerocarpa var. ensifolia Trail; Bactris sphaerocarpa var. minor Trail; Bactris sphaerocarpa var. pinnatisecta (Trail) A.D.Hawkes; Bactris sphaerocarpa subsp. pinnatisecta Trail; Bactris sphaerocarpa var. platyphylla Trail; Bactris sphaerocarpa var. schizophylla Drude

= Bactris sphaerocarpa =

Species of flowering plant

Bactris sphaerocarpa is a species of flowering plant in the family Arecaceae. It is a shrub or palm tree with black prickles, nine to thirteen leaves, and black to purplish fruits. The species is native to Brazil, Colombia, and Peru.

Bactris sphaerocarpa was described in 1877, and is listed as of Least Concern by the IUCN.

== Taxonomy ==
The species was described by James W. H. Trail in 1877.

== Distribution ==
Bactris sphaerocarpa is native to the wet tropical biome of Colombia (Amazonas), Peru (Loreto and Madre de Dios), and north-west Brazil (Acre and Amazonas). It grows in lowland rainforests, at elevations of 150–400 metres (490–1,310 ft).

== Description ==
Bactris sphaerocarpa is a shrub or palm tree. The stem is up to 2 metres (6.6 ft) high, and 0.8–1.5 centimetres (0.31–0.59 in) wide. The plant has black prickles that are up to 3 centimetres (1.2 in) long.

The plant has nine to thirteen leaves, which are pinnate, or have smooth edges. There are two to seven pinnae on each side. The leaves are up to 50 centimetres (1.6 ft) long, and 15 centimetres (0.49 ft) wide. The leaf stems are 10–28 centimetres (3.9–11.0 in) long.

The flower stems are around 6 centimetres (2.4 in) long, and lack spines. The male flowers are 5–6 millimetres (0.20–0.24 in) long, and have six stamens. The sepal lobes are 1–2 millimetres (0.039–0.079 in) long. The female flowers are 3.5–4.5 millimetres (0.14–0.18 in) long. The calyx and corolla are 3–4 millimetres (0.12–0.16 in) long, and tube-shaped.

The fruits are ovoid, black to purplish, up to 2.5 centimetres (0.98 in) long, and up to 1.7 centimetres (0.67 in) wide. The epicarp is smooth, the mesocarp is juicy, and the endocarp is turbinate.

== Uses ==
Bactris sphaerocarpa is used for food.

== Conservation ==
In 2022, the IUCN assessed Bactris sphaerocarpa as of Least Concern.

== Nomenclature ==
In Portuguese, the species is known as Marajá or Marajazinha. In Spanish, the species is known as Ñejilla.
