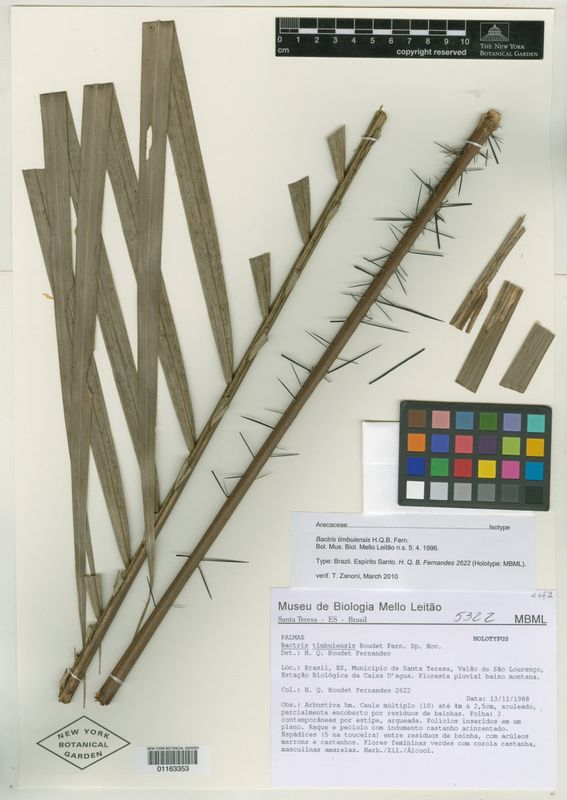

Conservation status
- Endangered (IUCN 3.1)

Scientific classification
- Kingdom: Plantae
- Clade: Embryophytes
- Clade: Tracheophytes
- Clade: Spermatophytes
- Clade: Angiosperms
- Clade: Monocots
- Clade: Commelinids
- Order: Arecales
- Family: Arecaceae
- Genus: Bactris
- Species: B. timbuiensis

Binomial name
- Bactris timbuiensis H.Q.B.Fern.

= Bactris timbuiensis =

Species of flowering plant

Bactris timbuiensis is a species of flowering plant in the family Arecaceae. It is a shrub or tree with black and brown spines, and orange-red fruits. The species is endemic to Brazil.

Bactris timbuiensis was described in 1996, and is listed as Endangered by the IUCN.

== Taxonomy ==
The species was described by Helio de Queiroz Boudet Fernandes in 1996.

== Distribution ==
Bactris timbuiensis is native to the wet tropical biome of Espírito Santo, south-east Brazil. It grows on slopes in coastal forests, at elevations of 600–900 metres (2,000–3,000 ft). The species' estimated extent of occurrence is around 31 square kilometres (12 sq mi).

== Description ==
Bactris timbuiensis is a shrub or tree. The stems are spiny, up to 5 metres (16 ft) tall, and are 2.5–3.7 centimetres (0.98–1.46 in) wide.

The plant has three to five leaves, which have cylindrical black and brown spines up to 8 centimetres (3.1 in) long. The leaves have thirty-three to forty-six regularly arranged pinnae on each side. The leaf stem is 32–83 centimetres (13–33 in) long.

The flower stems are spiny, curved, flattened, and up to 9 centimetres (3.5 in) long. The male flowers are 3.5–4.5 millimetres (0.14–0.18 in) long, and have six stamens. The sepal lobes are 1.2–1.8 millimetres (0.047–0.071 in) long. The petals are 3.8–4 millimetres (0.15–0.16 in) long. The female flowers are 3.8–4.8 millimetres (0.15–0.19 in) long. The calyx is cup-shaped, and 0.9–1.2 millimetres (0.035–0.047 in) long. The corolla is tube-shaped, 2.4–3.3 millimetres (0.094–0.130 in) long, and covered in brown spines.

The fruits are obovoid, orange-red, and 1.3–1.5 centimetres (0.51–0.59 in) wide. The mesocarp is starchy and the endocarp is obovoid. The epicarp is smooth.

== Conservation ==
In 2009, the IUCN assessed Bactris timbuiensis as Endangered.

== Nomenclature ==
In Portuguese, the species is known as tucunzinho or Timbuiensis.
