= Bactris charnleyae =

Conservation status
- Data Deficient (IUCN 3.1)

Scientific classification
- Kingdom: Plantae
- Clade: Tracheophytes
- Clade: Angiosperms
- Clade: Monocots
- Clade: Commelinids
- Order: Arecales
- Family: Arecaceae
- Genus: Bactris
- Species: B. charnleyae

Binomial name
- Bactris charnleyae de Nevers, A.J.Hend. & Grayum

Species of flowering plant

Bactris charnleyae is a species of flowering plant in the family Arecaceae. It is a shrub with yellow or orange fruits. The species is native to Panama and Colombia.

Bactris charnleyae was described in 1996, and is listed as Data Deficient by the IUCN.

== Taxonomy ==
Bactris charnleyae was described by Gregory Clark de Nevers, Andrew Henderson, and Michael Howard Grayum in 1996.

== Distribution ==
Bactris charnleyae is native to the wet tropical biome of Panama and Colombia. It grows at elevations of 20–300 metres (66–984 ft).

== Description ==
Bactris charnleyae is a shrub. The stems are 0.5–2 metres (20–79 in) tall, and 6–9 millimetres (0.24–0.35 in) wide. The plant has three to six leaves, which have 7–11 centimetres (2.8–4.3 in) long stems.

The inflorescence stem is 3–5 centimetres (1.2–2.0 in) long, spiny, and more or less straight. The female flowers are 2–3 millimetres (0.079–0.118 in) long. The calyx is cup-shaped, and around 0.5 millimetres (0.020 in) long. The corolla is tube shaped, and around 2 millimetres (0.079 in) long.

The fruits are yellow or orange. The mesocarp is starchy, and the endocarp is turbinate.

== Conservation ==
In 2020, the IUCN listed Bactris charnleyae as Data Deficient.
