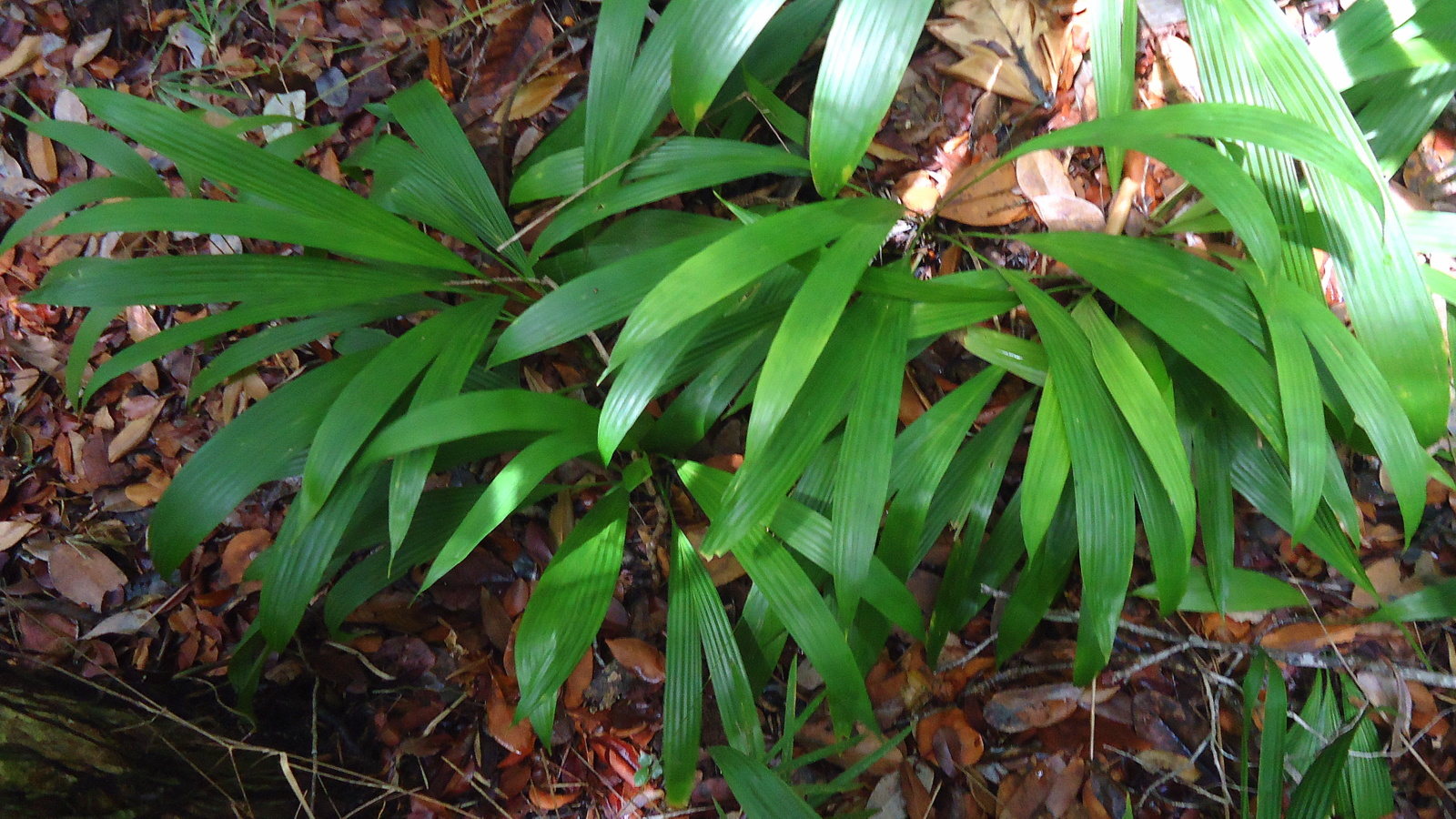
- Bactris hirta var. pectinata

Conservation status
- Least Concern (IUCN 3.1)

Scientific classification
- Kingdom: Plantae
- Clade: Embryophytes
- Clade: Tracheophytes
- Clade: Spermatophytes
- Clade: Angiosperms
- Clade: Monocots
- Clade: Commelinids
- Order: Arecales
- Family: Arecaceae
- Genus: Bactris
- Species: B. hirta

Binomial name
- Bactris hirta Mart.

Varieties
- Bactris hirta var. hirta; Bactris hirta var. jenmanii A.J.Hend.; Bactris hirta var. lakoi (Burret) A.J.Hend.; Bactris hirta var. pectinata (Mart.) Govaerts

Synonyms
- Amylocarpus hirtus (Mart.) Barb.Rodr.

= Bactris hirta =

Species of flowering plant

Bactris hirta is a species of flowering plant in the family Arecaceae. It is a shrub or tree, with black and brown spines, and red fruits.

Bactris hirta is native to South American rainforests, and was described in 1826. The IUCN lists the species as of least concern.

== Taxonomy ==
Bactris hirta was described in 1826, by Carl Friedrich Philipp von Martius.

== Distribution ==
Bactris hirta is native to the wet tropical biome of South America (Bolivia, Brazil, Colombia, French Guiana, Guyana, Peru, Suriname, and Venezuela). It grows in lowland rainforests, on non-inundated soils.

The species occurs at elevations of 0–800 metres (0–2,625 ft).

== Description ==
Bactris hirta is a shrub or palm tree, that grows up to 3 metres (9.8 ft) high. It has black and brown spines up to 4 centimetres (1.6 in) long.

The leaves are simple, and the leaf edges are smooth. The leaves are 23–80 centimetres (0.75–2.62 ft) long, and 9–20 centimetres (0.30–0.66 ft) wide.

The inflorescences have 3–21 centimetres (1.2–8.3 in) long stems, which may or may not have spines. The male flowers are 3–4 millimetres (0.12–0.16 in) long, and the female flowers are 2–3.5 millimetres (0.079–0.138 in) long. The calyx is 0.5–1 millimetre (0.020–0.039 in) long. The corolla is a 2–3.5 millimetres (0.079–0.138 in) long tube, covered in long brown hairs.

The fruits are round, 0.5–1 centimetre (0.20–0.39 in) wide, and can be orange, red, or black in colour.

== Ecology ==
The South American tapir eats Bactris hirta.

== Conservation ==
In 2018, Bactris hirta was listed as a species of least concern on the International Union for the Conservation of Nature's Red List. The species faces no major threats. Due to its wide distribution, the population is assumed to be large.

== Uses ==
Bactris hirta is used for food.

== Nomenclature ==
In Portuguese, Bactris hirta is known as aricanga-falsa, marajá, tucum-mirim, or ubimrana.
