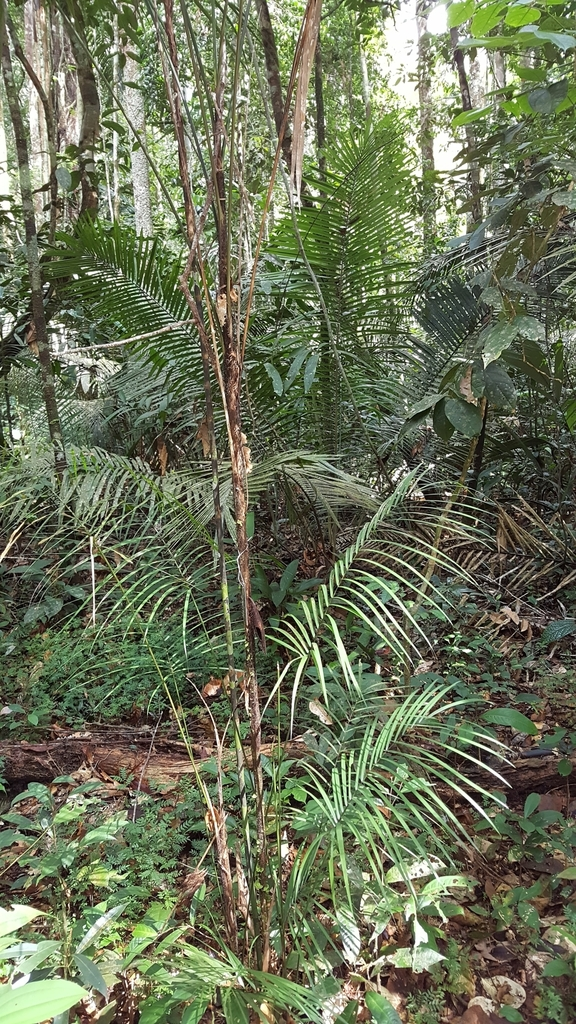

Scientific classification
- Kingdom: Plantae
- Clade: Embryophytes
- Clade: Tracheophytes
- Clade: Spermatophytes
- Clade: Angiosperms
- Clade: Monocots
- Clade: Commelinids
- Order: Arecales
- Family: Arecaceae
- Genus: Bactris
- Species: B. syagroides

Binomial name
- Bactris syagroides Trail

Synonyms
- Amylocarpus syagroides (Barb.Rodr. & Trail) Barb.Rodr.; Bactris cyagroides Barb.Rodr.; Bactris multiramosa Burret

= Bactris syagroides =

Species of flowering plant

Bactris syagroides is a species of flowering plant in the family Arecaceae. It is a shrub with five to eight leaves and yellow-orange fruits. The species is native to Brazil, and was described in 1877.

== Taxonomy ==
The species was described by James W. H. Trail in 1877.

== Distribution ==
Bactris syagroides is native to the wet tropical biome of northern Brazil (Amazonas and Pará). It grows in lowland rainforests.

== Description ==
Bactris syagroides is a shrub. It grows 0.6–1.5 metres (2.0–4.9 ft) high, and 0.8–2 centimetres (0.31–0.79 in) wide. The stems lack spines, and are covered in decaying leaf bases.

The plant has five to eight leaves, with scattered black spines that grow up to 1 centimetre (0.39 in) long. The leaf stems are 45–90 centimetres (1.48–2.95 ft) long. The leaves are compound, and have thirty to thirty-eight regularly arranged pinnae on each side.

The flower stems are spiny, and up to 4.5 centimetres (1.8 in) long. The male flowers are 3–4 millimetres (0.12–0.16 in) long, and have four to six stamens. The sepal lobes are 0.5–1 millimetre (0.020–0.039 in) long. The female flowers are 2–3 millimetres (0.079–0.118 in) long. The calyx is cup-shaped, and 0.3–1 millimetre (0.012–0.039 in) long. The corolla is tube-shaped, and 2–3 millimetres (0.079–0.118 in) long.

The fruits are round, yellow-orange, and 6–8 millimetres (0.24–0.31 in) in diameter. The mesocarp is starchy. The endocarp is pitted and obovoid.

== Etymology ==
Bactris syagroides is named for its resemblance to Syagrus cocoides.
