= Bactris pickelii =

Conservation status
- Vulnerable (IUCN 2.3)

Scientific classification
- Kingdom: Plantae
- Clade: Tracheophytes
- Clade: Angiosperms
- Clade: Monocots
- Clade: Commelinids
- Order: Arecales
- Family: Arecaceae
- Genus: Bactris
- Species: B. pickelii

Binomial name
- Bactris pickelii Burret

Species of palm

Bactris pickelii is a species of flowering plant in the family Arecaceae. It is found only in Brazil. It is threatened by habitat loss.
