= Bactris longiseta =

Conservation status
- Endangered (IUCN 3.1)

Scientific classification
- Kingdom: Plantae
- Clade: Tracheophytes
- Clade: Angiosperms
- Clade: Monocots
- Clade: Commelinids
- Order: Arecales
- Family: Arecaceae
- Genus: Bactris
- Species: B. longiseta

Binomial name
- Bactris longiseta H.Wendl. ex Burret

Species of palm

Bactris longiseta, the huiscoyol, is a species of flowering plant in the family Arecaceae. It is found in Costa Rica and Nicaragua around Estero Real Natural Reserve. It is threatened by habitat loss.
