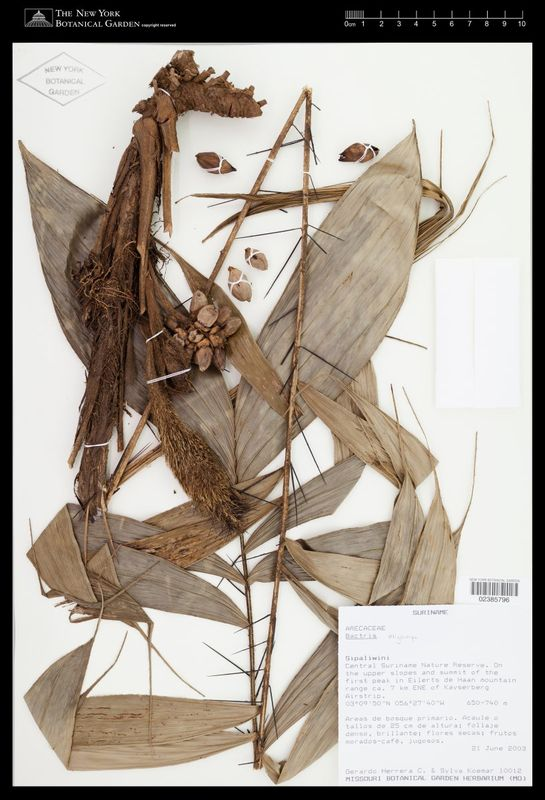

Scientific classification
- Kingdom: Plantae
- Clade: Embryophytes
- Clade: Tracheophytes
- Clade: Spermatophytes
- Clade: Angiosperms
- Clade: Monocots
- Clade: Commelinids
- Order: Arecales
- Family: Arecaceae
- Genus: Bactris
- Species: B. oligocarpa

Binomial name
- Bactris oligocarpa Barb.Rodr.

Synonyms
- Pyrenoglyphis oligocarpa (Barb.Rodr.) Burret; Bactris oligocarpa var. brachycaulis' Trail

= Bactris oligocarpa =

Species of flowering plant

Bactris oligocarpa is a species of flowering plant in the family Arecaceae. It is a small palm tree with compound leaves, black spines, and ovoid, black to purple fruits. The species is native to South America, and was described in 1875.

== Taxonomy ==
The species was described by João Barbosa Rodrigues in 1875.

== Distribution ==
The species is native to the wet tropical biome of French Guiana, Suriname, and northern Brazil. It grows in lowland rainforests, at elevations of 50–700 metres (160–2,300 ft).

== Description ==
Bactris oligocarpa is a small shrub or palm tree, that grows 0.2–1.5 metres (0.66–4.92 ft) high. The stems are usually solitary, and 0.8–1 centimetre (0.31–0.39 in) wide. The plant has black prickles, which are up to 3 centimetres (1.2 in) long.

The plant has four to fifteen compound leaves, with segments in two to seven pairs. The leaves have 22–50 centimetres (8.7–19.7 in) stems. The flowers grow on 6–13 centimetres (2.4–5.1 in) stems, which lack spines. The male flowers are 5–6 millimetres (0.20–0.24 in) long, and have six stamens. The lobes of the sepals are around 2 millimetres (0.079 in) long. The petals are 5–6 millimetres (0.20–0.24 in) long. The calyx is tubular, and up to 3 millimetres (0.12 in) long.

The fruits are ovoid, 1.7–2 centimetres (0.67–0.79 in) long, 1–1.5 centimetres (0.39–0.59 in) wide, black to purple, and have a smooth outer layer. The mesocarp is juicy, and the endocarp is ellipsoid.

== Names ==
In Portuguese, Bactris oligocarpa is known as marajá.
