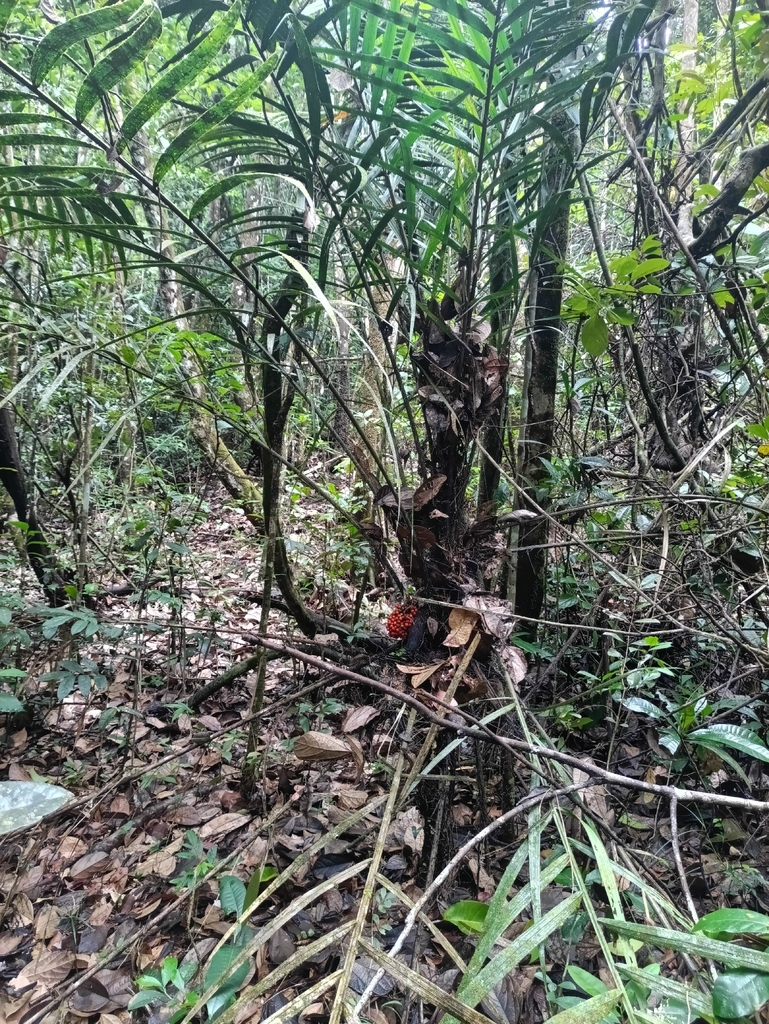

Scientific classification
- Kingdom: Plantae
- Clade: Embryophytes
- Clade: Tracheophytes
- Clade: Spermatophytes
- Clade: Angiosperms
- Clade: Monocots
- Clade: Commelinids
- Order: Arecales
- Family: Arecaceae
- Genus: Bactris
- Species: B. rhaphidacantha

Binomial name
- Bactris rhaphidacantha Wess.Boer

= Bactris rhaphidacantha =

Species of flowering plant

Bactris rhaphidacantha is a species of flowering plant in the family Arecaceae. It is a shrub or palm tree with pinnate leaves, branching inflorescences, and orange-red fruits. The species is native to South America, and was described in 1965.

== Taxonomy ==
The species was described by Jan Gerard Wessels Boer in 1965.

== Distribution ==
Bactris rhaphidacantha is native to the wet tropical biome of northern Brazil (Amapá), French Guiana, and Suriname. It grows at elevations of 100–550 metres (330–1,800 ft), mostly on well-drained slopes.

== Description ==
Bactris rhaphidacantha is a subshrub, shrub, or palm tree. The stems are 0.3–1.5 metres (0.98–4.92 ft) long, and 5–8 centimetres (2.0–3.1 in) wide. The stems can be solitary, or have up to three stems. The stems lack prickles, or have a few spines between the leaf attachment points.

The plant has eight to sixteen leaves, which form a funnel-shaped crown. The leaf stem is 0.5–1.5 metres (1.6–4.9 ft) long. The leaves are pinnate. There are twenty-five to fifty-four pairs of pinnae, which are regularly arranged.

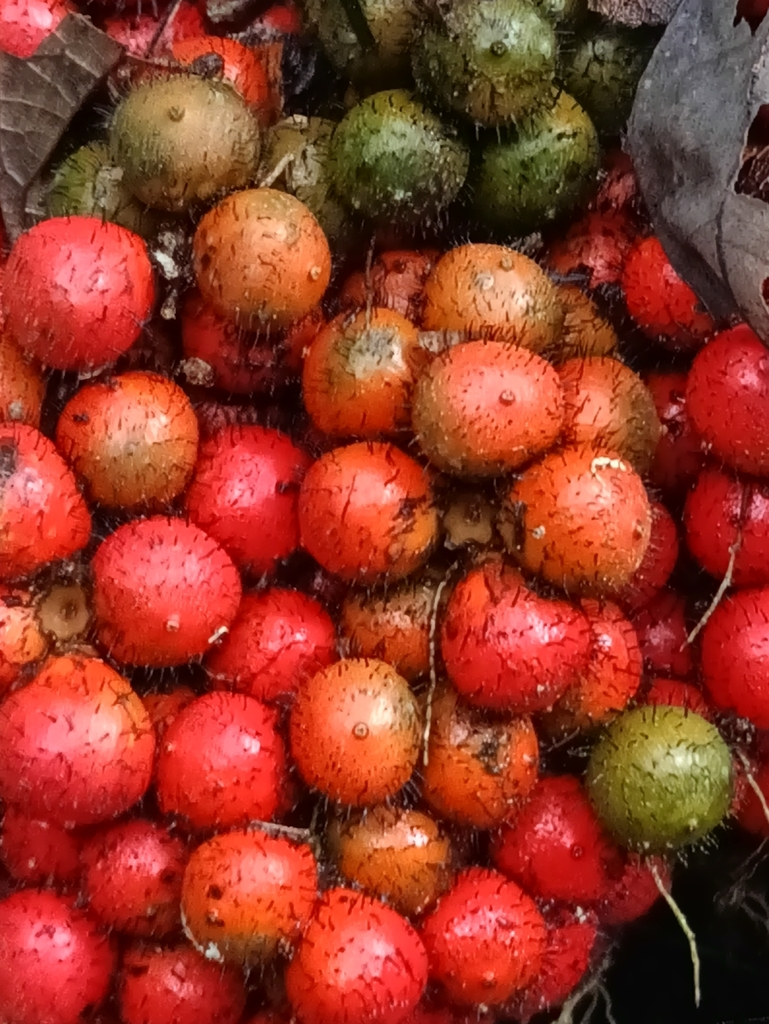
The fruits are orange-red, and spiny.

The inflorescences are branching, and have curved, 10–20 centimetres (3.9–7.9 in) long stems. The male flowers are around 2 millimetres (0.079 in) long, and have sepal lobes that are around 1.5 millimetres (0.059 in) long. The male flowers have four to seven stamens, and petals that are around 2 millimetres (0.079 in) long.

The female flowers are up to 3 millimetres (0.12 in) long. The calyx is cup-shaped, and 1.5–3 millimetres (0.059–0.118 in) long. The corolla is cup-shaped and 2–3 millimetres (0.079–0.118 in) long.

The fruits are 1–1.2 centimetres (0.39–0.47 in) wide, obovoid, orange-red, and have short black spines. The mesocarp is starchy, and the endocarp is turbinate.

== Nomenclature ==
In Portuguese, the species is known as marajá.
