= Bactris simplicifrons =

Scientific classification
- Kingdom: Plantae
- Clade: Tracheophytes
- Clade: Angiosperms
- Clade: Monocots
- Clade: Commelinids
- Order: Arecales
- Family: Arecaceae
- Genus: Bactris
- Species: B. simplicifrons

Binomial name
- Bactris simplicifrons Mart.

Species of palm

Bactris simplicifrons is a small (0.5–2 m tall, 0.3–1 cm in diameter) palm which is found in Trinidad and Tobago, Guyana, Suriname, French Guiana, Brazil, Colombia, Ecuador, Peru and Bolivia.

Unlike most other species of Bactris, B. simplicifrons is usually non-spiny, or only spiny along the leaf margins. It also tends to have simple, rather than compound leaves.
