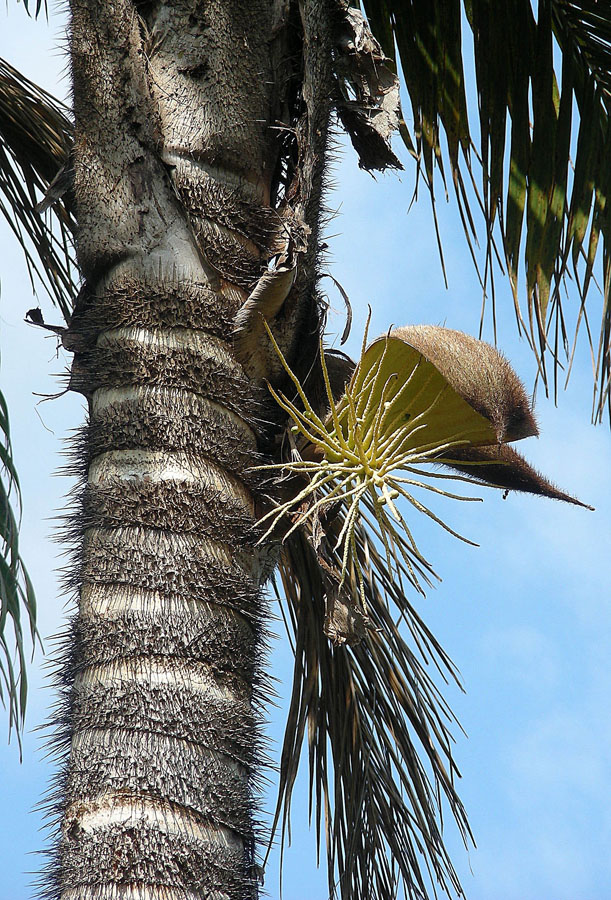

Conservation status
- Near Threatened (IUCN 2.3)

Scientific classification
- Kingdom: Plantae
- Clade: Tracheophytes
- Clade: Angiosperms
- Clade: Monocots
- Clade: Commelinids
- Order: Arecales
- Family: Arecaceae
- Genus: Bactris
- Species: B. setulosa

Binomial name
- Bactris setulosa H.Karst.

Synonyms
- Bactris bergantina Steyerm.; Bactris circularis L.H.Bailey; Bactris cuesa Crueg. ex Griseb.; Bactris cuvaro H.Karst.; Bactris falcata J.R.Johnst.; Bactris kalbreyeri Burret; Bactris sworderiana Becc.

= Bactris setulosa =

Species of palm

Bactris setulosa is a species of flowering plant in the family Arecaceae. It is a medium-sized (5–10 m tall, 6–10 cm in diameter) spiny palm which is found in Colombia, Venezuela, Ecuador, Peru, Trinidad and Tobago and Suriname. It is one of the largest species of Bactris and is found at the highest elevations.
