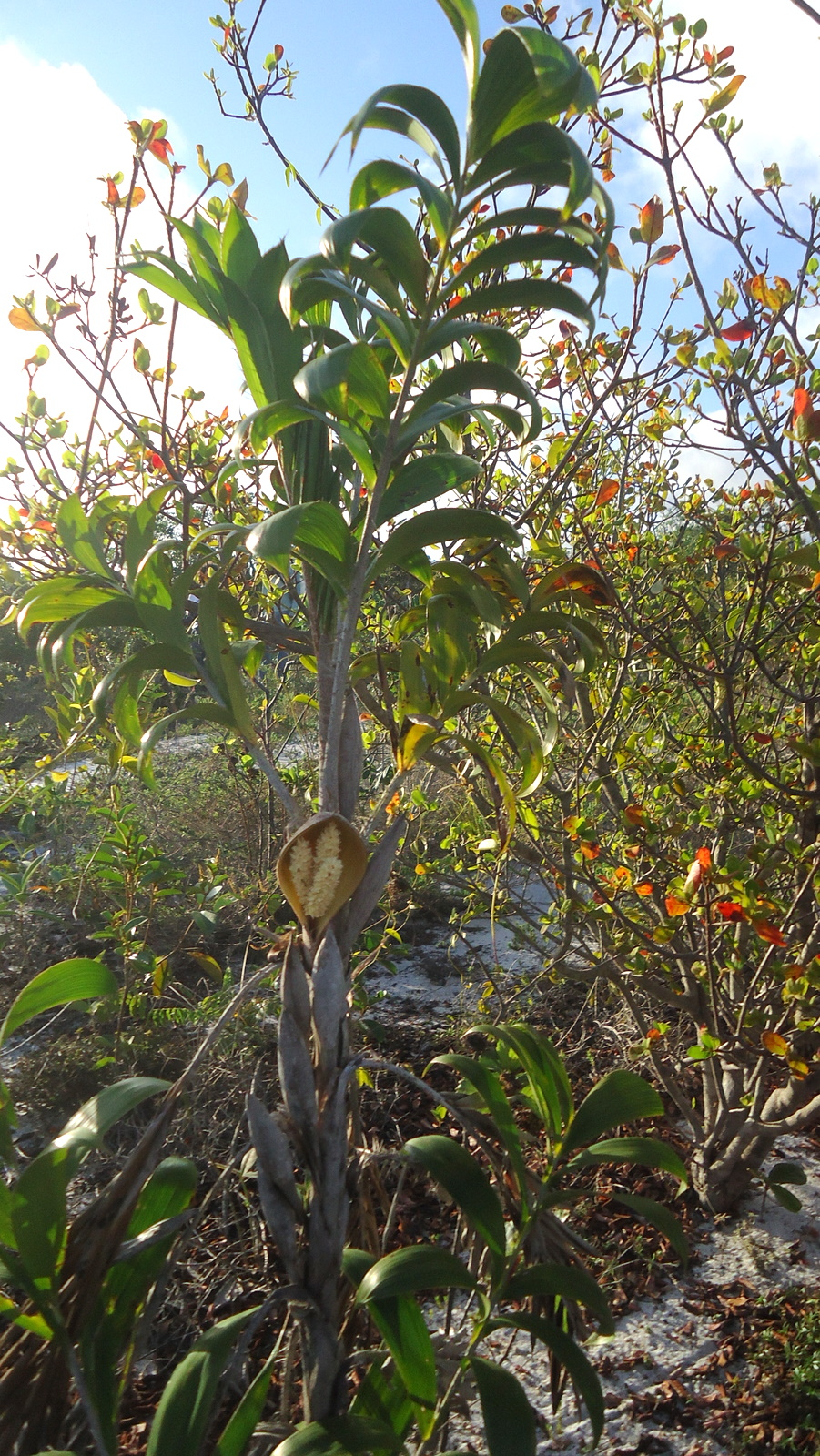

Scientific classification
- Kingdom: Plantae
- Clade: Embryophytes
- Clade: Tracheophytes
- Clade: Angiosperms
- Clade: Monocots
- Clade: Commelinids
- Order: Arecales
- Family: Arecaceae
- Genus: Bactris
- Species: B. soeiroana

Binomial name
- Bactris soeiroana Noblick ex A.J.Hend.

= Bactris soeiroana =

Species of flowering plant

Bactris soeiroana is a species of flowering plant in the family Arecaceae. It is a shrub or palm tree with brown and yellow prickles, segmented leaves, and yellow fruits. The species is endemic to Brazil, and was described in 2000.

== Taxonomy ==
Bactris soeiroana was described by Andrew Henderson in 2000. The name was previously published invalidly by Larry Ronald Noblick.

The type material was collected from Salvador, Bahia in 1988.

== Distribution ==
Bactris soeiroana is native to the seasonally dry tropical biome of north-east Bahia, Brazil. It grows in Restinga ecosystems, on sandy soil, near sea level.

== Description ==
Bactris soeiroana is a shrub or palm tree up to 2 metres (6.6 ft) high. The stems are 1–2 centimetres (0.39–0.79 in) wide, and usually covered in decaying leaf bases. The plant has brown and yellow prickles, which are up to 3 centimetres (1.2 in) long.

The plant has four to ten pinnate leaves, The leaves have irregularly clustered, elliptical segments, in eight to seventeen pairs. The leaf stems are 5–18 centimetres (2.0–7.1 in) long.

The flowers have 5–15 centimetres (2.0–5.9 in) stems, which are straight, and lack spines. The male flowers are up to 4.5 millimetres (0.18 in) long. The sepal lobes are 1–1.5 millimetres (0.039–0.059 in) long, and the petals are 2.5–4.5 millimetres (0.098–0.177 in) long. The male flowers have six or seven stamens.

The female flowers are up to 3 millimetres (0.12 in) long. The calyx is ring-shaped, and 1–2 millimetres (0.039–0.079 in) long. The corolla is tubular, and 2–3 millimetres (0.079–0.118 in) long.

The fruits are obovoid, around 1 centimetre (0.39 in) long and 1.5 centimetres (0.59 in) wide, yellow, and have a smooth epicarp.

== Nomenclature ==
In Portuguese, the species is known as jussa or tucum.
