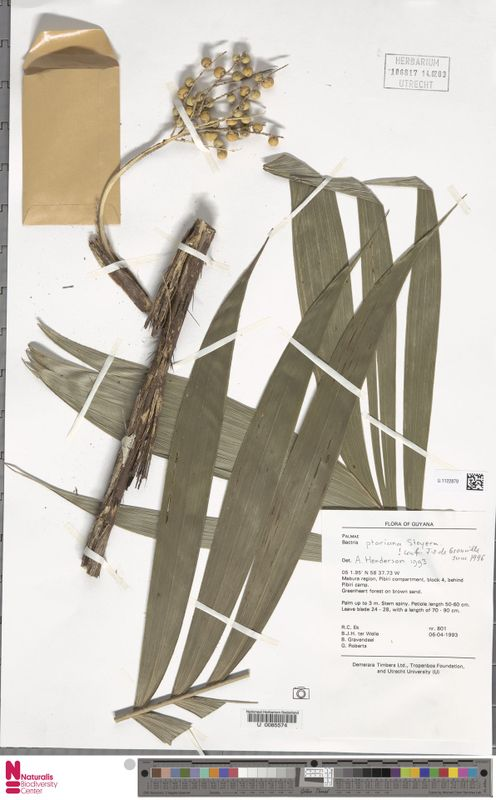

Conservation status
- Least Concern (IUCN 3.1)

Scientific classification
- Kingdom: Plantae
- Clade: Embryophytes
- Clade: Tracheophytes
- Clade: Spermatophytes
- Clade: Angiosperms
- Clade: Monocots
- Clade: Commelinids
- Order: Arecales
- Family: Arecaceae
- Genus: Bactris
- Species: B. ptariana

Binomial name
- Bactris ptariana Steyerm.

= Bactris ptariana =

Species of flowering plant

Bactris ptariana is a species of flowering plant in the family Arecaceae. It is a shrub or tree, with compound leaves, spiny stems, and bright orange fruits.

The species is native to Guyana and Venezuela. It was described in 1951, and is listed as of Least Concern by the International Union for Conservation of Nature.

== Taxonomy ==
The species was described by Julian Alfred Steyermark in 1951.

== Distribution ==
Bactris ptariana is native to the wet tropical biome of Guyana and southern Venezuela. It grows at elevations of 10–2,000 metres (33–6,562 ft). The species' estimated area of occurrence is 95,721 square kilometres (36,958 sq mi).

Bactris ptariana grows in forests, dwarf forests, or open areas near forest margins. It usually grows on white sand soils.

== Description ==
Bactris ptariana is a shrub or tree. The stems are 2–3 metres (6.6–9.8 ft) tall, and 3–5 centimetres (1.2–2.0 in) wide. The stems have spines.

The leaves are compound, and have fifteen to forty-seven segments (pinna) on each side. The pinnae are arranged in irregular clusters. The leaf stems are 15–40 centimetres (5.9–15.7 in) long.

The male flowers are 3–4 millimetres (0.12–0.16 in) long, and have six stamens. The female flowers are 3–3.5 millimetres (0.12–0.14 in) long. The sepal lobes are around 1 millimetre (0.039 in) long. The calyx is ring-shaped, and 0.5 millimetres (0.020 in) long. The corolla is cup-shaped, and 2–2.5 millimetres (0.079–0.098 in) long. The inflorescences are borne among the bases of leaves. The flower stems are 11–24 centimetres (4.3–9.4 in) long, and spiny.

The fruits are egg-shaped, bright orange or red, 0.7–1 centimetre (0.28–0.39 in) long, and 0.6–0.8 centimetres (0.24–0.31 in) wide. They sometimes have minute spines. The mesocarp is starchy. The endocarp is shaped like a spinning top.

== Conservation ==
In 2021, the IUCN assessed Bactris ptariana as of Least Concern. It is present in Venezuela's Canaima National Park.

== Nomenclature ==
In Spanish, the species is known as maswa.
