= Jean-Jacques de Granville =

Botanist and curator (1943–2022)

- Born: Jean-Jacques Douzal de Granville; 5 August 1943; Neuilly-sur-Seine, France
- Died: 13 December 2022 (aged 79); Cayenne, French Guiana
- Occupation(s): Botanist, museum curator

Jean-Jacques Douzal de Granville (5 August 1943 – 13 December 2022) was a French and French Guianan botanist, museum curator, and researcher. Granville specialized in the study of the palm trees and other flora of French Guiana, including four new palm species which he first described and introduced to science. He authored 271 scientific books, articles, journals and other publications, including the landmark Guide des Palmiers de Guyane (Guide To The Palms of Guyane), which was published in 2014. Granville also advocated for the creation of Guiana Amazonian Park, which was established in 2007 after decades of advocacy.

== Biography ==
Granville died in Cayenne, French Guiana, on 13 December 2022, at the age of 79. He was buried in the Cabassou cemetery in Cayenne on 19 December 2022.
