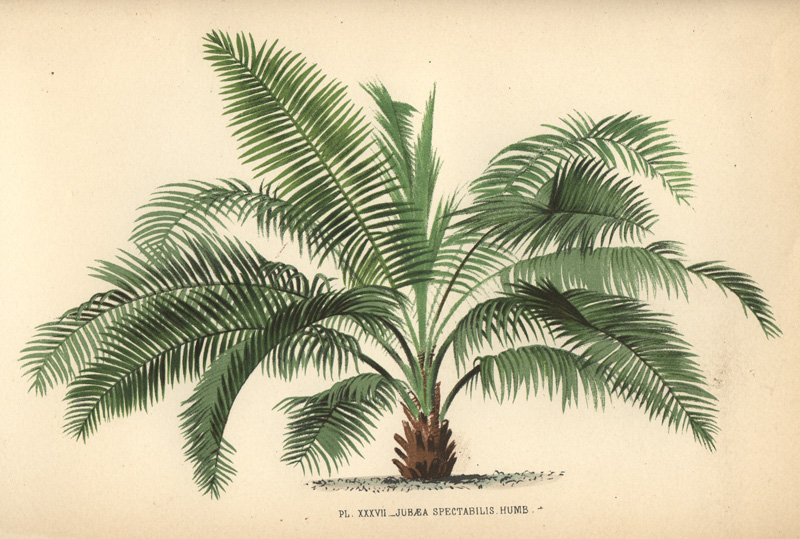
- Jubaea chilensis

Scientific classification
- Kingdom: Plantae
- Clade: Tracheophytes
- Clade: Angiosperms
- Clade: Monocots
- Clade: Commelinids
- Order: Arecales
- Family: Arecaceae
- Subfamily: Arecoideae
- Tribe: Cocoseae; Mart. ex Dumort.

Genera
- See text

= Cocoseae =

Tribe of palms

Cocoseae is a tribe of cocosoid palms of the family Arecaceae.

== Description ==
The fruit of the Cocoseae is a modified drupe, with a sclerenchymatous epicarp and a highly developed mesocarp, formed mainly by parenchyma . The endocarp is generally sclerenchymatous and protects the seeds from predation and drying. The most obvious synapomorphy of the species of this tribe is the presence, in the endocarp, of three or more "eyes" or pores of germination. According to Thomas C. Whitmore all Cocosoid palms have inflorescences in which the flowers are in triads (sets of three flowers).

== Distribution ==
The Cocoseae are distributed mainly in the Neotropical regions, with two genera endemic to Africa (Jubaeopsis and Elaeis) and Madagascar (Beccariophoenix and Voanioala), respectively.

=== Phylogeny ===
A 2016 molecular phylogenomic analysis of the tribe Cocoseae gives the following phylogenetic tree:

- Cocoseae
  - Bactris spiny palms of C. and S. America
  - - Elaeis oleifera (American oil palm) of C. and S. America
    - - - Beccariophoenix madagascariensis (coastal beccariophoenix) of Madagascar
        - - Voanioala gerardii (forest coconut) of Madagascar
          - Jubaeopsis (Pondoland palm) of S. Africa
      - - - Jubaea chilensis (Chilean wine palm) of central Chile
          - Butia (feather palms) of S. America
        - - - Attalea non-spiny palms of C. and S. America
            - - Parajubaea palms of the Northern Andes
              - Allagoptera monoecious palms of S. America
          - - Cocos nucifera (coconut palm) of the Indo-Pacific, made cosmopolitan by humans
            - Syagrus palms of S. America

== Systematics ==
The Cocoseae in the sense of Dransfield et al. (2008) are identified as natural relatives (monophylum) in most studies. Their systematic position within the Arecoideae is still unclear. Different studies see them as a sister group of the Reinhardtieae, as a sister group of the group from Reinhardtieae and Roystoneeae, or as a sister group of the Oranieae.

The tribe is divided into three subtribes. All three are monophyletic. Bactridinae and Elaeidinae are sister groups

=== Genera ===
Subtribe	Image	Genus	Extant species
Beccariophoenicinae J.Dransf. & Uhl		Beccariophoenix Jum. & H.Perrier	Beccariophoenix alfredii Rakotoarin., Ranariv. & J.Dransf. (High plateau coconut palm); Beccariophoenix madagascariensis Jum. & H.Perrier (Coastal beccariophoenix); Beccariophoenix fenestralis J. Dransfield & M. Rakotoarinivo (Giant windowpane palm)
Butiinae Saakov		Allagoptera Nees	Allagoptera arenaria (Gomes) Kuntze (1891); Allagoptera brevicalyx M.Moraes (1993); Allagoptera campestris (Mart.) Kuntze (1891); Allagoptera caudescens (Mart.) Kuntze (1891)(Buri palm); Allagoptera leucocalyx (Drude) Kuntze (1891)
Butiinae Saakov		Butia (Becc.) Becc (Jelly palms)	Butia archeri (Glassman) Glassman; Butia arenicola (Barb.Rodr.) Burret; Butia campicola (Barb.Rodr.) Noblick; Butia capitata (Mart.) Becc.; Butia catarinensis Noblick & Lorenzi; Butia eriospatha (Mart. ex Drude) Becc. (Woolly butia palm); Butia exilata Deble & Marchiori; Butia exospadix Noblick; Butia lallemantii Deble & Marchiori; Butia lepidotispatha Noblick; Butia leptospatha (Burret) Noblick; Butia marmorii Noblick; Butia matogrossensis Noblick & Lorenzi; Butia microspadix Burret; Butia odorata (Barb.Rodr.) Noblick (South American jelly palm); Butia paraguayensis (Barb.Rodr.) L.H.Bailey (Dwarf yatay palm); Butia pubispatha Noblick & Lorenzi; Butia purpurascens Glassman; Butia witeckii K.Soares & S. Longhi; Butia yatay (Mart.) Becc.
Butiinae Saakov		Jubaea Kunth	Jubaea chilensis (Molina) Baill. (Chilean wine palm)
Butiinae Saakov		Jubaeopsis Becc.	Jubaeopsis afra Becc. (Pondoland palm)
Butiinae Saakov		Cocos L.	Cocos nucifera L. (Coconut)
Butiinae Saakov		Syagrus Mart.	56 species: Syagrus allagopteroides Noblick & Lorenzi; Syagrus amara (Jacq.) Mart. (Overtop palm); Syagrus angustifolia Noblick & Lorenzi; Syagrus botryophora (Mart.) Mart.; Syagrus caerulescens Noblick & Lorenzi; Syagrus campestris (Mart.) Bomhard; Syagrus campylospatha (Barb.Rodr.) Becc.; Syagrus cardenasii Glassman; Syagrus cearensis Noblick; Syagrus cerqueirana Noblick & Lorenzi; Syagrus cocoides Mart.; Syagrus comosa (Mart.) Mart.; Syagrus coronata (Mart.) Becc. (Licuri palm); Syagrus deflexa Noblick & Lorenzi; Syagrus duartei Glassman; Syagrus evansiana Noblick; Syagrus flexuosa (Mart.) Becc.; Syagrus glaucescens Glaz. ex Becc.; Syagrus glazioviana (Dammer) Becc.; Syagrus gouveiana Noblick & Lorenzi; Syagrus graminifolia (Drude) Becc.; Syagrus harleyi Glassman; Syagrus hoehnei Burret; Syagrus inajai (Spruce) Becc.; Syagrus insignis S(Devansaye) Becc.; Syagrus itacambirana Noblick & Lorenzi; Syagrus itapebiensis (Noblick & Lorenzi) Noblick & Meerow; Syagrus kellyana Noblick & Lorenzi; Syagrus lilliputiana (Barb.Rodr.) Becc.; Syagrus loefgrenii Glassman; Syagrus lorenzoniorum Noblick & Lorenzi; Syagrus macrocarpa Barb.Rodr.; Syagrus mendanhensis Glassman; Syagrus microphylla Burret; Syagrus minor Noblick & Lorenzi; Syagrus oleracea (Mart.) Becc.; Syagrus orinocensis (Spruce) Burret; Syagrus petraea (Mart.) Becc.; Syagrus picrophylla Barb.Rodr.; Syagrus pimentae Noblick; Syagrus pleioclada Burret; Syagrus pleiocladoides Noblick & Lorenzi; Syagrus pompeoi K. Soares & R. Pimenta; Syagrus procumbens Noblick & Lorenzi; Syagrus pseudococos (Raddi) Glassman; Syagrus romanzoffiana (Cham.) Glassman (Queen palm); Syagrus rupicola Noblick & Lorenzi; Syagrus ruschiana (Bondar) Glassman; Syagrus sancona (Kunth) H. Karst.; Syagrus santosii K. Soares & C.A. Guim.; Syagrus schizophylla (Mart.) Glassman (Arikury palm); Syagrus smithii (H.E.Moore) Glassman; Syagrus stenopetala Burret; Syagrus stratincola Wess.Boer; Syagrus vagans (Bondar) A.D. Hawkes; Syagrus vermicularis Noblick; Syagrus weddelliana (H. Wendl.) Becc.; Syagrus werdermannii Burret; Syagrus yungasensis M. Moraes
Butiinae Saakov		Parajubaea Burret	Parajubaea cocoides Burret; Parajubaea sunkha M.Moraes; Parajubaea torallyi (Mart.) Burret
Butiinae Saakov		Voanioala J. Dransf.	Voanioala gerardii J. Dransf. (Forest coconut)
Attaleinae Drude		Attalea Kunth	List of Attalea species
Elaeidinae Hook.f.		Barcella (Trail) Trail ex Drude	Barcella odora(Trail) Drude
Elaeidinae Hook.f.		Elaeis Jacq.	Elaeis guineensis Jacq. (African oil palm); Elaeis oleifera (Kunth) Cortés (American oil palm)
Bactridinae Drude		Acrocomia Mart.	Acrocomia aculeata (Jacq.) Lodd. ex R.Keith; Acrocomia crispa (Kunth) C. Baker ex. Becc.; Acrocomia emensis (Toledo) Lorenzi; Acrocomia glaucescens Lorenzi; Acrocomia hassleri (Barb.Rodr.) W.J.Hahn; Acrocomia intumescens Drude; Acrocomia media O.F.Cook; Acrocomia totai Mart.
Bactridinae Drude		Aiphanes Willd.	29 species: Aiphanes acanthophylla (Mart.) Burret; Aiphanes acaulis Galeano & R.Bernal; Aiphanes bicornis Cerón & R.Bernal; Aiphanes buenaventurae R.Bernal & Borchs.; Aiphanes chiribogensis Borchs. & Balslev; Aiphanes deltoidea Burret; Aiphanes duquei Burret; Aiphanes eggersii Burret; Aiphanes erinacea (H.Karst.) H.Wendl.; Aiphanes gelatinosa H.E.Moore; Aiphanes graminifolia Galeano & R.Bernal; Aiphanes grandis Borchs. & Balslev; Aiphanes hirsuta Burret; Aiphanes horrida (Jacq.) Burret; Aiphanes leiostachys Burret; Aiphanes lindeniana (H.Wendl.) H.Wendl.; Aiphanes linearis Burret; Aiphanes macroloba Burret; Aiphanes minima (Gaertn.) Burret; Aiphanes multiplex R.Bernal & Borchs.; Aiphanes parvifolia Burret; Aiphanes pilaris R.Bernal; Aiphanes simplex Burret; Aiphanes spicata Borchs. & R.Bernal; Aiphanes stergiosii S.M.Niño; Aiphanes tricuspidata Borchs., M.Ruíz & Bernal; Aiphanes ulei (Dammer) Burret; Aiphanes verrucosa Borchs. & Balslev; Aiphanes weberbaueri Burret
Bactridinae Drude		Astrocaryum G.Mey.	36 species: Astrocaryum acaule Mart.; Astrocaryum aculeatissimum (Schott) Burret; Astrocaryum aculeatum G.Mey.; Astrocaryum alatum Loomis; Astrocaryum campestre Mart.; Astrocaryum carnosum F.Kahn & B.Millán; Astrocaryum chambira Burret; Astrocaryum chonta Mart.; Astrocaryum ciliatum F.Kahn & B.Millán; Astrocaryum confertum H.Wendl. ex Burret; Astrocaryum faranae F.Kahn & E.Ferreira; Astrocaryum farinosum Barb.Rodr.; Astrocaryum ferrugineum F.Kahn & B.Millán; Astrocaryum giganteum Barb.Rodr.; Astrocaryum gratum F.Kahn & B.Millán; Astrocaryum gynacanthum Mart.; Astrocaryum huaimi Mart.; Astrocaryum huicungo Dammer ex Burret; Astrocaryum jauari Mart.; Astrocaryum javarense (Trail) Drude; Astrocaryum macrocalyx Burret; Astrocaryum malybo H.Karst.; Astrocaryum mexicanum Liebm. ex Mart.; Astrocaryum minus Trail; Astrocaryum murumuru Mart.; Astrocaryum paramaca Mart.; Astrocaryum perangustatum F.Kahn & B.Millán; Astrocaryum rodriguesii Trail; Astrocaryum sciophilum (Miq.) Pulle; Astrocaryum scopatum F.Kahn & B.Millán; Astrocaryum sociale Barb.Rodr.; Astrocaryum standleyanum L.H.Bailey; Astrocaryum triandrum Galeano-Garces, R.Bernal & F.Kahn; Astrocaryum ulei Burret; Astrocaryum urostachys Burret; Astrocaryum vulgare Mart.
Bactridinae Drude		Bactris Jacq. ex Scop.	78 species: Bactris acanthocarpa Mart.; Bactris acanthocarpoides Barb.Rodr.; Bactris ana-juliae Cascante; Bactris aubletiana Trail; Bactris bahiensis Noblick ex A.J.Hend.; Bactris balanophora Spruce; Bactris barronis L.H.Bailey; Bactris bidentula Spruce; Bactris bifida Mart.; Bactris brongniartii Mart.; Bactris campestris Poepp.; Bactris caryotifolia Mart.; Bactris caudata H.Wendl. ex Burret; Bactris charnleyae de Nevers, A.J.Hend. & Grayum; Bactris chaveziae A.J.Hend.; Bactris coloniata L.H.Bailey; Bactris coloradonis L.H.Bailey; Bactris concinna Mart.; Bactris constanciae Barb.Rodr.; Bactris corossilla H.Karst.; Bactris cubensis Burret; Bactris cuspidata Mart.; Bactris dianeura Burret; Bactris elegans Barb.Rodr. & Trail; Bactris faucium Mart.; Bactris ferruginea Burret; Bactris fissifrons Mart.; Bactris gasipaes Kunth; Bactris gastoniana Barb.Rodr.; Bactris glandulosa Oerst.; Bactris glassmanii Med.-Costa & Noblick ex A.J.Hend.; Bactris glaucescens Drude; Bactris gracilior Burret; Bactris grayumii de Nevers & A.J.Hend.; Bactris guineensis (L.) H.E.Moore; Bactris halmoorei A.J.Hend.; Bactris hatschbachii Noblick ex A.J.Hend.; Bactris herrerana Cascante; Bactris hirta Mart.; Bactris hondurensis Standl.; Bactris horridispatha Noblick ex A.J.Hend.; Bactris jamaicana L.H.Bailey; Bactris killipii Burret; Bactris kunorum de Nevers & Grayum; Bactris longiseta H.Wendl. ex Burret; Bactris macroacantha Mart.; Bactris major Jacq.; Bactris maraja Mart.; Bactris martiana A.J.Hend.; Bactris mexicana Mart.; Bactris militaris H.E.Moore; Bactris nancibaensis Granv.; Bactris oligocarpa Barb.Rodr.; Bactris oligoclada Burret; Bactris panamensis de Nevers & Grayum; Bactris pickelii Burret; Bactris pilosa H.Karst.; Bactris pliniana Granv. & A.J.Hend.; Bactris plumeriana Mart.; Bactris polystachya Grayum; Bactris ptariana Steyerm.; Bactris rhaphidacantha Wess.Boer; Bactris riparia Mart.; Bactris rostrata Galeano & R.Bernal; Bactris schultesii (L.H.Bailey) Glassman; Bactris setiflora Burret; Bactris setosa Mart.; Bactris setulosa H.Karst.; Bactris simplicifrons Mart.; Bactris soeiroana Noblick ex A.J.Hend.; Bactris sphaerocarpa Trail; Bactris syagroides Barb.Rodr. & Trail; Bactris tefensis A.J.Hend.; Bactris timbuiensis H.Q.B.Fern.; Bactris tomentosa Mart.; Bactris turbinocarpa Barb.Rodr.; Bactris vulgaris Barb.Rodr.
Bactridinae Drude		Desmoncus (Trail) Trail ex Drude	24 species: Desmoncus chinantlensis Liebm. ex Mart.; Desmoncus cirrhifer A.H.Gentry & Zardini; Desmoncus costaricensis (Kuntze) Burret; Desmoncus giganteus A.J.Hend.; Desmoncus horridus Splitg. ex Mart.; Desmoncus interjectus A.J.Hend.; Desmoncus kunarius de Nevers ex A.J.Hend.; Desmoncus latisectus Burret; Desmoncus leptoclonos Drude; Desmoncus loretanus A.J.Hend.; Desmoncus madrensis A.J.Hend.; Desmoncus mitis Mart.; Desmoncus moorei A.J.Hend.; Desmoncus myriacanthos Dugand.; Desmoncus obovoideus A.J.Hend.; Desmoncus orthacanthos Mart.; Desmoncus osensis A.J.Hend.; Desmoncus parvulus L.H.Bailey; Desmoncus polyacanthos Mart.; Desmoncus prunifer Poepp. ex Mart.; Desmoncus pumilus Trail.; Desmoncus setosus Mart.; Desmoncus stans Grayum & Nevers; Desmoncus vacivus L.H.Bailey
