= List of plants of the Amazon rainforest of Brazil =

This is a list of plants found in the wild in Amazon rainforest vegetation of Brazil. The estimates from useful plants suggested that there are 800 plant species of economic or social value in this forest, according to Giacometti (1990).

== Apocynaceae ==
- Aspidosperma
  - Aspidosperma oblongum A.DC.
- Hancornia
  - Hancornia speciosa Gomes

== Arecaceae ==
- Attalea
  - Attalea speciosa
- Aphandra
  - Aphandra natalia (Balslev & A.J.Hend.) Barfod
- Astrocaryum
  - Astrocaryum chambira Burret
  - Astrocaryum faranae F.Kahn. & E.Ferreira
  - Astrocaryum ferrugineum F.Kahn. & B.Millán
  - Astrocaryum jauari Mart.
  - Astrocaryum murumuru Mart.
  - Astrocaryum vulgare Mart.
- Attalea
  - Attalea maripa (Aubl.) Mart.
- Bactris
  - Bactris gasipaes Kunth
- Chamaedorea
  - Chamaedorea pinnatifrons
- Chelyocarpus
  - Chelyocarpus ulei
- Desmoncus
  - Desmoncus giganteus
  - Desmoncus mitis
- Dictyocaryum
  - Dictyocaryum ptarianum
- Euterpe
  - Euterpe oleracea Mart.
  - Euterpe precatoria
  - Euterpe longevaginata
- Hyospathe
  - Hyospathe elegans
- Iriartea
  - Iriartea deltoidea
- Iriartella
  - Iriartella stenocarpa
- Leopoldinia
  - Leopoldinia piassaba Wallace
- Lepidocaryum
  - Lepidocaryum tenue
- Oenocarpus
  - Oenocarpus bacaba Mart.
  - Oenocarpus balickii
  - Oenocarpus bataua
- Socratea
  - Socratea exorrhiza Mart.
  - Socratea salazari
- Syagrus
  - Syagrus smithii
- Wettinia
  - Wettinia augusta

== Bromeliaceae ==
- Aechmea
  - Aechmea chantinii (Carrière) Baker
  - Aechmea rodriguesiana (= Aechmea meeana E.Pereira & Reitz)

== Chrysobalanaceae ==
- Acioa
  - Acioa edulis Prance
- Couepia
  - Couepia longipendula
- Microdesmia
  - Microdesmia rigida

== Clusiaceae ==
- Platonia
  - Platonia insignis Mart. (= Aristoclesia esculenta Stuntz) - Bakury

== Euphorbiaceae ==
- Alchornea
  - Alchornea castaneifolia (Bonpl. ex Willd.) A.Juss. - Iporuru
  - Alchornea triplinervia (Spreng.) Müll.Arg.
- Croton
  - Croton lanjouwensis
- Hevea
  - Hevea brasiliensis Müll.Arg. - Pará rubber tree or Seringueira
- Hura
  - Hura crepitans L. (= Hura brasiliensis Wild.)
- Manihot
  - Manihot esculenta - Manioc
- Micrandropsis
  - Micrandropsis scleroxylon

== Fabaceae ==
=== Caesalpinioideae ===
- Vouacapoua
  - Vouacapoua americana Aubl.

== Heliconiaceae ==
- Heliconia
  - Heliconia burle-marxii Emygdio

== Lecythidaceae ==
- Allantoma
  - Allantoma lineata Miers
- Couroupita
  - Couroupita guianensis Aubl.

== Malpighiaceae ==
- Tetrapterys
  - Tetrapterys methystica R.E.Schult.

== Malvaceae ==
- Apeiba
  - Apeiba albiflora Ducke
- Quararibea
  - Quararibea cordata Vischer

== Meliaceae ==
- Carapa
  - Carapa guianensis Aubl.

== Myrtaceae ==
- Eugenia
  - Eugenia stipitata McVaugh - Araza

== Olacaceae ==
- Minquartia
  - Minquartia guianensis Aublet

== Orchidaceae ==
- Cattleya
  - Cattleya violacea

== Rubiaceae ==
- Cinchona
  - Cinchona officinalis L.

== Podocarpaceae ==
- Podocarpus
  - Podocarpus brasiliensis

== See also ==
- List of plants of Atlantic Forest vegetation of Brazil
- List of plants of Caatinga vegetation of Brazil
- List of plants of Cerrado vegetation of Brazil
- List of plants of Pantanal vegetation of Brazil
- Official list of endangered flora of Brazil
