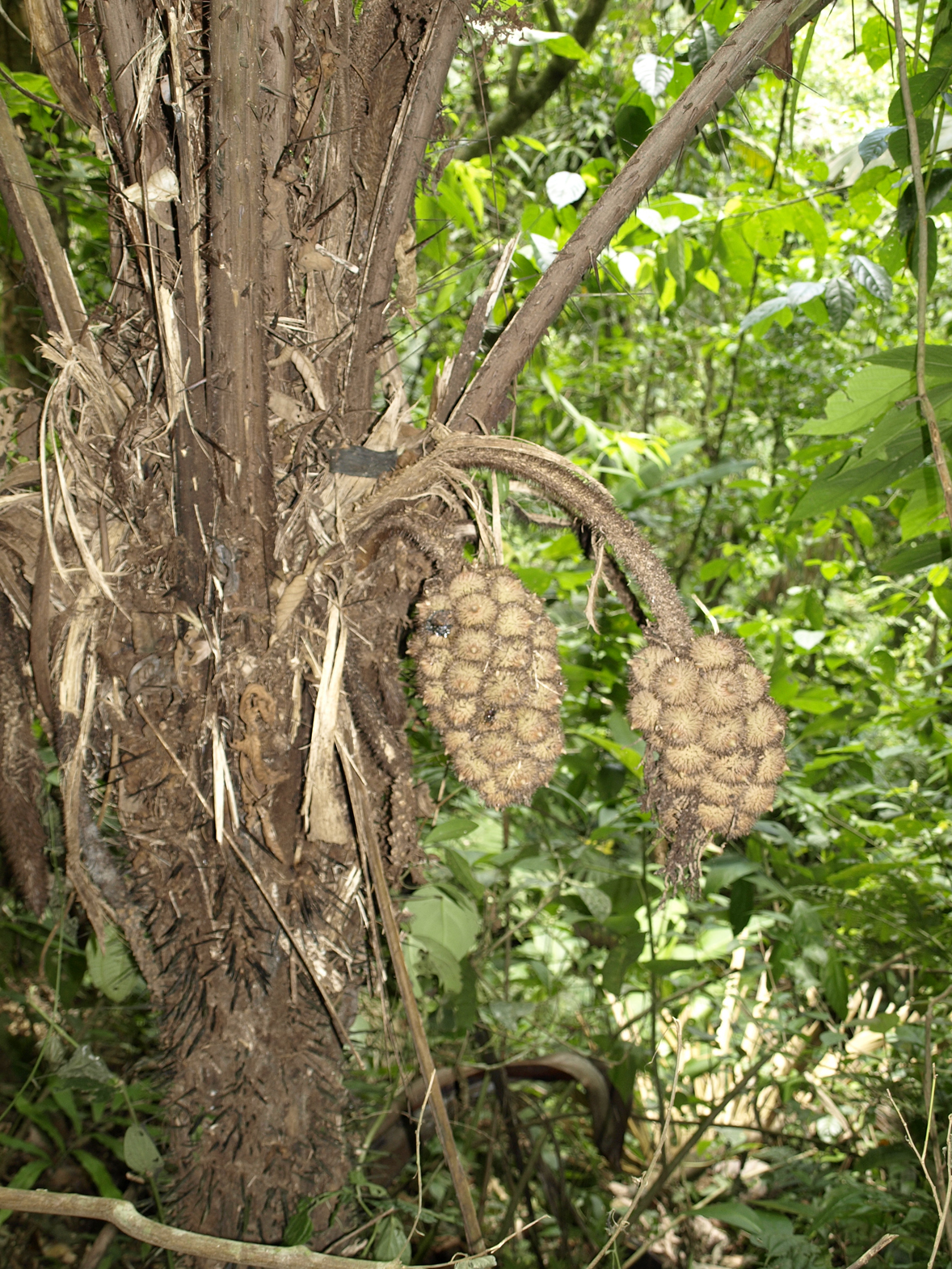

Conservation status
- Near Threatened (IUCN 3.1)

Scientific classification
- Kingdom: Plantae
- Clade: Tracheophytes
- Clade: Angiosperms
- Clade: Monocots
- Clade: Commelinids
- Order: Arecales
- Family: Arecaceae
- Genus: Astrocaryum
- Species: A. alatum

Binomial name
- Astrocaryum alatum H.F.Loomis

Synonyms
- Hexopetion alatum (H.F.Loomis) F.Kahn & Pintaud

= Astrocaryum alatum =

Species of palm

Astrocaryum alatum is a species of palm with edible nuts, a flowering plant in the family Arecaceae. It is a common species found many types of rainforests and swamps in Honduras, Costa Rica, Nicaragua and Panama.

It is locally known as the coquillo or coquito in Costa Rica.

== Description ==
Astrocaryum alatum is the most common, least spiny and smallest of the three species of Astrocaryum in Costa Rica.

It is a solitary palm, it does not form a cluster of trunks. The trunk grows up to six metres in height, often just two to four metres. It is fast-growing, faster than other Astrocaryum species.

The ripe fruit are some 3.8–5 cm long and 3.2-3.8 cm in width. Typically, this species has fruit which are densely spiny on the end half, but smooth in the basal half where it connects to the rachis. The fruit are more-or-less obovoid, greenish brown to yellow-brown and have a small beak at their end. They are borne in compact, spicate clusters. The rachillae develop entirely from staminate tissue, and break easily or naturally when the fruit are fully ripe. The flesh is white, firm, and a few millimetres thick.

=== Similar species ===
In Costa Rica there are three species of Astrocaryum, and the other two species, A. confertum and A. standleyanum, are uncommon and restricted in range, although both are sympatric with A. alatum. This is the smallest, most common and least spiny species. It is the only species to have large fruit with spines on their distal ends, which are not a bright orange colour. It is also the only species to have leaves with unevenly divided leaflets which are arranged on a single plane, as opposed to multiple planes in the other two species, which gives their leaves a plumose appearance. The inflorescence of A. confertum is held erect, even when it is eventually covered in ripe fruit.

A. mexicanum is the most similar species, so similar that in 1995 some experts noted the two taxa might be conspecific. Jean-Christophe Pintaud and colleagues provided a table of differences in anatomical leaf characteristics in 2008, which are rather subtle and require a microscope. The key provided notes the following differences: A. mexicanum has a thinner trunk without persistent leaf bases, but armed with rings or groups of flattened spines; smaller flowers with a proportionally smaller calyx and distinct, tooth-like staminodes (as opposed to staminodes merged into a ring); fruit with more but shorter spines; and the nut with the three pores positioned close to the apex (as opposed to up to a third of the distance from it).

Acrocomia species are other palms which are similar enough to be confused with this species, and the clustering Manicaria saccifera is superficially similar. Cryosophila species are also large palms and also have big trunk spines, but have fan-shaped leaves and forked spines. Several Bactris species have sharp trunk spines, but are often smaller trees. Astrocaryum species in general can be told apart from these and other palm genera by the whitish or silvery undersides of the leaves.

== Common names ==
The Spanish name coyolillo is a diminutive of coyól. The name is attested from Costa Rica in 1908, and said to also be used for different species of palm. The word coyól itself is derived from the Nahuatl language word coyolli, and originally means a type of round bell.

== Taxonomy ==
Astrocaryum alatum was first described in 1939 by Harold F. Loomis, an agronomist working at the U.S. Plant Introduction Garden, Coconut Grove, Florida (and also an important millipede expert). The 1939 article itself remarks that it is strange such a large, common and obvious plant in a well-known region had only attracted the attention of a taxonomist so late in history. This is because it was, in fact, known before. The pioneer ethnobiologist Henri François Pittier discussed the species using the name A. polystachyum. This name had apparently first appeared in a 1885 publication by William Hemsley in the series Biologia Centrali-Americana, but attributed to the German palm expert Hermann Wendland, and said to grow in Costa Rica, citing a type kept in Kew which was collected along the Sarapiquí River. There appears to be some confusion here: Wendland had never described a A. polystachyum, but instead had named a A. confertum from Costa Rica (absent in Hemsley's work). A. polystachyum is now considered a synonym of A. confertum, but Pittier is clearly referring to A. alatum in his work, based on his description and the range he gives.

As such an author of 1939 article had stayed at the town of El Cairo, Costa Rica, in 1937 and 1938, collecting specimens and seeds of the palm and calling it A. polystachyum. The seeds had been exported to the USDA in the US, and from there been distributed to interested plant growers in Florida with the Plant Introduction number 123380 under the name A. polystachyum. It was noticed however, that neither Hemsley nor Wendland had properly described the species, thus Loomis decided to rename the taxon A. alatum. (Note: Pittier provides an accurate description in his 1908 work. This is written in Spanish, but ICN article 39, which (formerly) required that new taxon names be accompanied by a Latin description or diagnosis only went into effect in 1935. Nonetheless, A. polystachyum has been considered an implicit synonym of A. confertum, because it is based on a illegitimate ex author. See ICN article 46. Pittier omits designating a type, so his publication may not be valid anyway.)

=== Typification ===
Loomis did not designate a single holotype, it is difficult to fit all the representative organs of a large palm on a single herbarium sheet, but a type series of sheets of palm parts, stored at the United States National Herbarium, collected "along the Río Hondo near the fields of Santa Clara" by Orator F. Cook and C. B. Doyle in 1903. (Note: This location is properly called "Llanuras de Santa Clara". These are some flat agricultural fields at 100m elevation in the south of Roxana, Pococí (zoom in on the map); Cook and Doyle's "Río Hondo" (deep river) is probably the Río Santa Clara, which runs through these farmlands.)

=== Classification ===
A. mexicanum is very similar. Palm expert Andrew James Henderson and colleagues noted in their 1995 Field Guide to the Palms of the Americas that it was so similar, it might even be conspecific. Max Burret had classified A. mexicanum in a segregate genus Hexopetion in 1934, and when Loomis described A. alatum in 1939 he neglected comparing the two taxa, but none of the important publications on Neotropical palm taxonomy which were published in the rest of the 20th century followed Burret. Jean-Christophe Pintaud and colleagues placed A. alatum in Hexopetion in their 2008 paper, re-describing Hexopetion in the process to allow for the inclusion, although few seem to have followed their taxonomic interpretation.

In 2011 a group containing some of the previous authors published a study which looked at the differences between related palms in a number of plastid DNA and nuclear markers in order to elucidate their phylogeny. This study found strong evidence that A. alatum and A. mexicanum form a monophyletic group sister to the remaining Astrocaryum species.

== Distribution ==
Astrocaryum alatum is a widespread and common species found in eastern Honduras (Gracias a Dios Department), Costa Rica, eastern Nicaragua and western Panama. It occurs on both coasts of Costa Rica, although the IUCN claims it mostly occurs on the Caribbean side (although the distribution map as well as the list of national parks provided by the same website contradicts this).

In Panama it occurs in the provinces of Bocas del Toro, Coclé, Colón, San Blas and Veraguas, as well as the formerly US controlled Panama Canal Zone. (Note: Panama has restructured its administrative divisions since the 1995 reference, the following provinces/indigenous regions have been carved from the listed provinces and the Canal Zone: Panamá Oeste, Ngäbe-Buglé and Naso Tjër Di) Henderson et al. state that the Panama Canal appears to mark its eastern limit, but San Blas lies to the east of the Canal. It is common near the Canal around the town of Santa Rita and in Bocas del Toro.

In Nicaragua it occurs in the departments of Río San Juan and Zelaya.

As of 2022 the Plants of the World Online website claims it occurs in Colombia, but this is referenced to a source (Catálogo de plantas y líquenes de Colombia) which does not mention this species at all. Other older sources also state it occurs in Colombia.

== Ecology ==
=== Habitat ===
Astrocaryum alatum occurs from sea level to an altitude of 1,000 metres, or 15 to 400 metres in Nicaragua, or 0 to at least 800 metres in Costa Rica. It is not a habitat specialist in general. Although it occurs in numerous habitats, it is particularly abundant in swamp forests. It can germinate and survive in soft, watery mud, as well as firm soil, but avoids constantly submerged ground. It is also common in disturbed, cleared forest land, mature secondary woodland and deforested pastures. This species also occurs in higher altitude upland rainforest, but in this habitat it occurs as an understory palm at relatively low densities, whereas it is often found in very high abundance in swamps. It does have some specific microclimate preferences in swamp forests, its distribution is primarily aggregated in two specific phytosociological associations, a specific type of inundated palm swamp and a mixed hardwood swamp dominated by Pterocarpus officinalis (this is locally called sangrillo). The habitats often intergrade to some extent. Although it is a very common species in both habitats, it not a dominant species in either.

There are a number of different types of palm swamp forests in Central America. A. alatum enjoys a particular low-biodiversity, high-density Manicaria saccifera-dominated swamp which is inundated up to a meter deep at times, although the ground is drained a number of times a year. The ground is covered in water most of the year, but usually the water table is very close to soil level. M. saccifera is a superficially very similar palm. The water is often brackish. This swamp-type is very densely planted with hundreds of trees a hectare, many of them hardwoods. Most of this habitat is found in the lowlands along the Caribbean coast, and it is very common within Barra del Colorado Wildlife Refuge and Tortuguero National Park in Costa Rica, extending deep into central eastern Nicaragua, but also is recorded to occur in Caño Negro Wildlife Refuge, and along the Pacific coast in the Osa Peninsula in the Sierpe region (Térraba-Sierpe National Wetlands). M. saccifera shares this habitat with the palms A. alatum and Euterpe spp., with the most common broad-leaf trees being Calophyllum brasiliense, Symphonia globulifera, Carapa guianensis and Dialium guianense. Astrocaryum mexicanum takes the place of A. alatum in otherwise extremely similar Manicaria swamp in Belize to the north of the range of A. alatum. Manatees often move into the deeper channels found in these swamps in order to feed on aquatic plants (Ludwigia and Hydrilla). There are no species endemic to such habitats, overall herpetofauna biodiversity is low and similar to surrounding lands, but larger mammals may frequently briefly forage in these areas when the ground dries.

Sangrillo swamp forests are one of the most common habitats in Costa Rica. The land is flat, near sea level and often floods. Soils are alluvial, black in colour and rich in organic material. Fresh water covers the land for up to nine months a year, it drains continuously but the ground is always wet. Trees usually have buttress roots. In this forest type, A. alatum is the third most common species by basal area, after Pterocarpus officinalis and then Carapa guianensis, but these statistics are exactly opposite when one looks at mature individuals per hectare, with A. alatum being present at an average density of 143 stems/ha. Less commonly found trees here are Pentaclethra macroloba and Virola multiflora. In these forests A. alatum is part of the canopy. The palms share the land with giant herbaceous plants such as Heliconia spp. and Maranta spp. There is ample ground-cover. It grows together with Virola sebifera in the lowland forest of Barbilla National Park in Costa Rica.

A 2002 World Bank report classified and mapped Central America into some 90 ecosystems/ecoregions. In this system A. alatum is a frequent species, but never a dominant, in four main types of lowland forests, including the two ecosystems discussed above. The other mentioned ecosystems are well-drained, and moderately drained, tropical evergreen broad-leaved lowland rainforest.

A well-drained, tall-growing, ground-cover-poor rainforest characterised along the Térraba River at 800m elevation near Pacific coast of Costa Rica, on a substrate of latosols, soil from marine sediments and some inceptisols, found A. alatum to be a frequently occurring species, along with Ardisia spp., Aspidosperma myristicifolia, Caryocar costaricense, Coccoloba padiformis, C. standleyana, C. tuerckheimii, Cordia gerascanthus, Cryosophila guarara, Eleagia auriculata, Genipa americana, Gustavia angustifolia, (Note: G. angustifolia does not occur in Costa Rica, G. brachycarpa is the only Gustavia species in the country.) Jacaratia costaricensis and Socratea spp.. The submontane rainforest above 800m at this site had a similar composition.

The palm is not especially common in most types of moderately drained rainforest on the Pacific side of Costa Rica, but it is a frequently seen species on the Atlantic side. In Nicaragua, this type of rainforest commonly occurs in valleys and lower elevations in hilly terrain, and vegetation largely mixes with that of more well-drained soils on the hills. This type of woodland has a complex species composition, a few dozen tree species are recorded as frequent here and there are also many bushes and epiphytes. In Nicaragua it is one of the seven most common palms in this habitat.

=== Animal associations ===
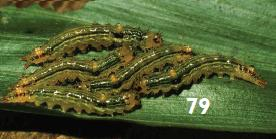
Dunama jessiehillae larvae penultimate instar feeding on a palm frond

In Nicaragua, it flowers throughout the year, but it fruits in October to May, although fruit and seeds appear to fall to ground and be available year-round in Costa Rica. The scarab beetle Cyclocephala amazona was found to visit the flowers in Panama, among a number of other palms and other plants. In Costa Rica C. stictica and Mimeoma acuta visit the flower of this palm and certain other plants, in the case of M. acuta only other palms. The palm hosts two planthopper species from the new genus Agoo in Costa Rica, A. dahliana and A. luzdenia. As nymphs, these insects (probably) only feed on the fungi growing on the dead fronds which hang from the base of the crown of this palm. The caterpillars of the small cryptic moth Dunama jessiehillae has been recorded feeding on the leaves of this palm. They feed exclusively on palms, but of 506 food plant records, only five are from A. alatum (almost two thirds are from Chamaedorea tepejilote, the rest from another twelve species). D. jessiehillae is restricted in distribution to mid-elevation rainforests on the Pacific coast of Costa Rica.

A. alatum has very large seeds, and it may occur at higher elevations. Like a number of other Astrocaryum investigated, it appears to be almost completely dependent on a single species, an agouti (Dasyprocta punctata), for most of the seed dispersal. This is a large rodent weighing 2–4 kg. The agouti collects the fruits, cleans them of their pulp to stop that from attracting other animals, and caches the seeds, burying them in the soil usually near an object such as a rock, a fallen tree branch, or a buttress root. It is constantly interested in its caches and often digs up the seeds to rebury them elsewhere. One agouti will commonly rob the cache of another, transporting the seeds to new locations, and seeds can be transported sizeable distances in this manner. The behaviour is known as scatter-hoarding. Astrocaryum are advantageous to agoutis, because the seeds do not germinate quickly, allowing them to keep the seeds for lean times. They appear to preferentially store seeds with a long shelf-life, consuming those that germinate quickly first. The agoutis have other advantages for palms besides dispersal. Hiding the seeds in caches makes it harder for seed predators to find the seeds, both mammals and insects, and helps prevent the death of seeds and seedlings.

Collared peccaries (Pecari tajacu) are particularly destructive. These animals travel in large groups through the forest, trampling young plants, consuming fruit and seeds found on the ground, raiding agouti caches, and uprooting seedlings in order to feed on the attached seed. The seeds do not pass through the digestive systems of peccaries intact (agoutis also crush the seeds before ingesting them). Cached seeds are harder for the peccaries to find, and they may pass through an area a number of times without discovering a cache. Other animals which eat the seeds are squirrels and small rodents, specifically the spiny rat Proechimys semispinosus and the spiny pocket mouse Heteromys desmarestianus. Proechimys semispinosus is known to scatter-hoard Astrocaryum as well, and are very common animals, but field observations and camera traps found that the mammals interacting with the palm seeds on the forest floor were overwhelmingly peccaries and agoutis.

Seeds may also suffer infestation from insects, primarily beetle species. Scolytine beetles bore small holes into the seed coat (endocarp) to get inside, while bruchid beetles bore large holes. Seed-boring bark beetles Coccotrypes were found to infest a high percentage of the seeds in Costa Rica. These are small (approximately 1mm) beetles which bore holes through the endocarp, and into the endosperm of the palm seeds. Non-hoarded seeds suffer significantly higher levels of infestation by Coccotrypes.

== Uses ==
The endosperm of the large seeds tastes pleasantly like coconut, and the fruits are sometimes harvested for this in Costa Rica. According to a Kew website it has local traditional medicinal uses in Colombia, but it does not occur in Colombia.

== Conservation ==
Although it is very common, for two decades the IUCN apparently mistakenly claimed it was rare. The palm is actually very abundant and widespread, but another taxon, Astrocaryum confertum-a very similar species to A. standleyanum, was formerly only known from a single 19th century collection in Costa Rica, the holotype copy of which had been lost with the Allied fire bombing of the Berlin museum and botanical garden and the only surviving isotype housed at Kew. Although A. confertum had never actually been properly described until 1934, nonetheless it was the only species of Astrocaryum said to occur in Costa Rica for much of the early 19th century, until it became apparent that the palms in the country described under that name were instead the species A. alatum, and A. confertum became an enigmatic relic of history. After the name was encountered in the old literature by Grayum in 1988, and it was decided to see if the species was valid and might still be found growing in the area, A. confertum was quickly rediscovered. As at the time nothing was known about this taxon, it was thought to be a potentially rare endemic in the early 1990s, although it was soon also found to grow in Panama and Nicaragua.

Andrew Henderson, who was compiling the palms for the IUCN for the first worldwide 1997 red list of threatened plants (eventually published in 1998), doubted the validity of the rediscovery of A. confertum at the time, stating "it is possibly conspecific with A. alatum" in his submission about the taxon, as in his 1995 book about the palms of the region, which he used as the main reference. This 1995 book is known for tentatively lumping species, especially Astrocaryum. The information appears to have gotten mixed up when entered into the first IUCN database built in the 1990s, with the entry in the 1998 Red List book being under the heading A. alatum instead of A. confertum. The conservation status of A. confertum was stated to be "indeterminate" overall, and "rare" in Costa Rica and Panama. For more than two decades afterwards this mistake was repeated in the new online versions of the IUCN Red List, only now the conservation status was furthermore mistakenly changed to "lower risk: near threatened".

In the 2020 version of the Red List, the species was deleted from the servers.

In the 2021 version of the Red List, A. alatum has reappeared on the server again after a new assessment was uploaded, this time for the correct species, although now the old assessments for A. confertum have reappeared again, again under the wrong name. The species was now assessed as "near threatened". The author mostly only looked at Costa Rica, where the species is common, but he noted that it might be possible that the species could be said to maybe become rarer if in the future pineapples could be grown in the National Parks in the swamps along the Caribbean coast, and if the reader ignores the map provided by the webpage and pretends A. alatum only grows on a few square kilometres.

=== Protected areas ===
It is probably found in almost all national parks and protected areas within its range. It is very abundant at Tortuguero National Park, where it forms vast palm brakes in the swamps. It is also among the most common trees in Barbilla National Park. It is known to occur in Nicaragua in the Indio Maíz Biological Reserve and Bosawás Biosphere Reserve; in Costa Rica in the Área de Conservación Guanacaste, Caño Negro Wildlife Refuge, Barra del Colorado Wildlife Refuge, La Selva Biological Station, Braulio Carrillo National Park, Jairo Mora Sandoval Gandoca-Manzanillo Mixed Wildlife Refuge, Carara National Park, La Tirimbina Wildlife Refuge, Golfo Dulce Forest Reserve and Corcovado National Park; and in Panama in the Soberanía National Park, Río Chagres National Park, as well as many more. In Costa Rica, the majority of the most important habitat (wetlands) is protected in the Nation Park system. Outside of this system different types of wetlands are being impacted by agriculture, primarily clearance and drainage for rice and sugarcane cultivation along the Tempisque River near the Pacific coast, although it is not entirely clear the brackish flooded areas which this palm preferentially inhabits are the types of swamps which are being drained.
