= Cumare =

Cumare may refer to:

- Cumare (bug), a genus of true bugs in the family Tessaratomidae
- Astrocaryum aculeatum, a palm native to South America and Trinidad.
- Mistress in southern Italian dialects and Italian American slang.
