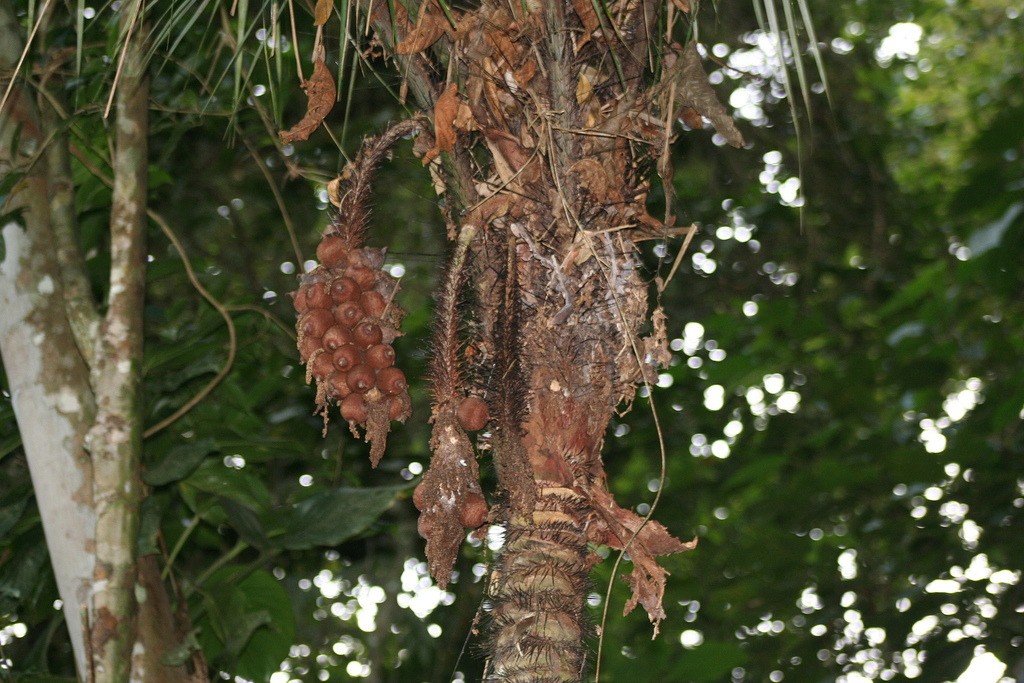
- Astrocaryum aculeatissimum

Scientific classification
- Kingdom: Plantae
- Clade: Tracheophytes
- Clade: Angiosperms
- Clade: Monocots
- Clade: Commelinids
- Order: Arecales
- Family: Arecaceae
- Subfamily: Arecoideae
- Tribe: Cocoseae
- Genus: Astrocaryum; G.Mey.

Type species
- Astrocaryum aculeatum G.Mey.

Species
- See text

Synonyms
- Avoira Giseke; Toxophoenix Schott

= Astrocaryum =

Genus of palms

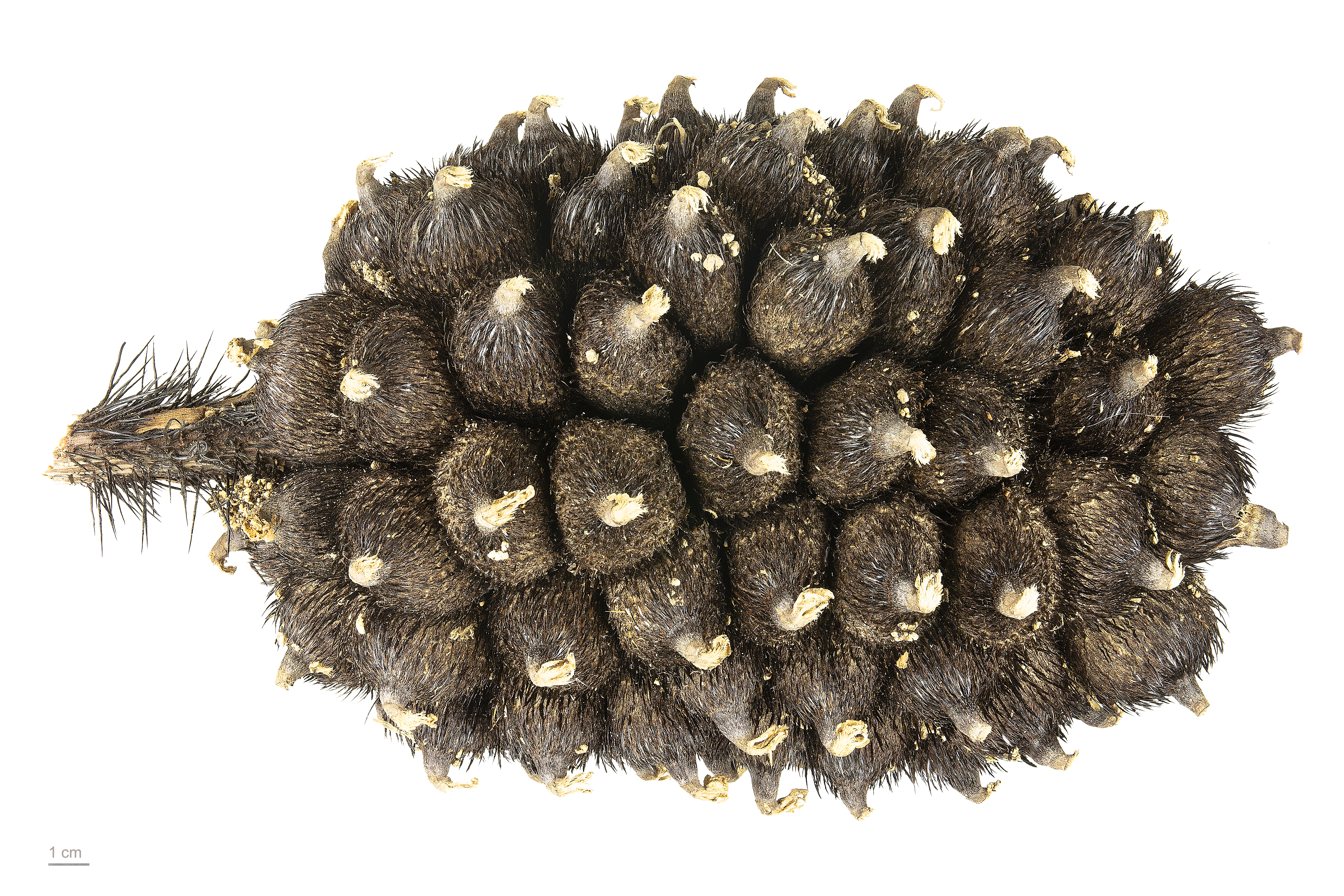
Astrocaryum sciophilum (MHNT)

Astrocaryum is a genus of about 36 to 40 species of palms native to Central and South America and Trinidad.

== Description ==
Astrocaryum is a genus of spiny palms with pinnately compound leaves–rows of leaflets emerge on either side of the axis of the leaf in a feather-like or fern-like pattern. Some species are single-stemmed, while others grow in multi-stemmed (caespitose) clumps. They are pleonanthic—they flower repeatedly over the course of their lifespan—and monoecious, meaning that there are separate male and female flowers, but individuals plants bear both types of flowers.

== Taxonomy ==
=== History ===
The type species, Astrocaryum aculeatum, was first described by German botanist Georg Friedrich Wilhelm Meyer in 1818 based on a specimen from the Essequibo River in Guyana.

=== Species ===
- Astrocaryum acaule Mart.
- Astrocaryum aculeatissimum (Schott) Burret
- Astrocaryum aculeatum G.Mey.
- Astrocaryum alatum Loomis
- Astrocaryum campestre Mart.
- Astrocaryum carnosum F.Kahn & B.Millán
- Astrocaryum chambira Burret
- Astrocaryum chonta Mart.
- Astrocaryum ciliatum F.Kahn & B.Millán
- Astrocaryum confertum H.Wendl. ex Burret
- Astrocaryum faranae F.Kahn & E.Ferreira
- Astrocaryum farinosum Barb.Rodr.
- Astrocaryum ferrugineum F.Kahn & B.Millán
- Astrocaryum giganteum Barb.Rodr.
- Astrocaryum gratum F.Kahn & B.Millán
- Astrocaryum gynacanthum Mart.
- Astrocaryum huaimi Mart.
- Astrocaryum huicungo Dammer ex Burret
- Astrocaryum jauari Mart.
- Astrocaryum javarense (Trail) Drude
- Astrocaryum macrocalyx Burret
- Astrocaryum malybo H.Karst.
- Astrocaryum mexicanum Liebm. ex Mart.
- Astrocaryum minus Trail
- Astrocaryum murumuru Mart.
- Astrocaryum paramaca Mart.
- Astrocaryum perangustatum F.Kahn & B.Millán
- Astrocaryum rodriguesii Trail
- Astrocaryum sciophilum (Miq.) Pulle
- Astrocaryum scopatum F.Kahn & B.Millán
- Astrocaryum sociale Barb.Rodr.
- Astrocaryum standleyanum L.H.Bailey
- Astrocaryum triandrum Galeano-Garces, R.Bernal & F.Kahn
- Astrocaryum ulei Burret
- Astrocaryum urostachys Burret
- Astrocaryum vulgare Mart.

One well known member of the genus is Astrocaryum vulgare, typical in the Pará state of Brazil. Astrocaryum mexicanum, a common palm of the Caribbean coast of Central America, is known as warree cohune in Brazil, as its spines are said to resemble the bristles of the white-lipped peccary or warree.

== Uses ==
The fruit and seeds of several species are used for human food, oil production and fish bait. Leaves are used as a source of fibre and stems as building material. Species are also used medicinally and as a source of palm heart.
