= Astrocaryum perangustatum =

Scientific classification
- Kingdom: Plantae
- Clade: Tracheophytes
- Clade: Angiosperms
- Clade: Monocots
- Clade: Commelinids
- Order: Arecales
- Family: Arecaceae
- Genus: Astrocaryum
- Species: A. perangustatum

Binomial name
- Astrocaryum perangustatum F.Kahn & B.Millán

Species of palm tree

Astrocaryum perangustatum is a species of palm tree in the genus Astrocaryum. It has a tall stem and relatively short leaves. The species was scientifically described and named in 1992 by Francis Kahn and Betty Millán. The botanist Andrew Henderson published a description of it as a variety of Astrocaryum murumuru in 1995, but this has not been accepted by other botanists.
