= Bactris campestris =

Scientific classification
- Kingdom: Plantae
- Clade: Embryophytes
- Clade: Tracheophytes
- Clade: Spermatophytes
- Clade: Angiosperms
- Clade: Monocots
- Clade: Commelinids
- Order: Arecales
- Family: Arecaceae
- Genus: Bactris
- Species: B. campestris

Binomial name
- Bactris campestris Poepp. ex Mart.

Synonyms
- Bactris leptocarpa Trail ex Thurn; Bactris savannarum Britton; Bactris lanceolata Burret

Species of palm

Bactris campestris is a small (1–5 m tall) spiny palm which grows in multi-stemmed clumps in savannas and low forests in northern South America from Colombia to the Guianas, Trinidad and Tobago, and northern Brazil.

== Description ==
Bactris campestris grows in small, multi-stemmed clumps. The stems, which are 1–5 metres (3 ft 3 in – 16 ft 5 in) tall and 3–4 centimetres (1.2–1.6 in) in diameter, are often sheathed by the remains of old leaf bases. Stems usually bear between two and five leaves which are covered with flattened greyish-brown spines 2–4 centimetres (0.79–1.57 in) in length. The leaf sheath and petiole are densely covered with spines; those on the rachis are less dense and grow mostly on the lower surface. The leaf sheath is 24–50 centimetres (9.4–19.7 in) long, the petiole 15–90 centimetres (5.9–35.4 in) and the rachis 60–110 centimetres (24–43 in). Each leaf consists of 17 to 32 leaflets which clustered in groups of two to five. The largest of the leaflets are 25–52 centimetres (9.8–20.5 in) long and 1.5–5 centimetres (0.59–1.97 in) broad.

The inflorescence consists of a 13–20 centimetres (5.1–7.9 in)-long peduncle and 1–6 centimetres (0.39–2.36 in)-long rachis, off of which branches between eight and 39 rachillae 5–15 centimetres (2.0–5.9 in) long. The rachillae bear male and female flowers. Female flowers grow in triplets, with one female flower flanked by two male flowers. Elsewhere along the rachillae, male flowers grow either singly or in pairs. The male flowers are 3–5 millimetres (0.12–0.20 in) long while the female flowers are 3–3.5 millimetres (0.12–0.14 in) in length. The fruit are red or orange-red in colour, 0.5–1 centimetre (0.20–0.39 in) in diameter.

== Taxonomy ==
As a member of the genus Bactris, B. campestris is placed in the subfamily Arecoideae, the tribe Cocoseae and the subtribe Bactridinae. Henderson divided Bactris into six informal groups, and placed B. campestris in the Orange-fruited group. (Henderson did not consider these groups to be monophyletic, using them, instead, for convenience.) In a study of 13 species in the genus Bactris, Wolf Eiserhardt and colleagues found that, based on plastid and nuclear DNA, B. campestris was most closely related to B. pliniana.

The species was first described in 1837 by German Eduard Friedrich Poeppig in Carl Friedrich Philipp von Martius's Historia naturalis palmarum, based on a specimen collected by Poeppig in Brazil. In 1884 James Trail described B. leptocarpa in an article by Everard F. im Thurn, based on a specimen collected by im Thurn in Guyana. In 1923 Nathaniel Lord Britton described B. savannarum, based on a specimen collected by Britton in Trinidad. Finally, in 1930 Max Burret described B. lanceolata, based on a Brazilian specimen. All of these are now considered to belong to the same species.

== Distribution ==
Bactris campestris ranges from eastern Colombia, across Venezuela, north to Trinidad and Tobago, across Guyana, Suriname and French Guiana, and into northern Brazil. It grows in open habitats—generally savannas and low-stature forests—on white sands, at low elevations.

== Uses ==
The palm heart of B. campestris is reportedly used to treat snake bites.
