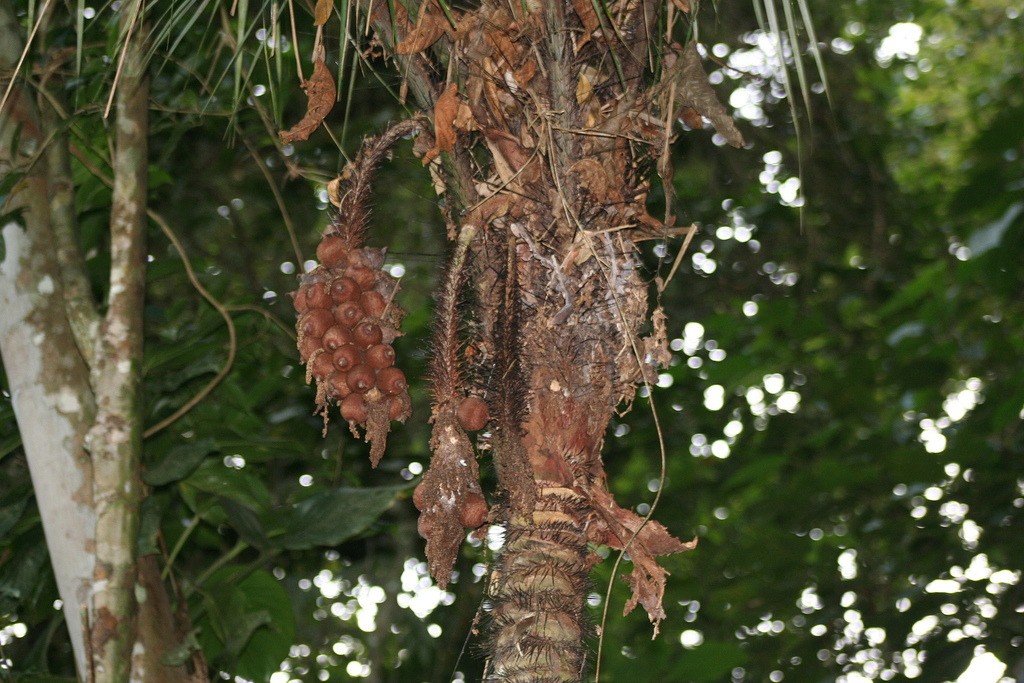

Conservation status
- Least Concern (IUCN 2.3)

Scientific classification
- Kingdom: Plantae
- Clade: Tracheophytes
- Clade: Angiosperms
- Clade: Monocots
- Clade: Commelinids
- Order: Arecales
- Family: Arecaceae
- Genus: Astrocaryum
- Species: A. aculeatissimum

Binomial name
- Astrocaryum aculeatissimum (Schott) Burret

= Astrocaryum aculeatissimum =

Species of palm

Astrocaryum aculeatissimum (syn. Astrocaryum ayri Mart., Toxophoenix aculeatissima Schott) is a palm native to Atlantic Coast restingas vegetation, which is an ecosystem of Atlantic Forest biome in Brazil. This plant has a commercial value because it has useful fibers which may be used to make production of brooms.

The trunk of the tree is covered by rings of very sharp spines, believed by some biologists to have evolved as protection against the extinct Megatherium giant ground sloth.
