= Barfod =

Barfod is a surname. Notable people with the surname include:

- Hakon Barfod (1926–2013), Norwegian sailor
- Line Barfod (born 1964), Danish lawyer and politician
- Tomas Barfod, Danish drummer

== See also ==
- Ludvig Birkedal-Barfod (1850–1937), Danish classical organist and composer
- Barfod v. Denmark
