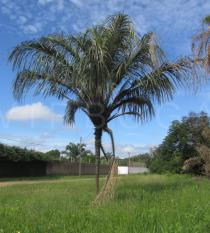

Scientific classification
- Kingdom: Plantae
- Clade: Tracheophytes
- Clade: Angiosperms
- Clade: Monocots
- Clade: Commelinids
- Order: Arecales
- Family: Arecaceae
- Genus: Astrocaryum
- Species: A. aculeatum

Binomial name
- Astrocaryum aculeatum G.Mey.

Synonyms
- Astrocaryum tucuma Mart. Astrocaryum aureum Griseb. & H.Wendl. in Griseb. Astrocaryum candescens Barb.Rodr. Astrocaryum princeps Barb.Rodr. Astrocaryum jucuma Linden; Astrocaryum princeps var. aurantiacum Barb.Rodr. Astrocaryum princeps var. flavum Barb.Rodr. Astrocaryum princeps var. sulphureum Barb.Rodr. Astrocaryum princeps var. vitellinum Barb.Rodr. Astrocaryum manaoense Barb.Rodr. Astrocaryum macrocarpum Huber

= Astrocaryum aculeatum =

Species of palm

Astrocaryum aculeatum (known in Brazilian Portuguese as tucumã, acaiúra, acuiuru, coco-tucumã, tucum, tucumã-açu, tucumã-macaw, tucum-açu, tucumaí-da-terra-firme, tucumãí-uaçu, tucumã-piririca, tucumã-purupuru or tucumã-do-mato) is a palm native to tropical South America and Trinidad. It grows up to 15 m (49 ft) tall and is usually solitary. It has ascending leaves, erect inflorescence, and yellow fruit.

== Etymology ==
tucumã derives from tuku'mã in the Tupi language.

== Taxonomy ==
Astrocaryum aculeatum was first described by German botanist Georg Friedrich Wilhelm Meyer in 1818 based on a specimen from the Essequibo River in Guyana.

== Distribution ==
Astrocaryum aculeatum is found in and around the Amazon Basin, from Trinidad and Tobago in the north, through Venezuela, Guyana, Suriname, the Brazilian states of Acre, Amazonas, Pará, Rondônia, Roraima and south through the Bolivian departments of Beni, Pando, Santa Cruz.

== Uses ==
This plant has edible fruit which may be used for making a kind of juice. It is also used to make a symbolic ring called a tucum ring. Tucum ring is mainly used in Catholic church as a symbol of commitment in social justice, peace building and ecology.

A fiber is extracted from the leaves for making hammocks and ropes that resist salt water.

== Oil ==
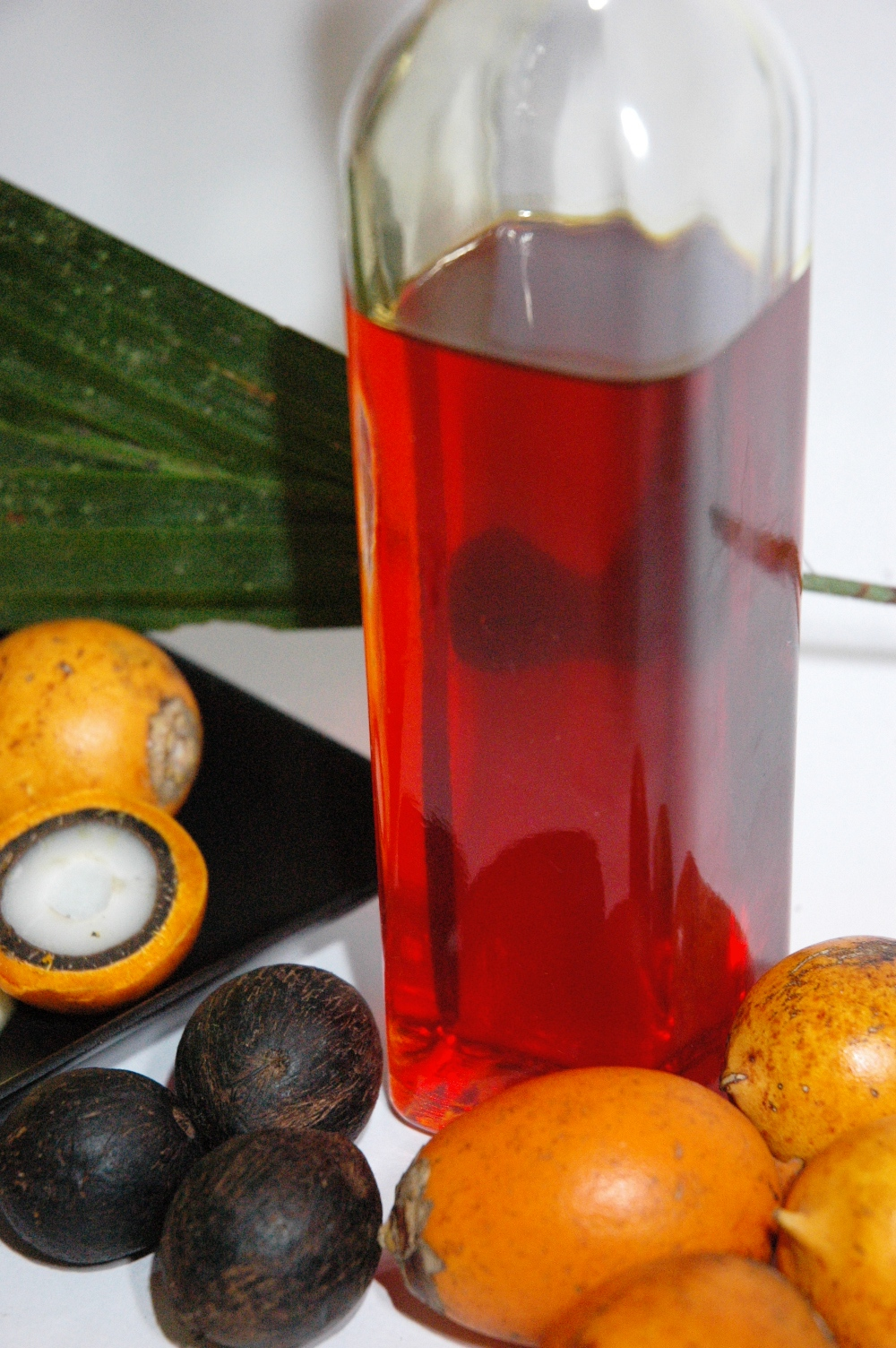
Tucuma oil and fruit

The fruit of tucumã is composed of a woody core almost black in color, containing the white paste of the seed (colloquially called an almond in Brazil) and covered with a yellow-orange pulp. Two types of oils are produced from this fruit: the oil of the external pulp and the almond oil.

The oil extracted from the pulp contains 25.6% saturated fatty acids and 74.4% unsaturated fatty acids composed of palmitic, stearic, oleic, and linoleic acids. It can be used as an emollient. The value of beta-carotene (which is 180 to 330 milligrams/100g oil) is more concentrated in the oil than in the pulp.

Fatty acid composition of the oil Tucumã (Pulp)	
Palmitic	27,7%
Oleic	65,67%
Linoleic	3,65%
Linolenic	4,97%

=== Cosmetic industry ===
The tucuma pulp oil could in the future be used to manufacture soap, body lotions or hair care products.

Physico-chemical data

Index	Unity	Reference values
Free fatty acids	%	1.4562
Refractive Index	-	1.4562
Index of Iodine	gl2 / 100g	82
Saponification value	mg KOH / g	188.4
Materia unsaponifiable	%	1,4
Acidity	mgKOH / g	2.58
Index of Peroxide	meq / kg	1.72
Density	g / L	0.982
Melting	°C	27-35
