= Astrocaryum urostachys =

Conservation status
- Least Concern (IUCN 3.1)

Scientific classification
- Kingdom: Plantae
- Clade: Tracheophytes
- Clade: Angiosperms
- Clade: Monocots
- Clade: Commelinids
- Order: Arecales
- Family: Arecaceae
- Genus: Astrocaryum
- Species: A. urostachys

Binomial name
- Astrocaryum urostachys Burret

Species of palm

Astrocaryum urostachys is a species of flowering plant in the family Arecaceae. It is found only in Ecuador. Its natural habitat is subtropical or tropical moist lowland forests.
