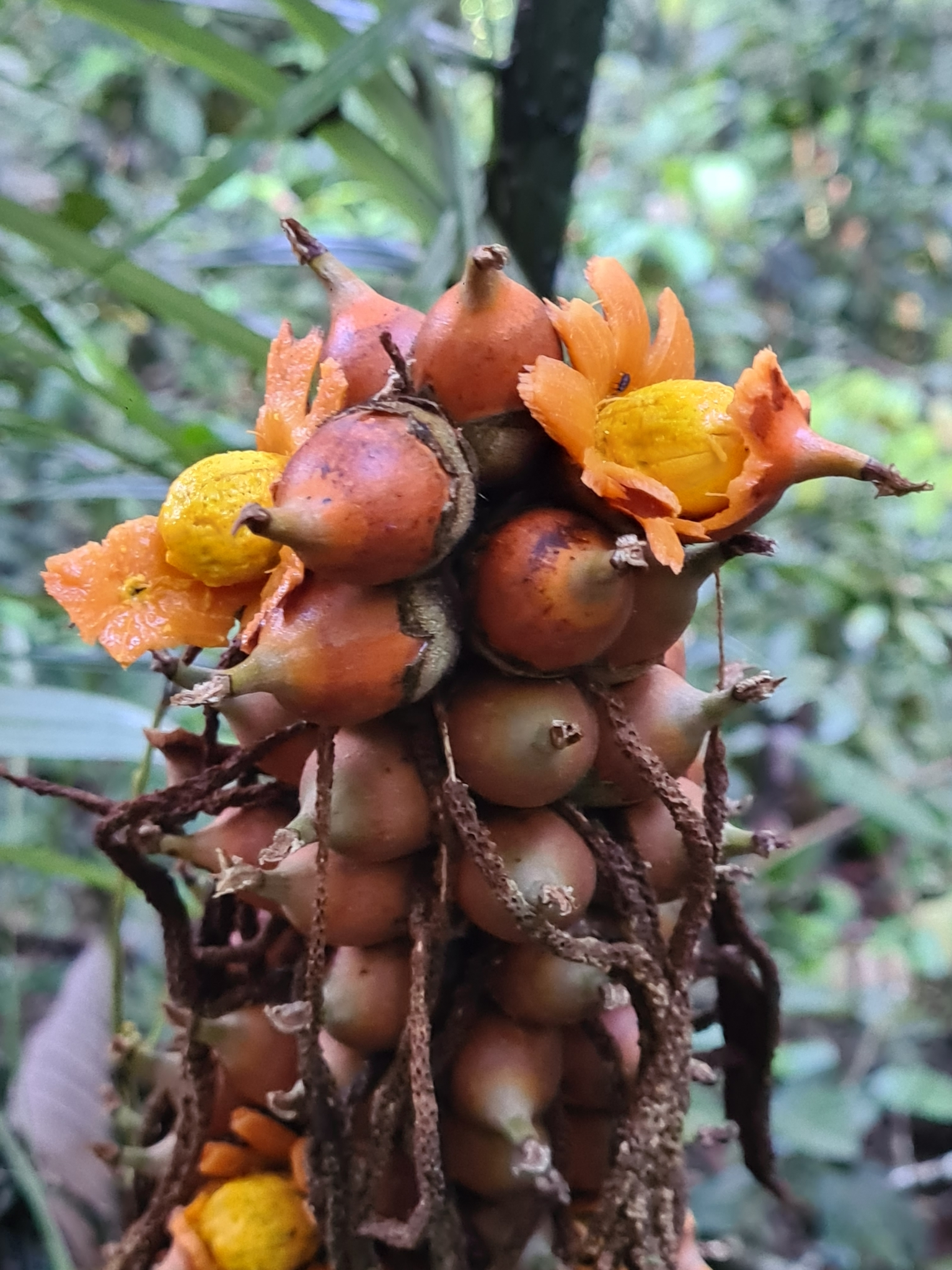

Scientific classification
- Kingdom: Plantae
- Clade: Tracheophytes
- Clade: Angiosperms
- Clade: Monocots
- Clade: Commelinids
- Order: Arecales
- Family: Arecaceae
- Genus: Astrocaryum
- Species: A. paramaca

Binomial name
- Astrocaryum paramaca Mart.

= Astrocaryum paramaca =

Species of plant

Astrocaryum paramaca is a species from the genus Astrocaryum.
