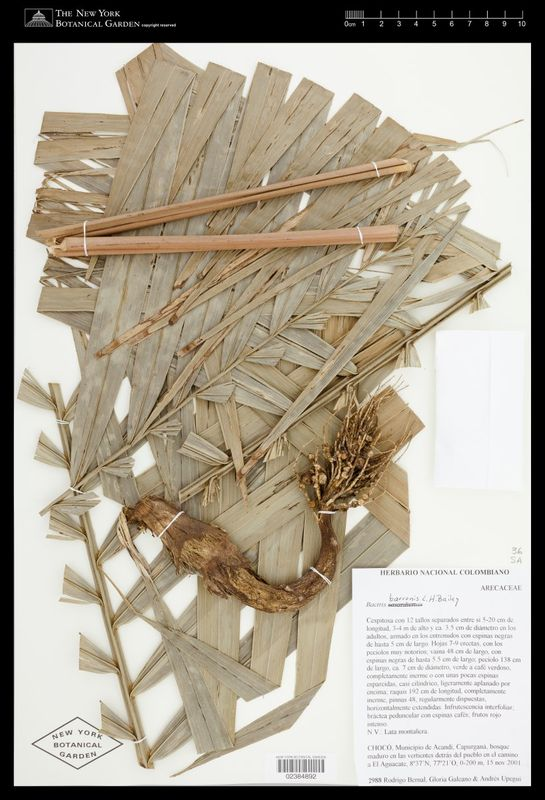

Conservation status
- Least Concern (IUCN 3.1)

Scientific classification
- Kingdom: Plantae
- Clade: Tracheophytes
- Clade: Angiosperms
- Clade: Monocots
- Clade: Commelinids
- Order: Arecales
- Family: Arecaceae
- Genus: Bactris
- Species: B. barronis

Binomial name
- Bactris barronis L.H.Bailey

= Bactris barronis =

Species of flowering plant

Bactris barronis is a species of flowering plant in the family Arecaceae. It is a shrub or tree with spikes, and orange-red fruits. The species is native to Colombia and Panama.

Bactris barronis was described in 1933, and is listed as of Least Concern by the IUCN.

== Taxonomy ==
The species was described by Liberty Hyde Bailey in 1933.

== Distribution ==
Bactris barronis is native to the wet tropical biome of eastern Panama (Colón, Darién, Panamá and Guna Yala) and western Colombia (Antioquia, Bolívar, Chocó, and Valle del Cauca). It grows at elevations of up to 1,700 metres (5,600 ft).

== Description ==
Bactris barronis is a shrub or tree. It grows 2.5–8 metres (8.2–26.2 ft) high. The trunk is 4–6 centimetres (1.6–2.4 in) wide, and ringed with black spikes, which are 1–4 centimetres (0.39–1.57 in) long. The stems form small clumps.

The plant has four to nine leaves, which are grey-green, can be over 2 metres (6.6 ft) long, and have thirty-one to forty-five pinnae on each side. The leaf stems are slender, and can be over 1 metre (3.3 ft) long. The lower part of the stem has prominent spikes.

The inflorescence grows on a 16–25 centimetres (6.3–9.8 in) long stem, which is curved and spiny. The female flowers are 3–6 millimetres (0.12–0.24 in) long. The calyx is cup-shaped, and up to 1 millimetre (0.039 in) long. The corolla is tube-shaped, and 3.5 millimetres (0.14 in) long.

The fruit is 1–1.6 centimetres (0.39–0.63 in) wide, broadly turbinate or shortly pear-shaped, and ripens from dark green to orange-red. The mesocarp is starchy, and the endocarp is turbinate.

== Uses ==
Bactris barronis is used for food, and has social uses.

== Conservation ==
In 2022, the IUCN assessed Bactris barronis as of Least Concern.

== Nomenclature ==
In Spanish, Bactris barronis is known as Maquenque, Lata Montañera, Lata, Jingapá, Chontadurillo, Chascarrá, Chascaray, or Caña conga.
