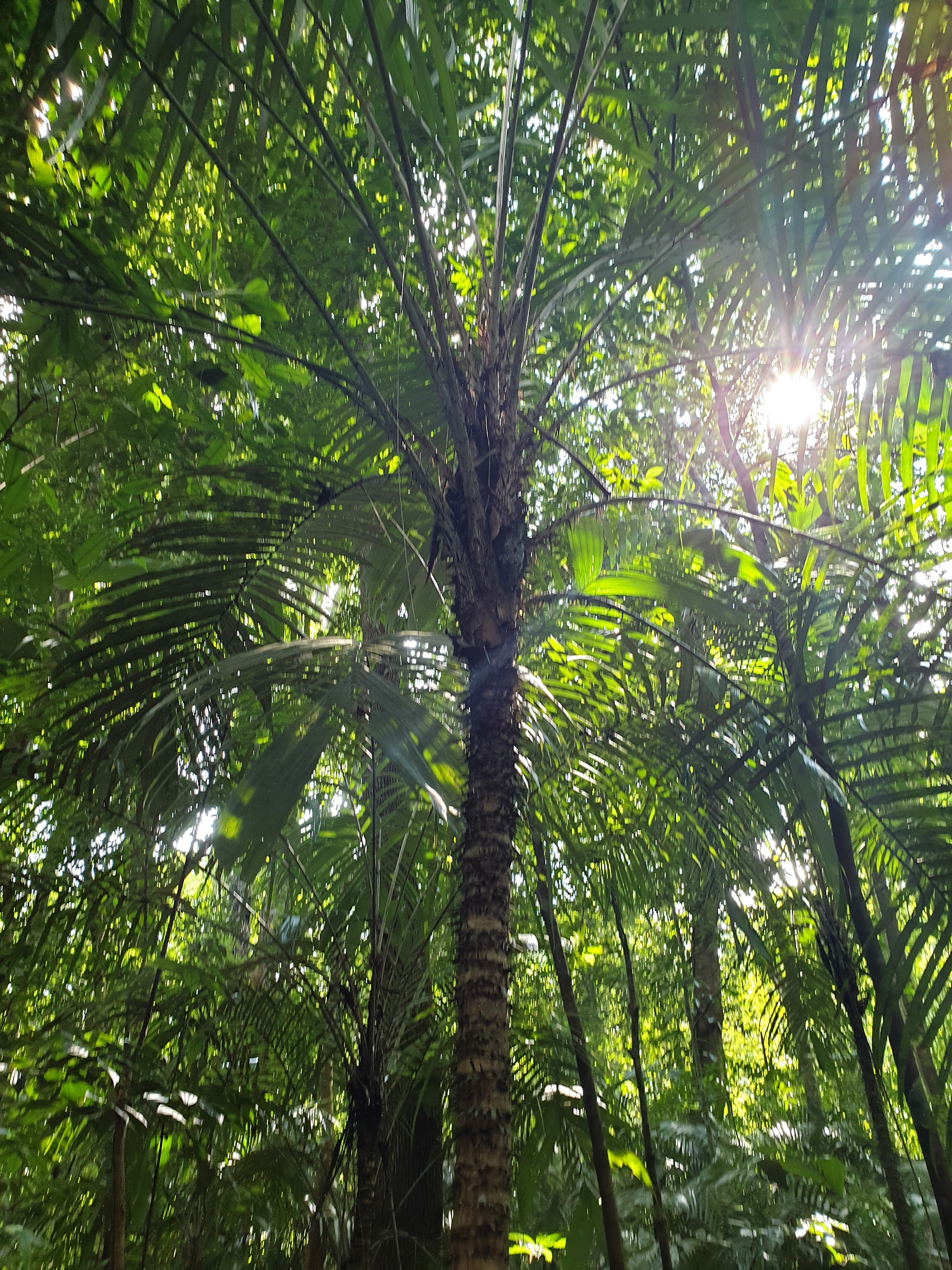

Conservation status
- Least Concern (IUCN 3.1)

Scientific classification
- Kingdom: Plantae
- Clade: Embryophytes
- Clade: Tracheophytes
- Clade: Spermatophytes
- Clade: Angiosperms
- Clade: Monocots
- Clade: Commelinids
- Order: Arecales
- Family: Arecaceae
- Genus: Bactris
- Species: B. mexicana

Binomial name
- Bactris mexicana Mart.

Varieties
- Bactris mexicana var. mexicana; Bactris mexicana var. trichophylla (Burret) A.J.Hend.

= Bactris mexicana =

Species of flowering plant

Bactris mexicana is a species of flowering plant in the family Arecaceae. It is native to Mexico and central America.

Bactris mexicana is a palm tree with spiny stems, compound leaves, and orange, egg-shaped fruits. It was described in 1844, and is considered Least Concern by the International Union for Conservation of Nature.

== Taxonomy ==
The species was described by Carl Friedrich Philipp von Martius in 1844.

Two varieties are recognised:

- Bactris mexicana var. mexicana - Native to Mexico
- Bactris mexicana var. trichophylla - native to Belize, Guatemala, Honduras, and Nicaragua

== Distribution ==
Bactris mexicana is native to the wet tropical biome of Belize, Guatemala, Honduras, Mexico, and Nicaragua. It is present in the south-east, south-west, and Gulf regions of Mexico. It grows at elevations of up to 500 metres (1,600 ft). The species' estimated extent of occurrence is 400,557.724 square kilometres (154,656.202 sq mi).

Bactris mexicana grows on moist and rocky soils, in wet forests, sub-evergreen high forests, and montane rainforests.

== Description ==
Bactris mexicana is a palm tree that can grow up to 3 metres (9.8 ft) high. The stems are 2–3.5 centimetres (0.79–1.38 in) wide, and are usually spiny.

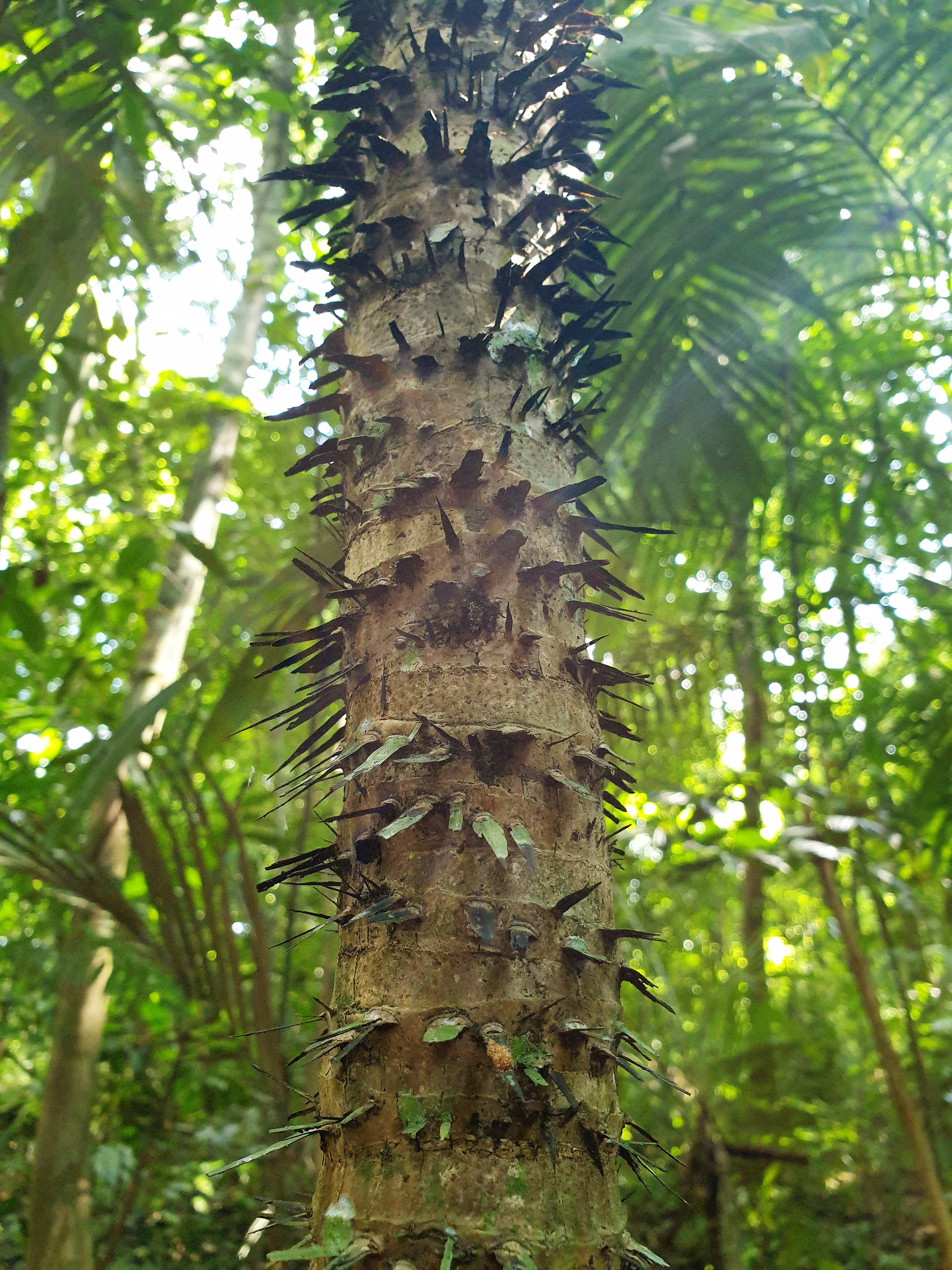
Bactris mexicana stems have spines.

The leaf stems are 35–100 centimetres (1.15–3.28 ft) long. The leaves are compound, and have eight to twenty-nine pinnae. The pinnae are arranged into irregular clusters.

The male flowers are 2–4.5 millimetres (0.079–0.177 in) long, and have six stamens. The sepals have 1 millimetre (0.039 in) lobes. The petals are 3–4 millimetres (0.12–0.16 in) long. The female flowers are 3–5 millimetres (0.12–0.20 in) long. The calyx is cup shaped, and up to 1 millimetre (0.039 in) long. The corolla is tube-shaped, and 3–4 millimetres (0.12–0.16 in) long.

The fruits are orange, egg-shaped, 0.8–1.2 centimetres (0.31–0.47 in) long, and 0.9–1.2 centimetres (0.35–0.47 in) wide. The mesocarp is powdery. The endocarp is shaped like a spinning top or beetroot, and is pitted on top.

== Ecology ==
The plant is eaten by Desmarest's spiny pocket mouse.

== Uses ==
Local people use Bactris mexicana to make baskets and furniture.

== Conservation ==
In 2021, the IUCN assessed Bactris mexicana as of Least Concern. The population is large and stable. In some parts of its range, the species is affected by deforestation. However, it is tolerant to disturbance.

The species is present in protected areas, including the Rio Bravo Conservation and Management Area, the Mountain Pine Ridge Forest Reserve, the Maya Biosphere Reserve, Pico Bonito National Park, the Los Tuxtlas Biosphere Reserve, the Montes Azules Biosphere Reserve, and the Laguna de Términos flora and fauna protection area.

== Nomenclature ==
In Spanish, the species is known as jaguacté, or chiquiyul. In Huastec, the species is known as cóyol. In Tzeltal, the species is known as chapay.
