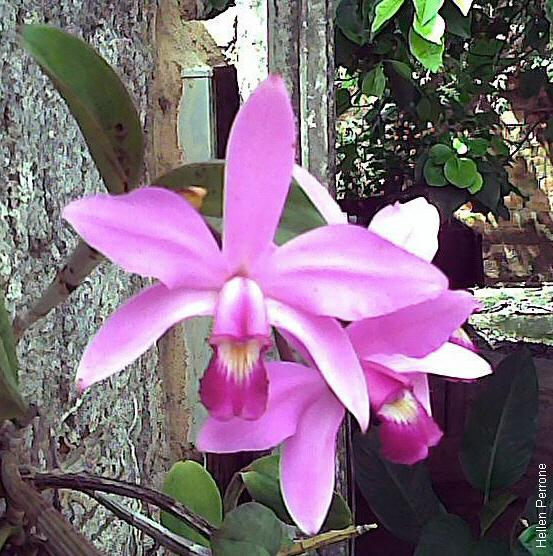

Scientific classification
- Kingdom: Plantae
- Clade: Tracheophytes
- Clade: Angiosperms
- Clade: Monocots
- Order: Asparagales
- Family: Orchidaceae
- Subfamily: Epidendroideae
- Genus: Cattleya
- Subgenus: Cattleya subg. Intermediae
- Species: C. violacea

Binomial name
- Cattleya violacea (Kunth) Rolfe

Synonyms
- Cymbidium violaceum Kunth; Epidendrum violaceum (Kunth) Rchb.f.; Cattleya schomburgkii Lodd. ex Lindl.; Cattleya superba M.R. Schomb. ex Lindl.; Cattleya odoratissima P.N. Don; Epidendrum superbum (M.R. Schomb. ex Lindl.) Rchb.f.; Cattleya superba var. splendens Lem.; Cattleya superba var. alba Rolfe; Cattleya superba var. wellsiana auct.; Cattleya superba var. ashworthii auct.; Cattleya violacea var. huebneri Schltr.; Cattleya violacea var. alba (Rolfe) Fowlie; Cattleya violacea var. splendens (Lem.) Fowlie; Cattleya violacea var. ashworthii (auct.) Braem; Cattleya violacea var. wellsiana (auct.) Braem; Cattleya violacea f. alba (Rolfe) Christenson

= Cattleya violacea =

Species of orchid

Cattleya violacea is a species of orchid native to the lowland rainforests of the Amazon and Orinoco river basins, being the most widespread of all Cattleya species in the wild. C. Violacea has been found throughout northern South America. Orchids of this species grow on trees along rivers, as they require heat and moisture year round.

== Seed Characteristics ==
Seed Coat: Cattleya Violacea seeds have a reticulate seed coat, characterized by a network-like pattern. The seed has a micropylar end (opened end) and a chalazal end (closed end).

== Germination and Growth Process ==
The germination process likely involves the absorption of water through the micropyle, triggering the initiation of growth. It has elongated pseudobulbs that become grooved as they mature, covered at the base by papery sheaths that disappear over time. During late spring and early summer, it produces fragrant flowers on a tall, reddish stem with a few to several blooms. The flowers open flat and last a long time, emerging from a newly formed pseudobulb.

== Growth Conditions ==
Cattleya Violacea primarily grows in the overstory, a study in southern Venezuela found it to be the 3rd most abundant plant in the forest overstory.Cattleya violacea has also observed as an epiphytic orchid associated with small trees in the forest surrounding a rocky hill.

Sucrose Concentration: Studies have shown that sucrose concentration significantly affects Cattleya violacea growth.

Ideal Environment: Soil with 20-30 grams of sucrose is considered the ideal environment for Cattleya seeds to grow.

Effects of Sucrose: Absence of sucrose or excessively high concentrations can be detrimental to plant growth.

Optimal Concentration: The concentration of 27 g L-1 of sucrose has been found to provide the highest in vitro growth, enabling efficient mass propagation.

== Genetic Diversity Study ==
A study in the Amazonian Jungle analyzed the genetic diversity of orchid species, including Cattleya Violacea found no clear correlation between supposed origin and flower color.

== Presence in Cartagena del Chaira ==
Geographic Location: Cattleya violacea has been found in Cartagena del Chaira, a municipality in the department of Caquetá, Colombia.

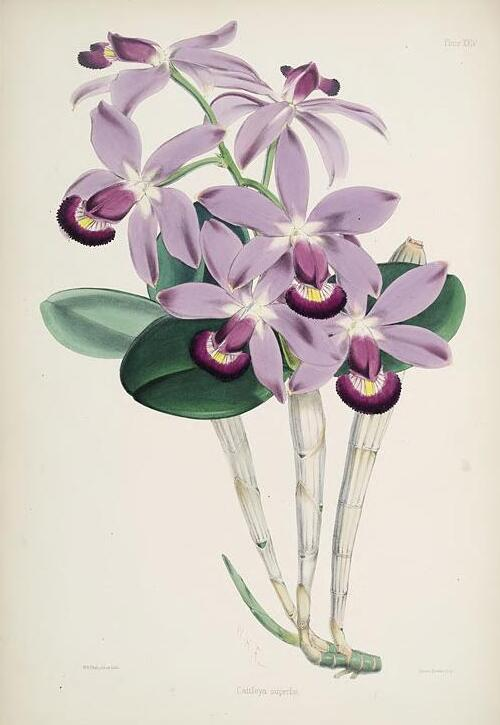
Illustration made between 1862 and 1865

Introduction Hypothesis: There are doubts about the natural distribution of these species in La Laguna del Chaira. It is suspected that they were introduced during a massive effort to bring orchids to the area in the 1980s.

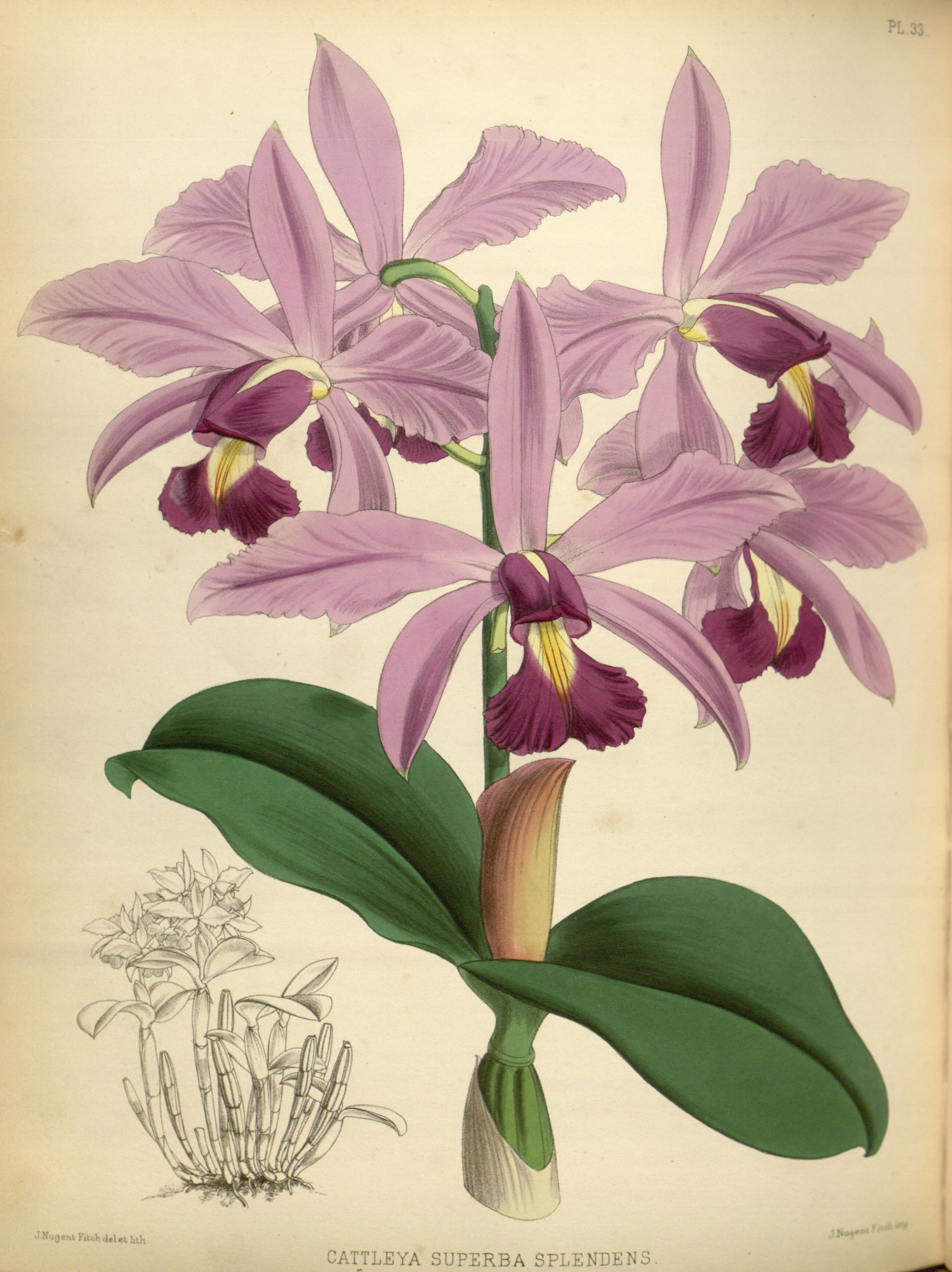
Colored Illustration of a Cattleya Violacea
