= Astrocaryum minus =

Conservation status
- Critically Endangered (IUCN 2.3)

Scientific classification
- Kingdom: Plantae
- Clade: Tracheophytes
- Clade: Angiosperms
- Clade: Monocots
- Clade: Commelinids
- Order: Arecales
- Family: Arecaceae
- Genus: Astrocaryum
- Species: A. minus

Binomial name
- Astrocaryum minus Trail

Species of palm

Astrocaryum minus is a species of flowering plant in the family Arecaceae. It is found in Brazil and French Guiana. It is threatened by habitat loss.
