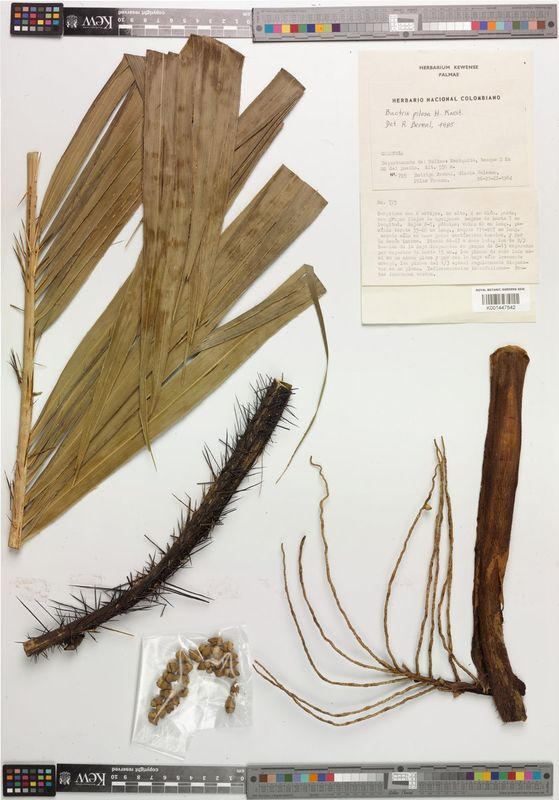

Conservation status
- Least Concern (IUCN 3.1)

Scientific classification
- Kingdom: Plantae
- Clade: Embryophytes
- Clade: Tracheophytes
- Clade: Spermatophytes
- Clade: Angiosperms
- Clade: Monocots
- Clade: Commelinids
- Order: Arecales
- Family: Arecaceae
- Genus: Bactris
- Species: B. pilosa

Binomial name
- Bactris pilosa H.Karst.

Synonyms
- Bactris granatensis (H.Karst.) H.Wendl.; Bactris hirsuta Burret; Guilielma granatensis H.Karst.; Martinezia granatensis W.Bull

= Bactris pilosa =

Species of flowering plant

Bactris pilosa is a species of flowering plant in the family Arecaceae. It is a shrub or tree with spines, four to eight leaves, and purplish-black fruits. The species is native to Colombia, Ecuador, Panama, and Venezuela.

Bactris pilosa was described in 1857, and is listed as of Least Concern by the IUCN.

== Taxonomy ==
The species was described by Gustav Karl Wilhelm Hermann Karsten in 1857.

== Distribution ==
Bactris pilosa is native to the wet tropical biome of Colombia, (Antioquia Department, Bolívar Department, Chocó Department, Córdoba Department, Magdalena Department, Norte de Santander Department, Sucre Department, Tolima Department), Ecuador, (Los Ríos Province), Panama (Darién Province), and Venezuela (Táchira and Zulia). The species grows in lowland forests, at elevations of 100–830 metres (330–2,720 ft).

== Description ==
Bactris pilosa is a shrub or tree. The stems are clustered or rarely solitary, 2–10 metres (6.6–32.8 ft) tall, 2.5–4 centimetres (0.98–1.57 in) wide, and spiny.

The plant has four to eight leaves, which have clustered, cylindrical, yellowish-brown or black spines. The spines are up to 5 centimetres (2.0 in) long. The leaves have fifty-nine to sixty-eight pinnae on each side, which are regularly or irregularly arranged. The leaves are linear, and have stiff tips. The leaf stem is 28–60 centimetres (11–24 in) long.

The flower stem is curved and spiny. The male flowers are 3–5.5 millimetres (0.12–0.22 in) long, and have five to six stamens. The sepal lobes are 1–1.5 millimetres (0.039–0.059 in) long. The petals are 3–5 millimetres (0.12–0.20 in) long. The female flowers are 3–6 millimetres (0.12–0.24 in) long. The calyx is cup-shaped, and 3–5 millimetres (0.12–0.20 in) long. The corolla is urn-shaped, up to 4.5 millimetres (0.18 in) long, and covered in small scales.

The fruits are purple-black, shaped like a flattened egg, 1.3–2.5 centimetres (0.51–0.98 in) long, and 1–2 centimetres (0.39–0.79 in) wide. The fruits are covered in short spines. The mesocarp is juicy, and the endocarp is turbinate.

== Uses ==
The species is used for food.

== Conservation ==
In 2022, the IUCN assessed Bactris pilosa as of Least Concern.

== Nomenclature ==
In Spanish, the species is known as Lata Blanca.
