= Bactris dianeura =

Conservation status
- Least Concern (IUCN 3.1)

Scientific classification
- Kingdom: Plantae
- Clade: Tracheophytes
- Clade: Angiosperms
- Clade: Monocots
- Clade: Commelinids
- Order: Arecales
- Family: Arecaceae
- Genus: Bactris
- Species: B. dianeura

Binomial name
- Bactris dianeura Burret

Species of flowering plant

Bactris dianeura is a species of flowering plant in the family Arecaceae. It is a shrub or tree with spiny stems, pinnate leaves, and bright orange fruits. The species is native to Central America.

Bactris dianeura was described in 1934, and is listed as of Least Concern by the IUCN.

== Taxonomy ==
The species was described by Max Burret in 1934.

== Distribution ==
Bactris dianeura is native to the wet tropical biome of Costa Rica (Alajuela, Cartago, Heredia, Limón, Puntarenas, and San José), Nicaragua (Matagalpa), and Panama (Chiriquí and Veraguas). It grows in premontane rainforests, at elevations of 600–1,650 metres (1,970–5,410 ft).

== Description ==
Bactris dianeura is a shrub or tree. The stems are 2–5 metres (6.6–16.4 ft) tall, 1–3 centimetres (0.39–1.18 in) wide, spiny, and clump in ground of two to eight.

The plant has five to seven leaves, which have scattered black, brown, or reddish spines that are up to 6.5 centimetres (2.6 in) long. The leaves have fourteen to twenty irregularly clustered pinnae on each side. The leaf stem is 26–80 centimetres (10–31 in) long.

The inflorescence stem is curved, spiny, and 6–12.5 centimetres (2.4–4.9 in) long. The male flowers are 3–4 millimetres (0.12–0.16 in) long, have 1–1.5 millimetres (0.039–0.059 in) long sepal lobes, and have six stamens. The female flowers are 3.5–5.5 millimetres (0.14–0.22 in) long, have a cup-shaped, 1–2 millimetres (0.039–0.079 in) long calyx, and have a tube-shaped, 3–5 millimetres (0.12–0.20 in) long corolla.

The fruits are bright orange, subglobose or obovoid, 1.2–1.8 centimetres (0.47–0.71 in) long, and 1.2–1.7 centimetres (0.47–0.67 in) wide. The mesocarp is starchy, and the endocarp is turbinate.

== Conservation ==
In 2018, the IUCN assessed Bactris dianeura as of Least Concern. It has a large population, and faces no major threats.
