= Astrocaryum triandrum =

Conservation status
- Endangered (IUCN 3.1)

Scientific classification
- Kingdom: Plantae
- Clade: Tracheophytes
- Clade: Angiosperms
- Clade: Monocots
- Clade: Commelinids
- Order: Arecales
- Family: Arecaceae
- Genus: Astrocaryum
- Species: A. triandrum

Binomial name
- Astrocaryum triandrum Galeano, Bernal & Kahn

Species of palm

Astrocaryum triandrum is a species of flowering plant in the family Arecaceae. It is found only in Colombia. It is threatened by habitat loss.
