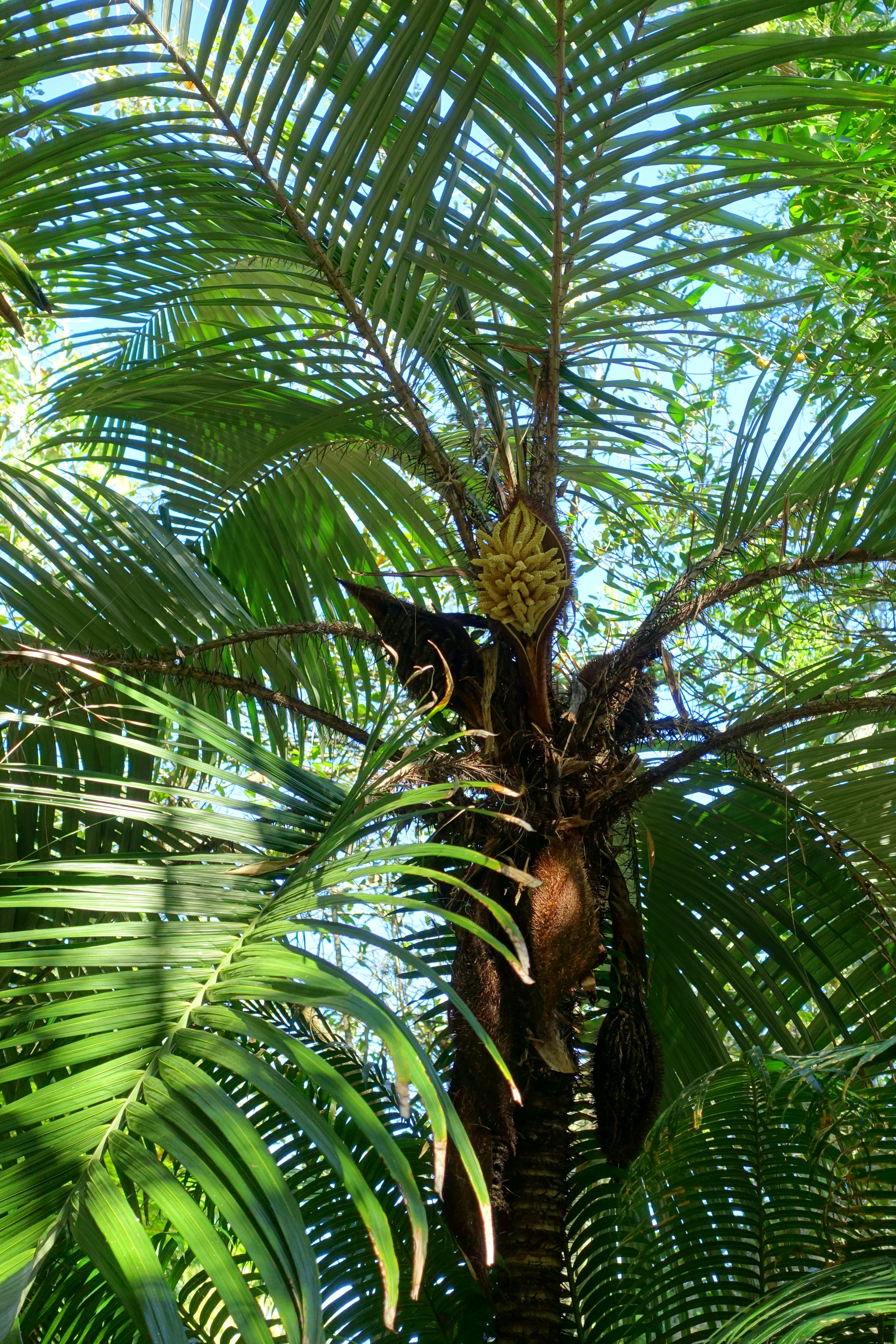
- At the Marie Selby Botanical Gardens
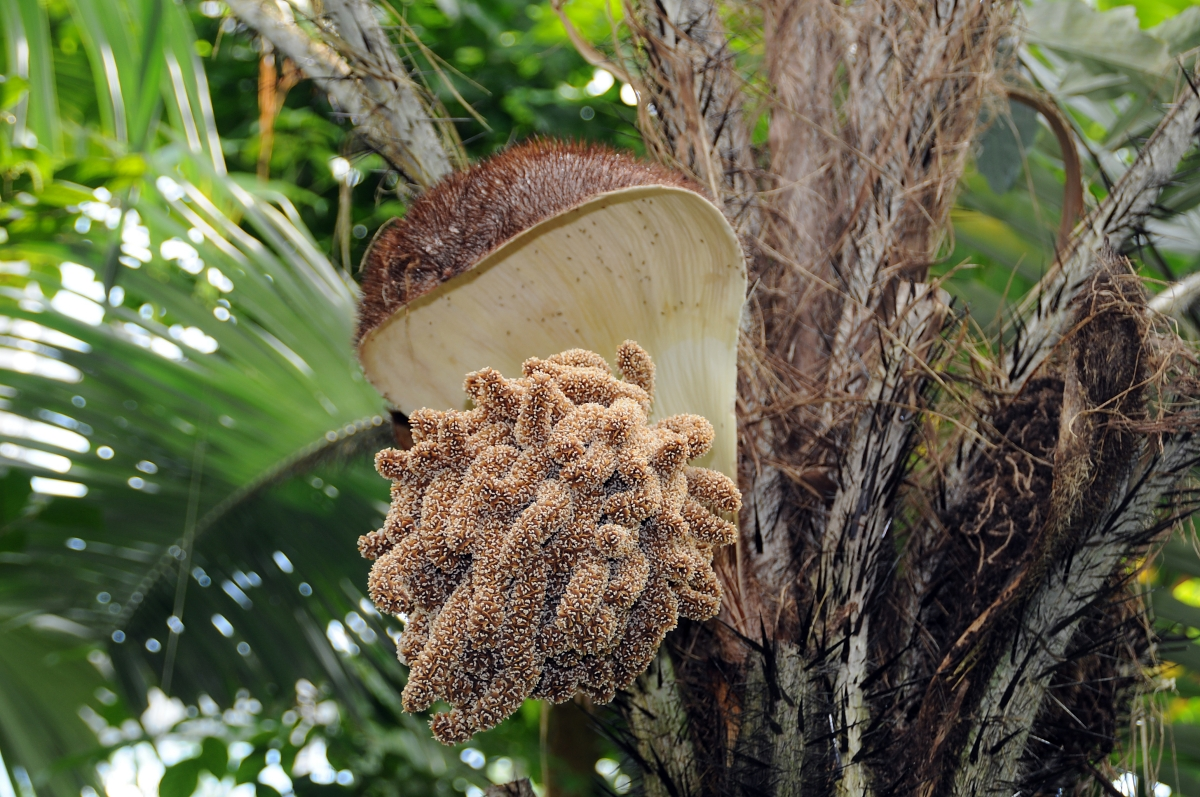
- Even the spathe of the flowers is spiny

Conservation status
- Least Concern (IUCN 3.1)

Scientific classification
- Kingdom: Plantae
- Clade: Tracheophytes
- Clade: Angiosperms
- Clade: Monocots
- Clade: Commelinids
- Order: Arecales
- Family: Arecaceae
- Genus: Astrocaryum
- Species: A. mexicanum

Binomial name
- Astrocaryum mexicanum Liebm. ex Mart.

Synonyms
- List: Astrocaryum chichon Linden; Astrocaryum cohune (S.Watson) Standl.; Astrocaryum rostratum Hook.f.; Astrocaryum warszewiczii H.Karst.; Bactris cohune S.Watson; Hexopetion mexicanum (Liebm. ex Mart.) Burret

= Astrocaryum mexicanum =

Species of palm tree

Astrocaryum mexicanum, the chocho palm, cohune palm, or chapay, is a species of cocosoid palm in the family Arecaceae, native to Mexico and parts of Central America. It is very long-lived for a palm, reaching 140 years. Local people harvest its young inflorescences, its seeds, and its hearts for food. Covered with stout spines, it is hardy to USDA zone 10a, and is occasionally planted as an ornamental in places such as Hawaii and Southern California.
