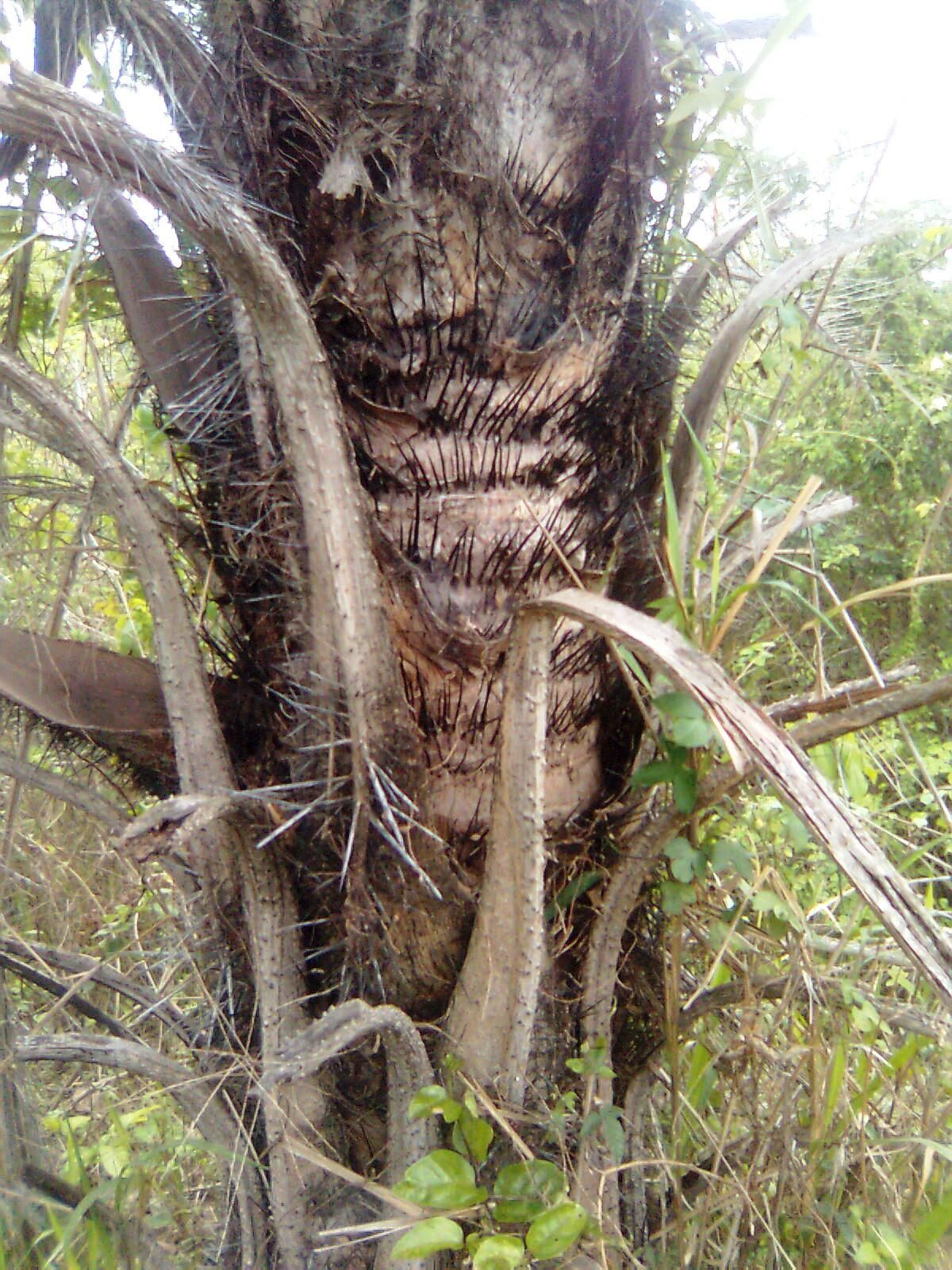
- Trunk of Astrocaryum jauari

Scientific classification
- Kingdom: Plantae
- Clade: Embryophytes
- Clade: Tracheophytes
- Clade: Spermatophytes
- Clade: Angiosperms
- Clade: Monocots
- Clade: Commelinids
- Order: Arecales
- Family: Arecaceae
- Genus: Astrocaryum
- Species: A. jauari

Binomial name
- Astrocaryum jauari Mart.

= Astrocaryum jauari =

Species of palm

Astrocaryum jauari is the most frequently encountered palm native to Amazon rainforest vegetation in the floodplains of the Rio Negro, in Brazil. The fruit is edible. This plant has further commercial value because it may be used in the production of heart of palm. It is one of the most common palms in the flood forests of the Amazon.
