= Astrocaryum faranae =

Scientific classification
- Kingdom: Plantae
- Clade: Tracheophytes
- Clade: Angiosperms
- Clade: Monocots
- Clade: Commelinids
- Order: Arecales
- Family: Arecaceae
- Genus: Astrocaryum
- Species: A. faranae

Binomial name
- Astrocaryum faranae F.Kahn. & E.Ferreira

Species of palm

Astrocaryum faranae is a palm native to Amazon rainforest vegetation in Brazil and Peru. This plant has a commercial value because it has oil seeds which may be used to make cosmetics.
