= Astrocaryum confertum =

Scientific classification
- Kingdom: Plantae
- Clade: Tracheophytes
- Clade: Angiosperms
- Clade: Monocots
- Clade: Commelinids
- Order: Arecales
- Family: Arecaceae
- Genus: Astrocaryum
- Species: A. confertum

Binomial name
- Astrocaryum confertum H.Wendl. ex Burret

Species of flowering plant

Astrocaryum confertum is a species of spiny palm in the family Arecaceae. It is native to the tropical lowlands of northwestern South America, where it occurs in humid forests and riverine habitats. The species is characterized by its densely clustered spines, pinnate leaves, and globose to ovoid fruits, and is locally important as a source of edible fruit and plant material.
