= Astrocaryum ferrugineum =

Scientific classification
- Kingdom: Plantae
- Clade: Tracheophytes
- Clade: Angiosperms
- Clade: Monocots
- Clade: Commelinids
- Order: Arecales
- Family: Arecaceae
- Genus: Astrocaryum
- Species: A. ferrugineum

Binomial name
- Astrocaryum ferrugineum F.Kahn. & B.Millán

Species of palm

Astrocaryum ferrugineum (syn. Astrocaryum murumuru Wallace var. ferrugineum (F.Kahn & B.Millán) A.J.Hend.) is a palm native to Amazon rainforest in Brazil.
