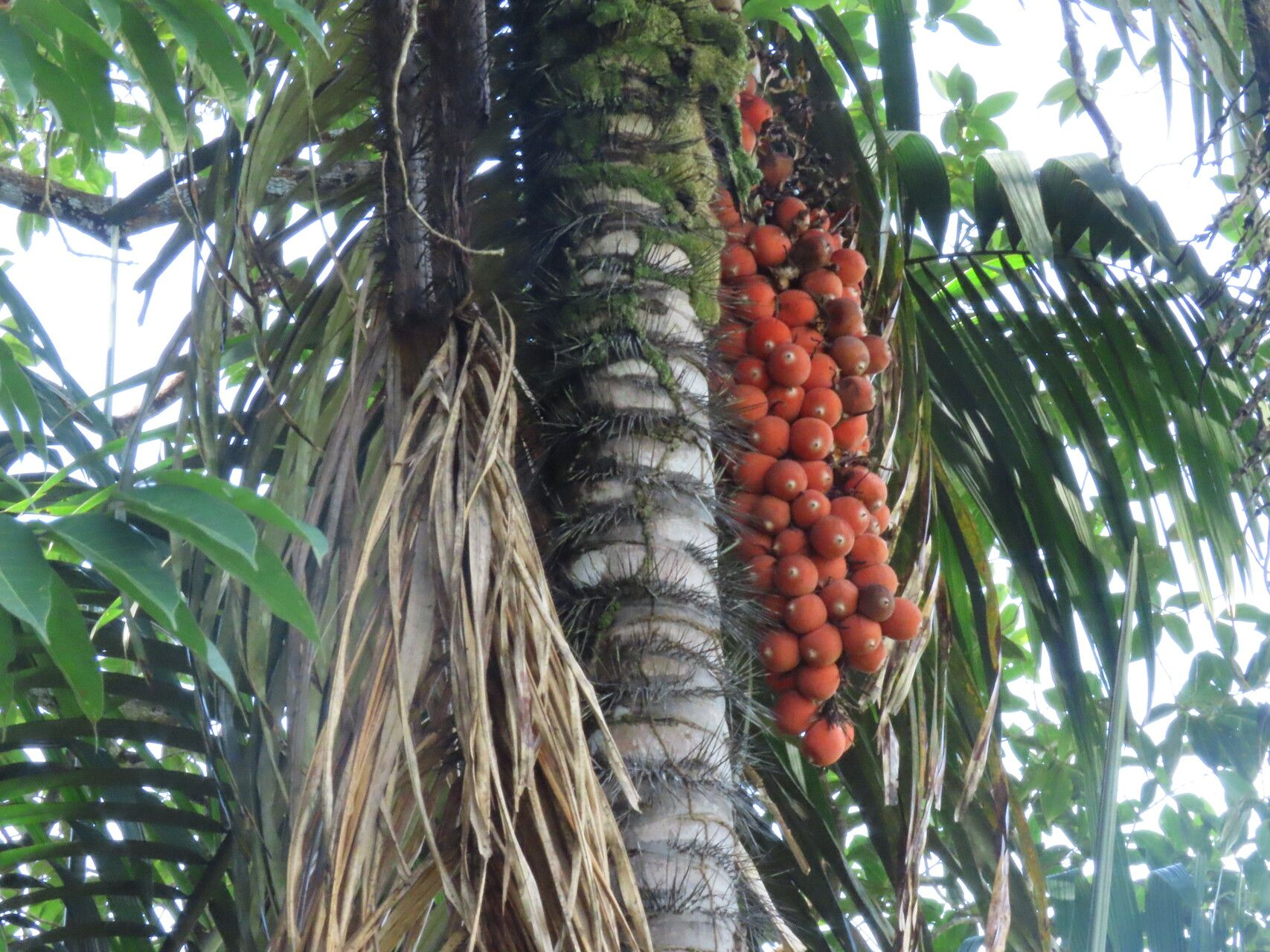
- Fruits

Conservation status
- Least Concern (IUCN 3.1)

Scientific classification
- Kingdom: Plantae
- Clade: Embryophytes
- Clade: Tracheophytes
- Clade: Spermatophytes
- Clade: Angiosperms
- Clade: Monocots
- Clade: Commelinids
- Order: Arecales
- Family: Arecaceae
- Genus: Astrocaryum
- Species: A. standleyanum

Binomial name
- Astrocaryum standleyanum L.H.Bailey

= Astrocaryum standleyanum =

Species of palm

Astrocaryum standleyanum, commonly known as the black palm or chunga, is a species of palm native to Central and South America, where its distribution extends from Costa Rica to Ecuador. It is most common in central Panama, even becoming abundant in the tropical forests around the Panama Canal, but in general it is not a common plant.

== Description ==
This palm grows up to 15 to 20 meters tall. The trunk diameter is up to 18 to 25 centimeters. It is covered densely in sharp, flattened black spines up to 20 centimeters long. The leaf stalks and leaf edges and the peduncles bearing the fruit clusters have smaller spines. One plant is topped with about 15 mature leaves at a time. The pinnate frond is up to 4 meters long and typically palm-like in appearance. It has many leaflets arranged irregularly, clustered and angled. The underside is glaucous. A mature, expanded leaf lasts for about 4.5 years, and the plant grows 3 to 5 new leaves per year. The trunk is patterned with the marks of leaves that have fallen away. The spines are distributed between these leaf scars on the trunk. The plant becomes reproductively mature at 9 to 10 years of age. Flowering occurs during the rainy season. The inflorescence of tiny white flowers grows upright, then bends and hangs as the fruits develop. The fruiting season is in March through June, during which time a mature plant produces about 6 clusters of fruit. The cluster is a hanging spadix, which contains about 500 fruits in optimal conditions. In leaner times a spadix might have only 100 or so. The fruit is made up of a seed up to 3 centimeters wide coated in pulpy, orange flesh. One fruit weighs about 25 grams.

== Ecology ==
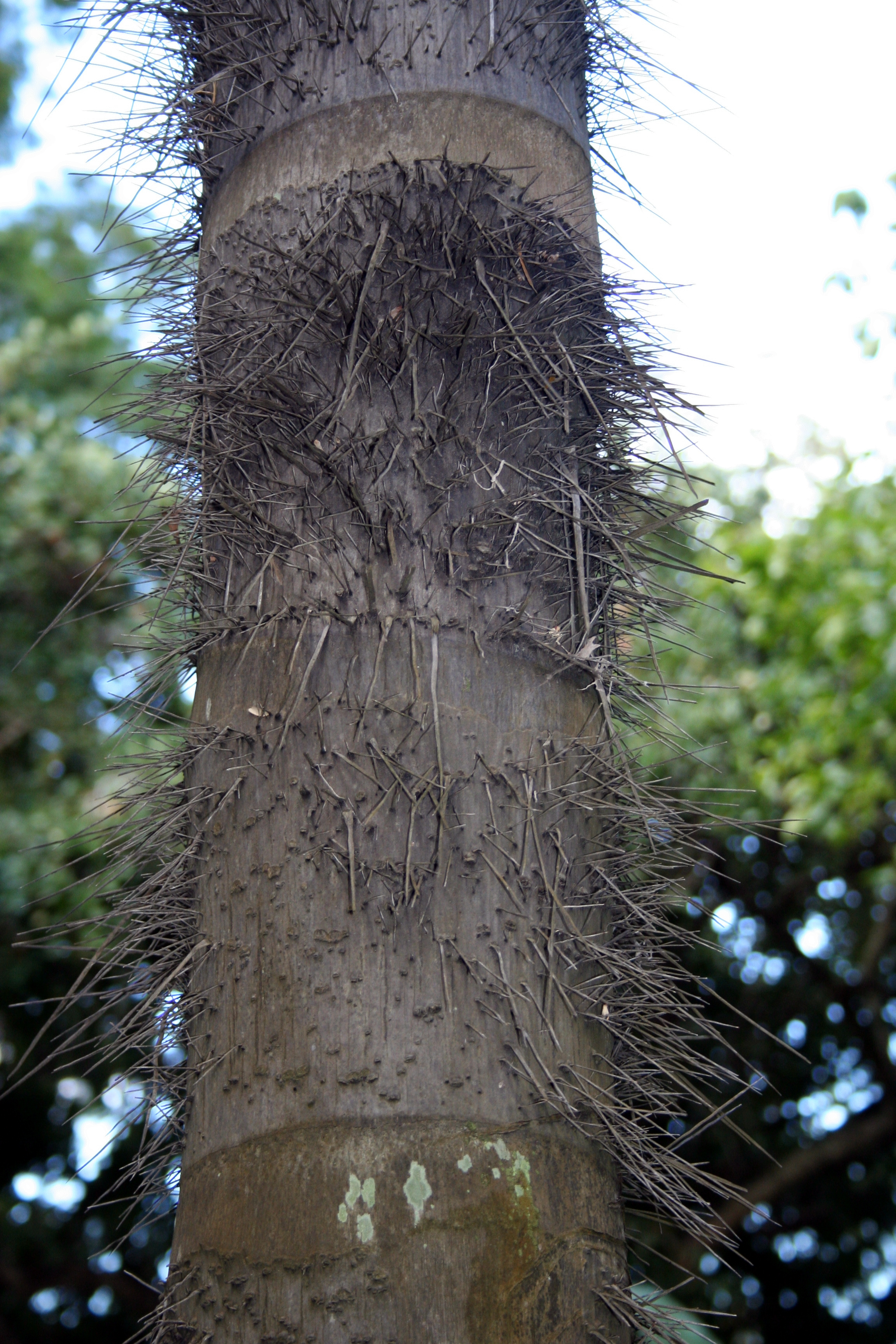
At Foster Botanical Garden, Hawaii

The fruit is attractive to many species of animals, such as agoutis, squirrels, spiny rats, capuchins, opossums, pacas, coatis, peccaries, and tapeti rabbits. Some animals can navigate the spines or reach the fruit by jumping from other trees, as the capuchin does, but most take the fallen fruits on the ground. It has been suggested that the fruit was once dispersed in addition to current living species by now-extinct large animals, such as gomphotheres. Animals disperse the seeds. The Central American agouti (Dasyprocta punctata) plays an important role in the life cycle of the plant. It is one of the most important food sources for this species of agouti. It collects the fruits and caches the seeds, burying them in the soil. It is constantly interested in its caches and often digs up the seeds to rebury them elsewhere. One agouti will commonly rob the cache of another, transporting the seeds to new locations. Researchers tracking cached seeds saw one seed moved 36 times before being eaten. The behavior is known as scatter-hoarding. This helps distribute the palm throughout the forest. As the fruiting season of the plant is about four months per year, the agouti makes up a large part of its diet with cached seeds the rest of the year. The Central American spiny rat (Proechimys semispinosus) is known to scatter-hoard the seeds, as well.

Other animals, such as ants, are not helpful, as they destroy the seeds while consuming the fruit. Most fruits are infested by bruchid beetles, but scolytid beetles are more effective seed predators on the plant.

This plant's common habitat type is wet forest up to 500 meters in elevation.

== Human uses ==
The fruit is edible for humans, as are the palm hearts. Other human uses for the plant include wood for walking sticks, bows, and fishing rods. The fruits are fed to pigs. It is occasionally processed for oil. It is a very important fiber plant for many local peoples. The Wounaa and Emberá peoples and native groups of African ancestry, such as Afro-Colombians and Afro-Ecuadorians, are familiar with the plant. The fibers come from the leaves. They are used to make furniture, pitchers, plates, trays, coasters, vases, bags, hats, jewelry and accessories, hammocks, and fishing nets. Fibers from the opened leaves are used to make mats, while less robust fibers from the immature leaves are used for basketry.

Much of the time, the fiber is harvested by cutting the fronds from the trees. Sometimes, though, the trees are cut down, a more destructive practice. This species is widespread in its range, but in localized areas where it is in demand for fiber, it has been "decimated". Its conservation status in most areas is unknown. In parts of Ecuador it is maintained with tropical agroforestry practices. Some local people grow plots of the palm on their land next to their crops.

The harvest of the usable parts is often done with a machete, the harvester taking care to avoid the spines. Instead of cutting down a tree, a harvester may use a media luna, a long pole with a curved blade at the end, to remove leaves. A bamboo pole with a chisel at the end may also be used. The Emberá prefer to harvest the plant during the full moon, when they believe the fibers are strongest. The leaf is split and two types of fibers can be extracted, a thick one useful for making the frames of baskets, and a thinner one used for weaving. The fibers are washed and sun-dried, then sometimes dyed with extracts of other plants, bleached with sulphur, or buried in mud to darken them. In basketry the fibers may be woven together with fibers from the Nahuala palm (Carludovica palmata), a palm-like monocot.

Except in Ecuador, few of the products are used at home. Most are sold locally or at nearby bazaars or shipped internationally. There is a massive world market for handcrafted plant-fiber products, with Japan and the United States major importers. This is considered to be one of the most economically important palms in Ecuador.
