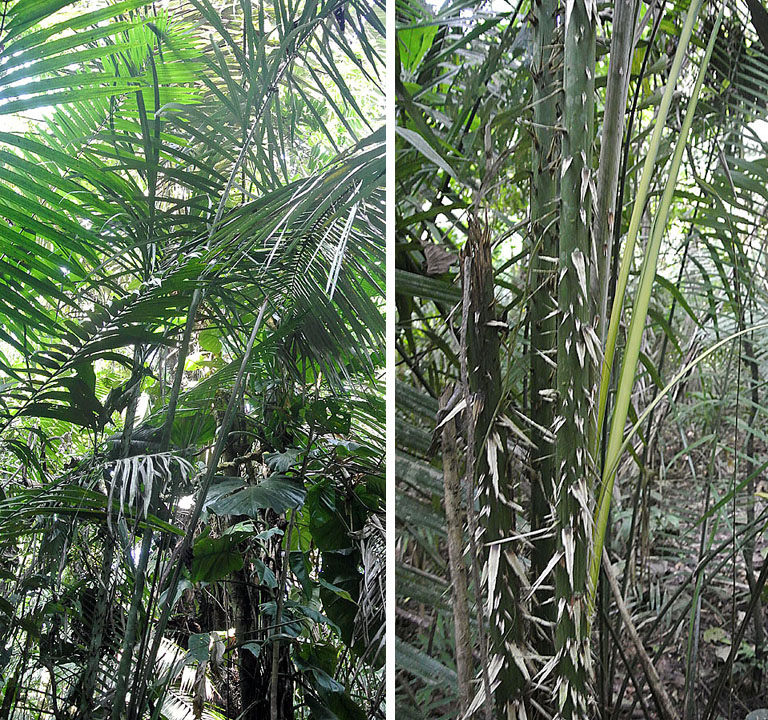

Scientific classification
- Kingdom: Plantae
- Clade: Tracheophytes
- Clade: Angiosperms
- Clade: Monocots
- Clade: Commelinids
- Order: Arecales
- Family: Arecaceae
- Genus: Astrocaryum
- Species: A. chambira

Binomial name
- Astrocaryum chambira Burret

= Astrocaryum chambira =

Species of palm

Astrocaryum chambira, the chambira palm or chambira, is a large and spiny palm native to the Amazon rainforest in Colombia, Ecuador, Peru, and Venezuela that is mostly known for its commercial value as a fiber crop. It can reach over 25 meters in height, and it is not uncommon for climbing trees to be planted nearby to make harvesting the fruit and leaves both easier and safer.

Indigenous people use the fibers of young leaves to weave into products such as nets, hammocks, bags, and other fabric and textile products. In most places where this fiber is used, the sale of products woven from these fibers to tourists is a major source of income, though there is great geographic variation in abundance and income received for products made from these fibers. In addition to the fibers, it is believed that the fruit and liquid endosperm within the seeds can help with fever reduction.
