= Georg Friedrich Wilhelm Meyer =

German botanist (1782–1856)

Georg Friedrich Wilhelm Meyer (1782-1856) was a German botanist who worked at the University of Göttingen.

== Biography ==
Born on 18 April 1782 in Hannover, Meyer studied natural sciences and forestry in Göttingen from 1802 to 1803, and from 1805 on in Dillingen. In 1806 he became a civil servant occupied with mountains and forests for Hannover, and from 1808 on he was a forest inspector in Paderborn. In 1813 he was appointed Regierungsrat for Prussia and director of forestrly for Paderborn, Corvey and Höxter. He went back to study in Göttingen in 1814, and was promoted in 1818. In 1820 he became the physical geographer for the Kingdom of Hanover, and in 1832 court councilor and professor of forestrly in Göttingen. He died on 19 March 1856 in Göttingen.

== Publications ==
- Chloris Hanoverana oder nach den natürlichen Familien geordnete Übersicht der im Königreiche Hannover wildwachsenden sichtbar blühenden Gewächse und Farn. Vandenhoeck und Ruprecht, Göttingen 1836 (Nebentitel: Flora des Königreichs Hannover).
- Beiträge zur chorographischen Kenntniss des Flussgebiets der Innerste in den Fürstenthümern Grubenhagen und Hildesheim. Erste Anlage zur Flora des Königreichs Hannover. Göttingen 1822 (Digitalisat).
- Über die Natur der Schachtelhalme. Flora des Königreichs Hannover, Angewandter Teil: Untersuchung der einzelnen Vegetabilien, Theil 1. Göttingen 1837 (Digitalisat).
- Flora Hanoverana Excursoria enthaltend die Beschreibung der Phanerogamischen Gewächse Norddeutschlands in den Flussgebieten der Ems, Weser und Unterelbe geordnet nach den natürlichen Familien. Vandenhoeck und Ruprecht, Göttingen 1849 (Digitalisat).
- Primitiae florae essequeboensis adjectis descriptionibus centum circiter stirpium novarum, observationibusque criticis. Dieterich, Göttingen 1818 (Digitalisat).

== Literature ==
- Klaus-Dirk Henke: Georg Friedrich Wilhelm Meyer. In: Karl Arndt et al.: Göttinger Gelehrte. Wallstein, 2001.
- Jan-Peter Frahm, Jens Eggers: Lexikon deutschsprachiger Bryologen. Bonn 2001, Band 1, p. 319 (with illustration).
