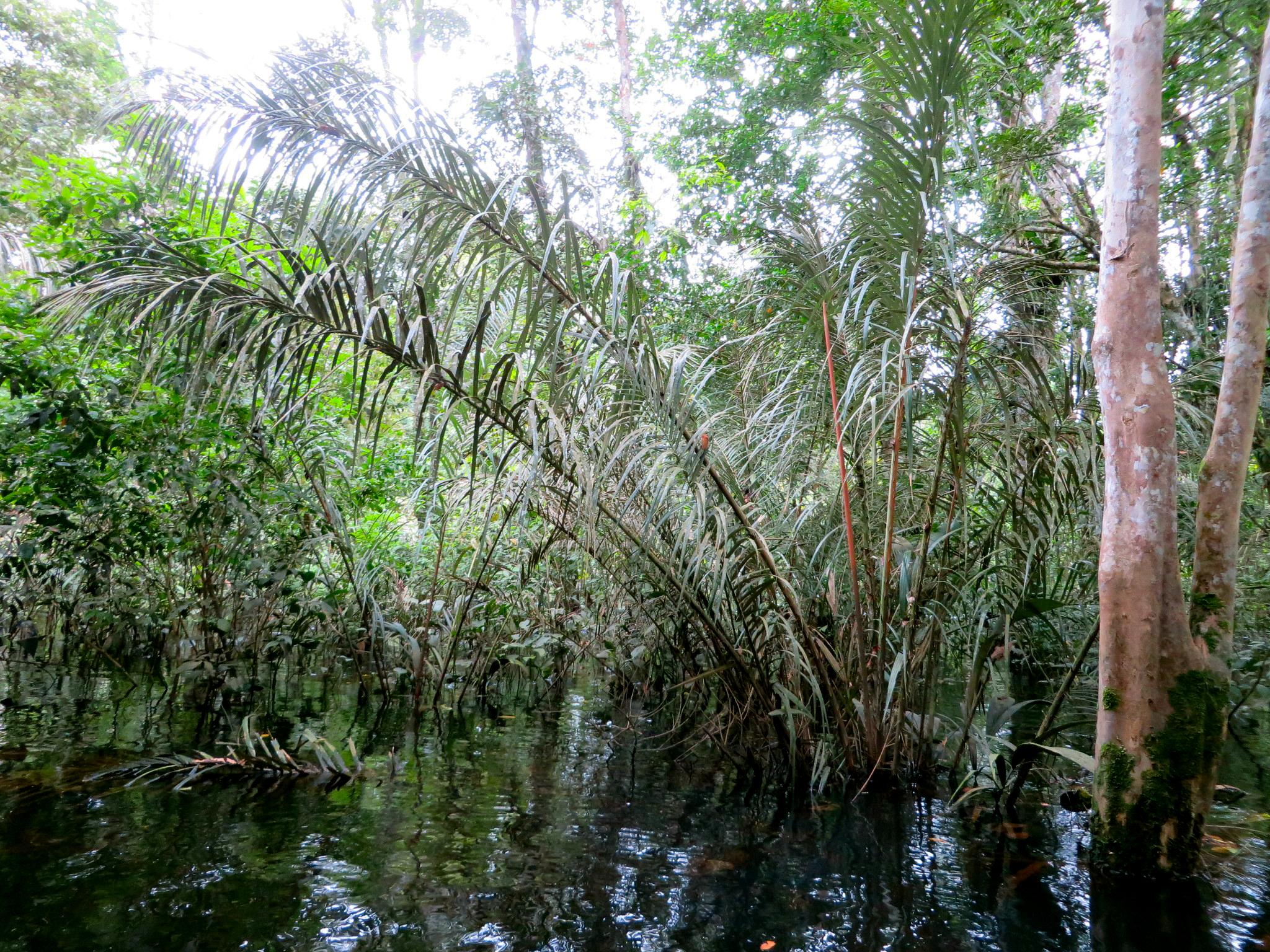
- Astrocaryum murumuru, Tipishca, eastern Ecuador

Scientific classification
- Kingdom: Plantae
- Clade: Tracheophytes
- Clade: Angiosperms
- Clade: Monocots
- Clade: Commelinids
- Order: Arecales
- Family: Arecaceae
- Genus: Astrocaryum
- Species: A. murumuru

Binomial name
- Astrocaryum murumuru Mart.

Synonyms
- Astrocaryum yauaperyense Barb.Rodr.

= Astrocaryum murumuru =

Species of palm

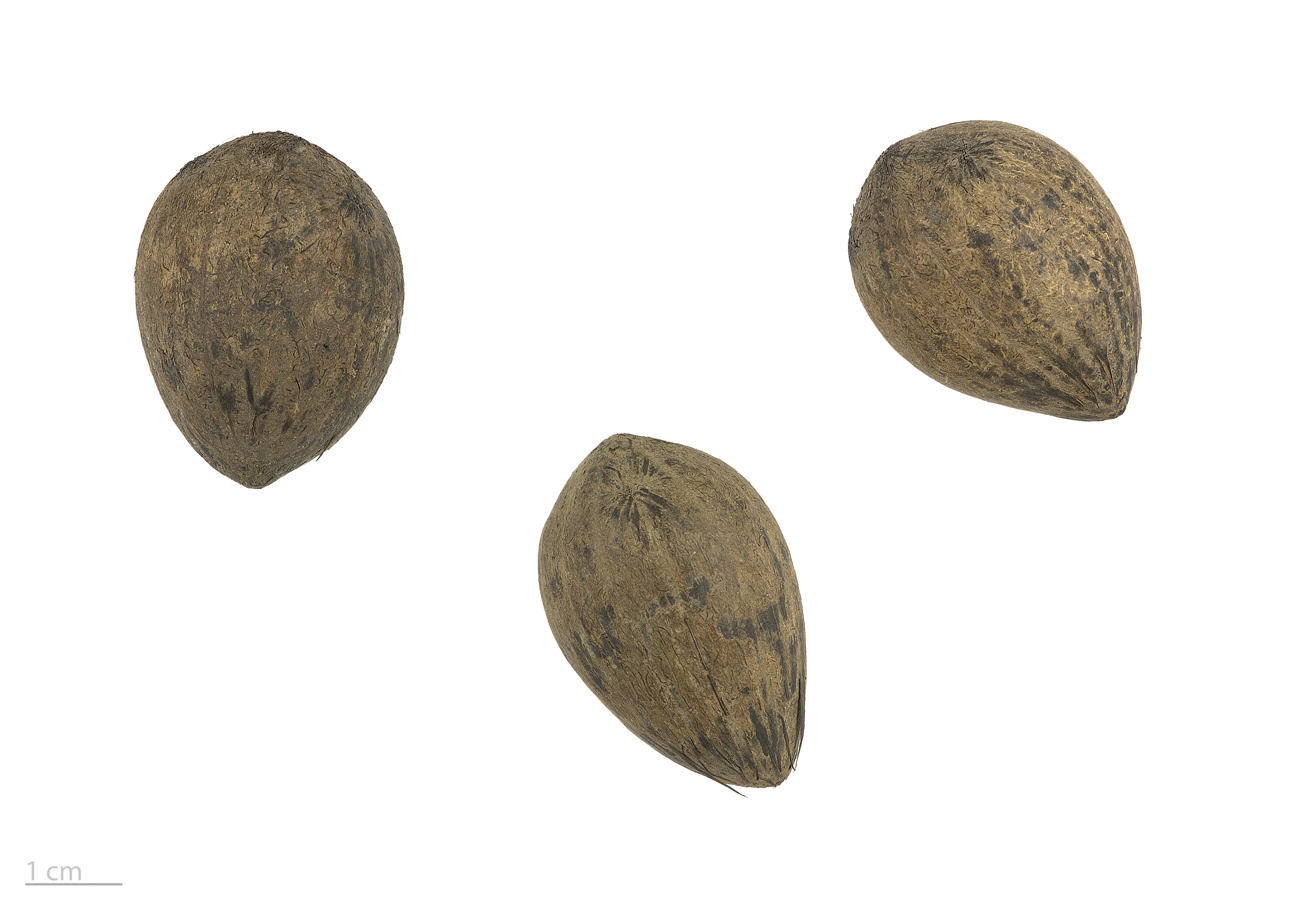
Astrocaryum murumuru - MHNT

Astrocaryum murumuru (Portuguese common name: murumuru) is a palm native to Amazon rainforest vegetation in Brazil, which bears edible fruits. Murumuru butter, extracted from the seeds of the plant, may be used as a moisturizer. One remarkable feature of this palm is that it is covered with spines up to 30 cm (12 in) long.

The murumuru palm tree grows in Brazil and around the Amazon and is one of the dominant trees in this region. It has a thick trunk and a shuttlecock-shaped, bushy crown. The nutritious, edible fruits are an important local food source and materials made from the tree, fruit, and seed kernels are commercially significant to the region. Hammocks are made from the tree's fibres. Murumuru butter is moisturizing (emollient). It is also film-forming and glossy. These qualities make it very protective. It contains vitamins and has a high content of oleic acid. The oil from the seeds is traditionally used to soften and protect hair. Murumuru butter is the white to yellowish fat obtained from the seeds of this palm.

== Ecology ==
It is abundant in the Brazilian Amazon, extending to the borders of Bolivia and Peru; it prefers to grow in periodically flooded areas, especially on islands and in lowlands along the rivers throughout the Amazon River estuary and its tributaries, in dense or semi-open forests. It is also frequently found in the lowlands of Marajo Island. The stem, leaves and fruit stalks are covered with hard, black spines that can reach over 20 cm in length, complicating fruit harvesting. When the fruit is ripe, the inflorescence (cluster of flowers) drops to the ground. The fruit contains a yellow flesh often consumed by rodents as food, which leave the seeds clean. The seed's hard shell is only separable from the kernel when dry. In general, 100 kg of dry seeds (12–15% water) yields 27 kg to 29 kg of kernels, which must be further dried to prevent deterioration during storage. These kernels then yield 40% to 42% oil. A single Murumuru palm produces about 11 kg of dry seeds. Hydraulic extraction can produce 35% oil relative to the dry weight of the kernel, which is equivalent to about 3.8 liters of oil per Murumuru palm. The kernels must be ground with grinding discs before hydraulic extraction. A kilogram of fruit pulp contains approximately 50 seeds. Seed germination is moderate and growth in the field is slow.

== Astrocaryum murumuru butter ==
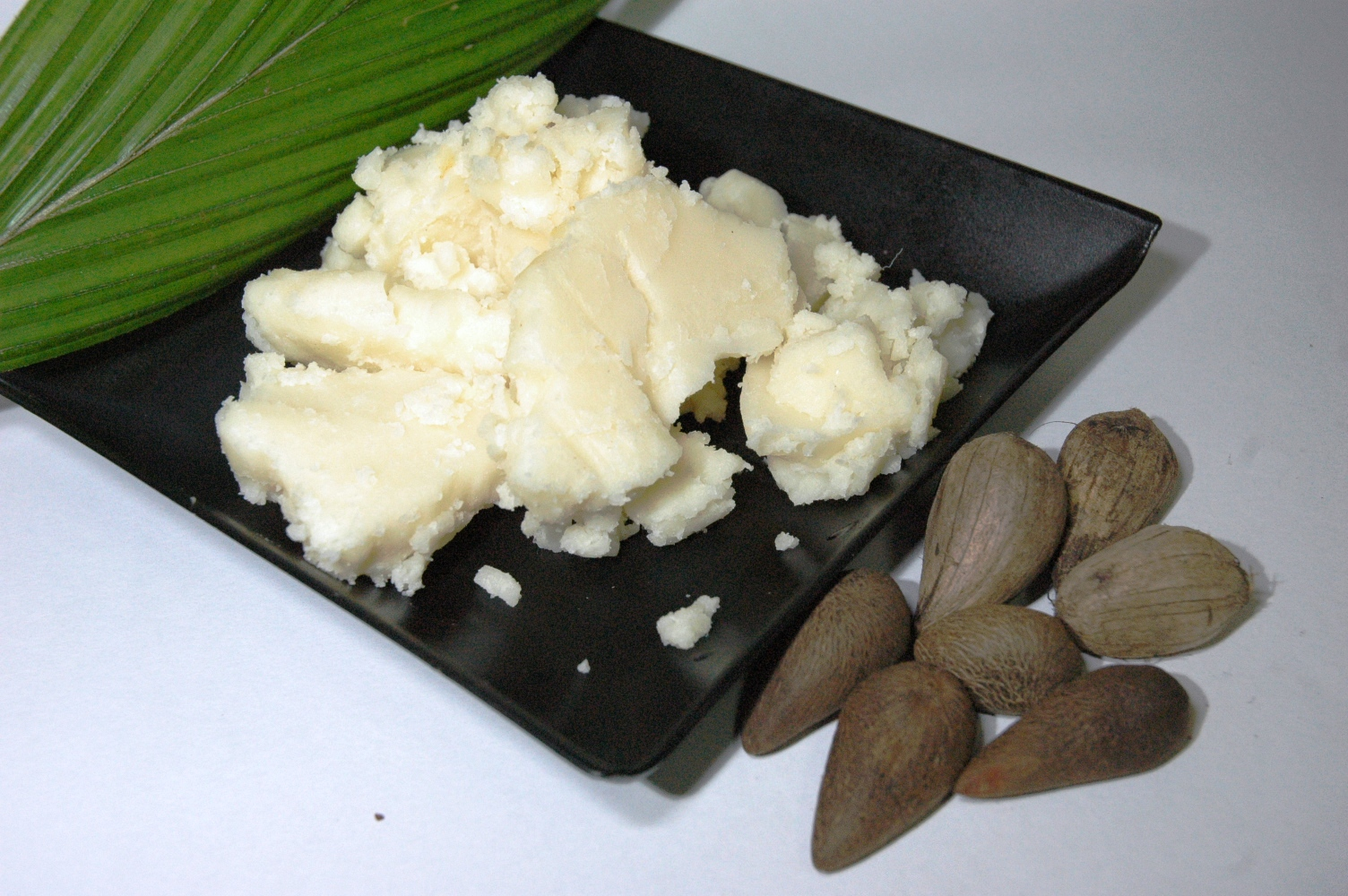
Murumuru butter

Murumuru butter contains lauric, myristic, and oleic acids. The fruit contains a white butter that is odorless and tasteless and has the advantage of not becoming rancid easily. The quality of Murumuru butter is similar to the seed fat of the Tucumã palm and coconut palm, but it has the advantage of providing greater consistency because of its melting point (33 °C), which is superior to that of the Tucumã palm (30 °C) and coconut palm (22.7 °C). The quality of Murumuru butter makes it possible to mix it with other vegetable butters that have a lower melting point. It can also be used to partially substitute cocoa butter in chocolate, providing a firmer consistency in environments where the temperature is higher. Murumuru butter has the great advantage of having a low acidity value (4% to 5%), especially when made from fresh seeds, which reduces the cost of refinement. Murumuru butter was highly valued in Europe and the United States during the 1940s and 1950s, when it served as an ingredient in vegetable creams and soaps. Today, soaps containing Murumuru butter together with Ucuuba butter leave a protection layer on the skin similar to silicone, only it does not clog the pores.

Murumuru butter is used in small amounts in shampoos (0.5% to 1%) and formulas for conditioners, creams, soaps, lipsticks and deodorants (0.5% to 8%).
