= List of Aiphanes species =

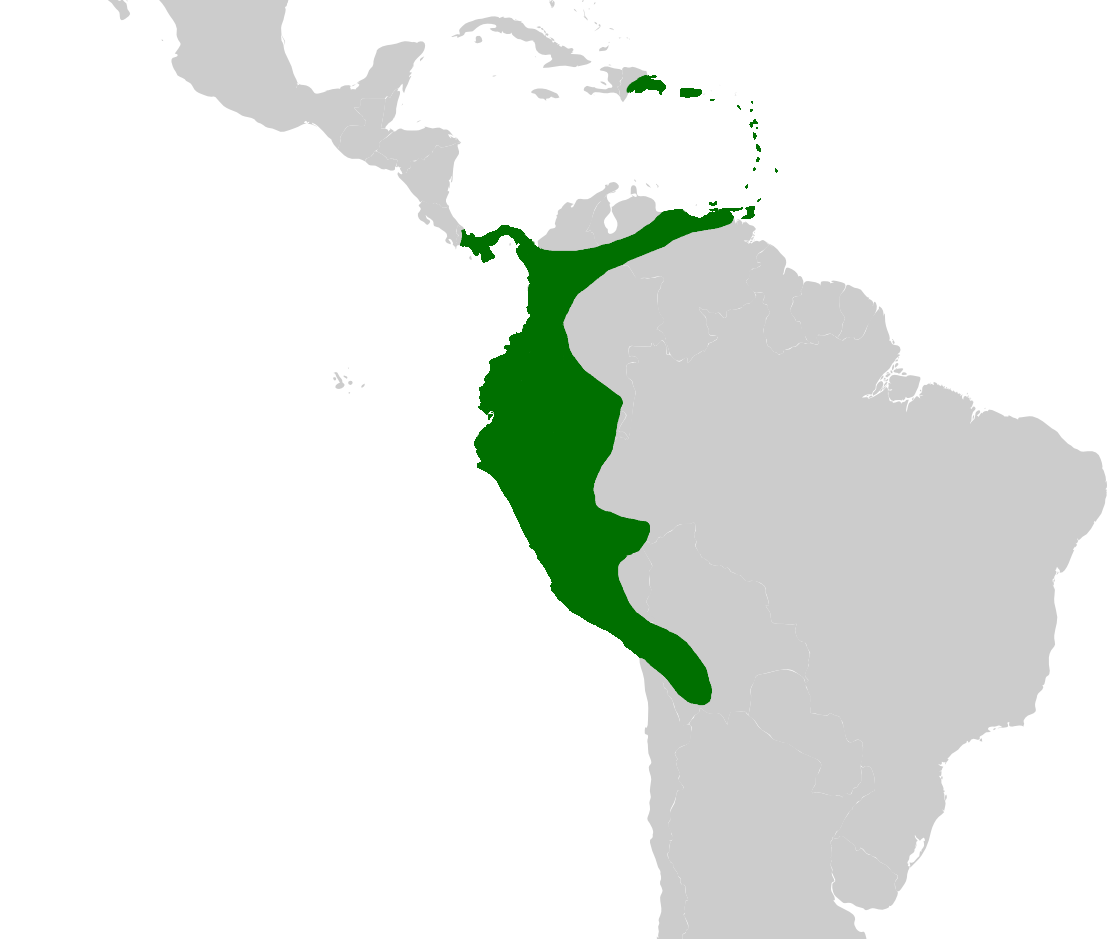
Native distribution of Aiphanes

This is a list of Aiphanes species. Aiphanes is a genus of spiny palms which is native to tropical regions of South America, Central America, and the Caribbean.

== Species ==
Names in green are currently accepted species, while those in red are not.

Species	Taxonomic status	Range	Conservation status
Aiphanes acanthophylla (Mart.) Burret	taxonomic synonym of A. minima		
Aiphanes acaulis Galeano & R.Bernal	accepted name	Western Colombia	
Aiphanes aculeata Willd.	syn. of A. horrida		
Aiphanes bicornis Cerón & R.Bernal	accepted name	Ecuador	
Aiphanes caryotifolia (Kunth) H.Wendl.	syn. of A. horrida		
Aiphanes chiribogensis Borchs. & Balslev	accepted name	Ecuador	
Aiphanes chocoensis A.H.Gentry	syn. of A. macroloba		
Aiphanes concinna H.E.Moore	syn. of A. lindeniana		
Aiphanes corallina (Mart.) H.Wendl.	syn. of A. minima		
Aiphanes deltoidea Burret	accepted name		
Aiphanes disticha (Linden) Burret	syn. of Martinezia disticha, a nomen nudum (Note: Linden applied the name to a juvenile plant, but produced no description or diagnostic characters.)		
Aiphanes duquei Burret	accepted name		
Aiphanes echinocarpa Dugand	syn. of A. linearis		
Aiphanes eggersii Burret	accepted name		
Aiphanes elegans (Linden & H.Wendl.) H.Wendl.	syn. of A. horrida		
Aiphanes erinacea (H.Karst.) H.Wendl.	accepted name		
Aiphanes ernestii (Burret) Burret	syn. of A. horrida		
Aiphanes erosa (Mart.) Burret	syn. of A. minima		
Aiphanes fosteriorum H.E.Moore	syn. of A. hirsuta subsp. fosteriorum		
Aiphanes fuscopubens L.H.Bailey	syn. of A. hirsuta subsp. hirsuta		
Aiphanes gelatinosa H.E.Moore	accepted name		
Aiphanes gracilis Burret	syn. of A. weberbaueri		
Aiphanes graminifolia Galeano & R.Bernal	accepted name		
Aiphanes grandis Borchs. & Balslev	accepted name		
Aiphanes hirsuta Burret	accepted name		
Aiphanes horrida (Jacq.) Burret	accepted name	Trinidad, Venezuela, Colombia, Peru, Brazil, Bolivia; cultivated throughout the tropics	
Aiphanes kalbreyeri Burret	syn. of A. hirsuta subsp. kalbreyeri		
Aiphanes killipii Burret	syn. of A. horrida		
Aiphanes leiospatha Burret	unplaced name (Note: The name A. leiospatha was based on an inflorescence of an unknown species, probably A. hirsuta subsp. hirsuta, together with the leaf of a different species.)		
Aiphanes leiostachys Burret	accepted name		
Aiphanes lindeniana (H.Wendl.) H.Wendl.	accepted name		
Aiphanes linearis Burret	accepted name		
Aiphanes luciana L.H.Bailey	syn. of A. minima		
Aiphanes macroloba Burret	accepted name		
Aiphanes minima (Gaertn.) Burret	accepted name		
Aiphanes monostachys Burret	syn. of A. macroloba		
Aiphanes orinocensis Burret	syn. of A. horrida		
Aiphanes pachyclada Burret	syn. of A. minima		
Aiphanes parvifolia Burret	accepted name		
Aiphanes pilaris R.Bernal	accepted name		
Aiphanes praemorsa (Poepp. ex Mart.) Burret	syn. of A. horrida		
Aiphanes praga Humboldt, Bonpland & Kunth	syn. of Prestoea acuminata var. acuminata.		
Aiphanes schultzeana Burret	syn. of A. ulei		
Aiphanes simplex Burret	accepted name		
Aiphanes spicata Brochs. & R.Bernal	accepted name		
Aiphanes stergiosii S.M.Niño, Dorr & F.W.Stauffer	accepted name		
Aiphanes tessmannii Burret	syn. of A. weberbaueri		
Aiphanes tricuspidata Borchs., M.Ruíz & Bernal	accepted name		
Aiphanes truncata (Brongn. ex Mart.) H.Wendl.	syn. of A. horrida		
Aiphanes ulei (Dammer) Burret	accepted name		
Aiphanes verrucosa Borchs. & Balslev	accepted name		
Aiphanes vincentiana L.H.Bailey	syn. of A. minima		
Aiphanes weberbaueri Burret	accepted name		
