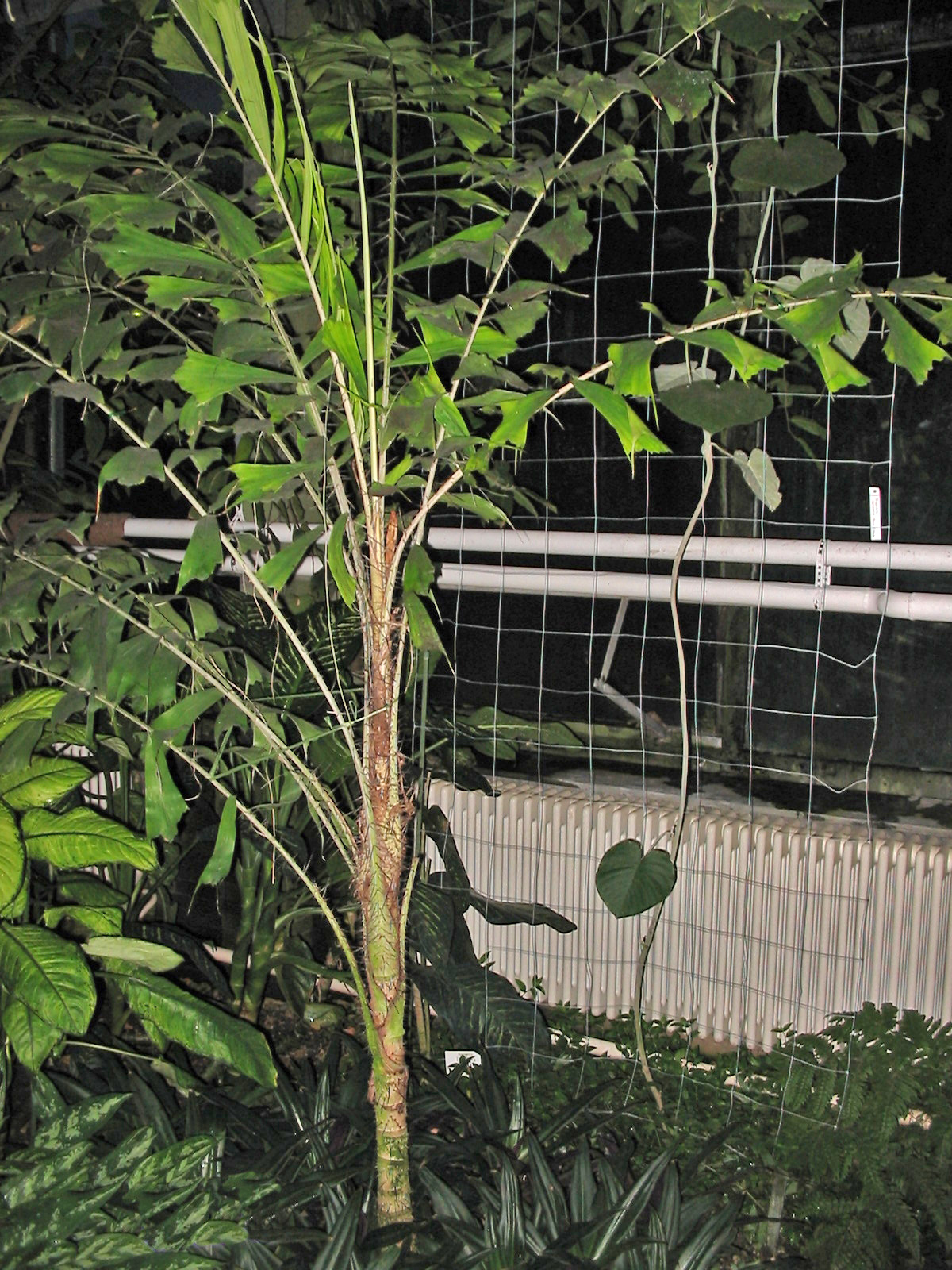
- Aiphanes horrida at Jena botanical garden

Scientific classification
- Kingdom: Plantae
- Clade: Embryophytes
- Clade: Tracheophytes
- Clade: Spermatophytes
- Clade: Angiosperms
- Clade: Monocots
- Clade: Commelinids
- Order: Arecales
- Family: Arecaceae
- Subfamily: Arecoideae
- Tribe: Cocoseae
- Genus: Aiphanes; Willd.

Type species
- Aiphanes horrida (Jacq.) Burret

Diversity
- About 26 species
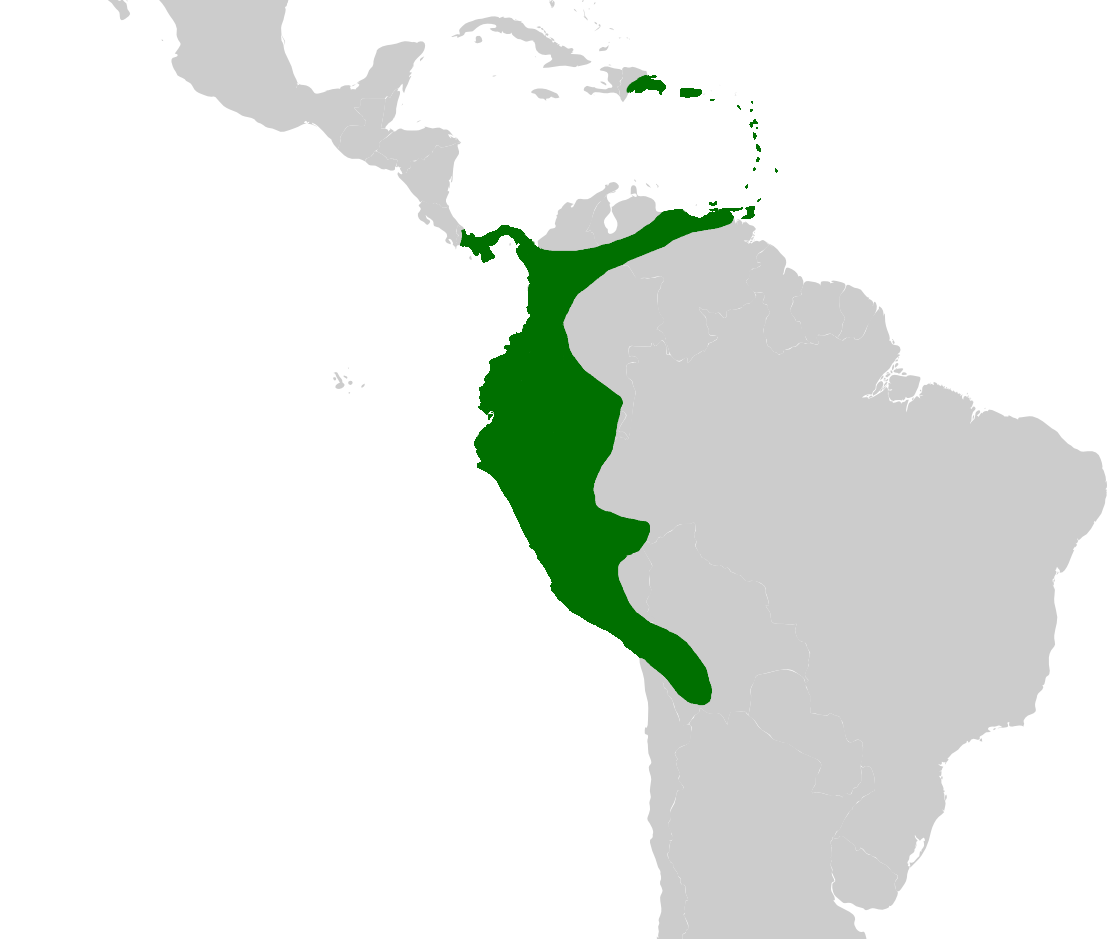
- Native distribution of Aiphanes

Synonyms
- Martinezia (sensu Kunth, not Ruiz y Pavón); Marara H.Karst. Curima O.F.Cook; Tilmia O.F.Cook

= Aiphanes =

Genus of flowering plants

Aiphanes is a genus of spiny palms which is native to tropical regions of South and Central America and the Caribbean. There are about 26 species in the genus (see below), ranging in size from understorey shrubs with subterranean stems to subcanopy trees as tall as 20 metres (66 ft). Most have pinnately compound leaves (leaves which are divided into leaflets arranged feather-like, in pairs along a central axis); one species has entire leaves. Stems, leaves and sometimes even the fruit are covered with spines. Plants flower repeatedly over the course of their lifespan and have separate male and female flowers, although these are borne together on the same inflorescence. Although records of pollinators are limited, most species appear to be pollinated by insects. The fruit are eaten by several birds and mammals, including at least two species of amazon parrots.

Carl Ludwig Willdenow coined the name Aiphanes in 1801. Before that, species belonging to the genus had been placed in Bactris or Caryota. The name Martinezia had also been applied to the genus, and between 1847 and 1932 it was generally used in place of Aiphanes. Max Burret resurrected the name Aiphanes in 1932 and laid the basis for the modern concept of the genus. Aiphanes is most closely related to several other genera of spiny palms—Acrocomia, Astrocaryum, Bactris and Desmoncus. Two species are widely planted as ornamentals and the fruit, seeds or palm heart of several species have been eaten by indigenous peoples of the Americas for millennia.

== Description ==
Aiphanes is a genus of spiny palms ranging from 20-metre (66 ft) tall subcanopy trees to small shrubs with subterranean stems growing in the forest understorey. Its name combines the Ancient Greek ai, meaning "always", with phaneros, meaning "evident", "visible" or "conspicuous". In their 1996 monograph on the genus, botanists Finn Borchsenius and Rodrigo Bernal pointed out that "ironically, species of Aiphanes are generally very hard to spot and find in dense vegetation and, accordingly, are among the most poorly collected neotropical palms".

=== Stems ===
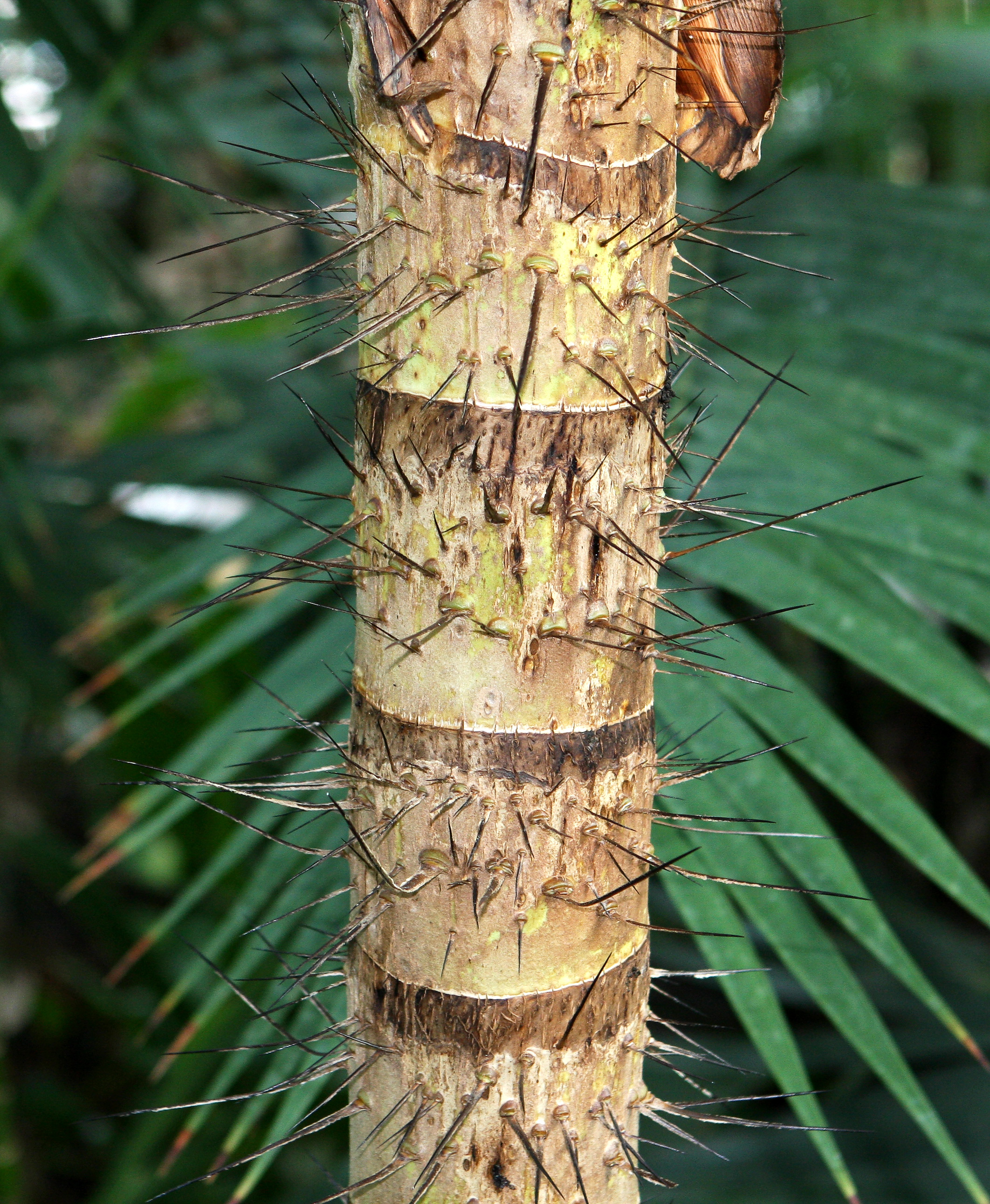
Stem of Aiphanes minima showing spines and leaf scars

While some species are single-stemmed, others form multi-stemmed (caespitose) clumps. Coupled with variation in stem size, this produces a diversity of growth forms in the genus—solitary (single-stemmed) palms that grow into the subcanopy of the forest, solitary or caespitose palms that grow in the forest understorey and acaulescent palms which lack an aboveground stem.

Two species are characterised by an acaulescent growth habit—A. acaulis and A. spicata. Two other species—A. ulei and A. weberbaueri—occur in both acaulescent populations and those which produce above-ground stems. Several species are single-stemmed understorey palms, an unusual growth form. Aiphanes grandis and A. minima are single-stemmed palms which grow to be more than 10 metres (33 ft) tall, while the remainder are multi-stemmed understorey species. Multi-stemmed palms range from plants with a single main stem and a few basal suckers to caespitose clumps of 20 densely packed stems. A variety of growth forms can exist within a single species and this appears to be influenced by habitat and environmental conditions.

=== Leaves ===
The leaves of Aiphanes species are usually pinnately divided—rows of leaflets emerge on either side of the axis of the leaf in a feather-like or fern-like pattern. The sole exception to this is A. macroloba which has entire leaves. They are usually spirally arranged, but some species have a distichous leaf arrangement, a condition that is normal in palm seedlings but uncommon among adults. Old leaf bases detach cleanly from the stem, except in A. hirsuta subsp. fosteriorum, which often has old leaf bases attached to the newer portions of the stem.

Leaves are spiny but the degree varies both within and among species. Leaf sheaths are always densely spiny, but the spines usually become smaller and sparser towards the ends of the leaves.

=== Spines ===
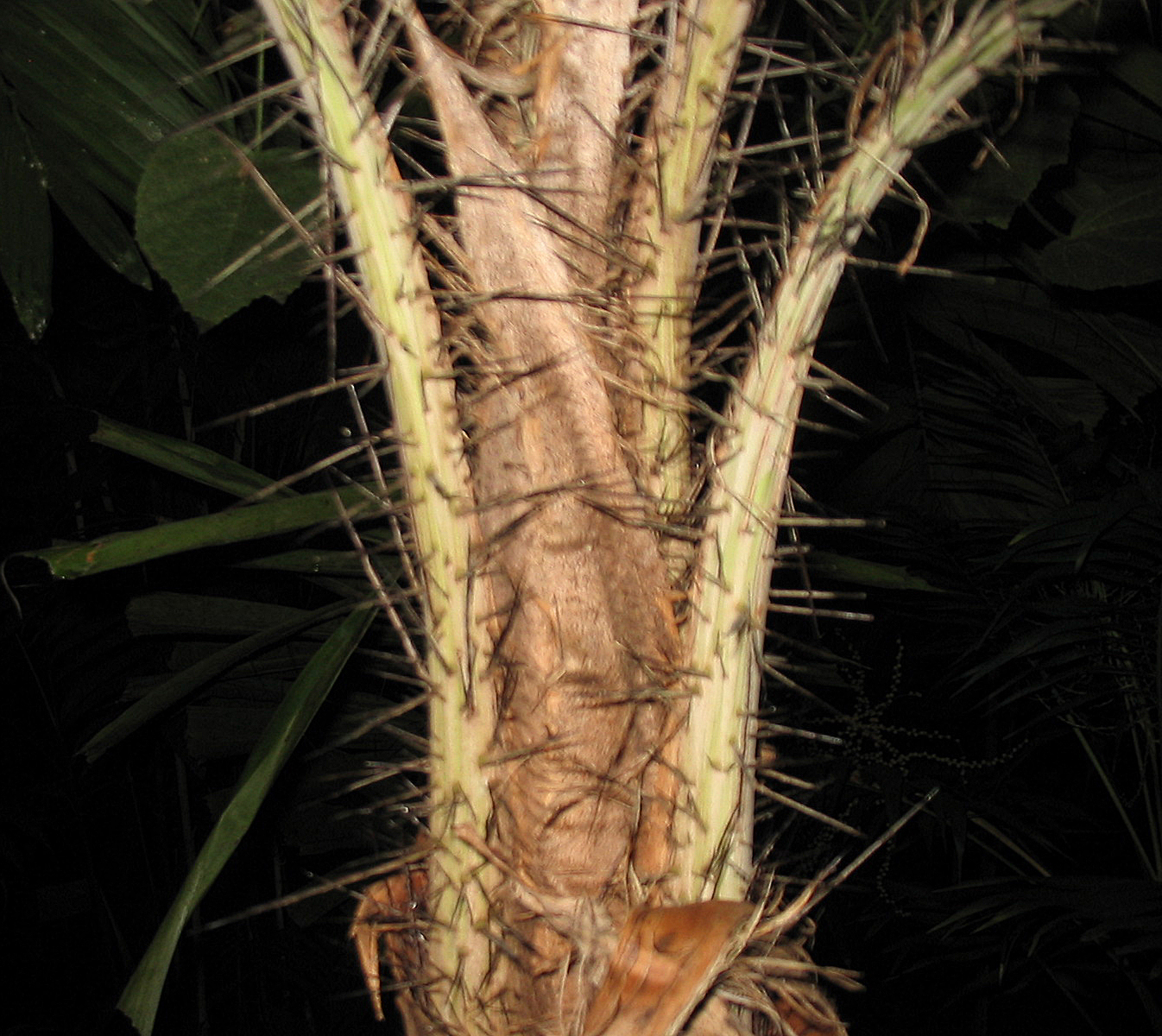
Details of the stem, petioles and leaf bases of Aiphanes horrida showing its spiny nature

Spines are characteristic of Aiphanes and other members of the subtribe Bactridinae. They are found almost everywhere on the plants and are especially well-developed on the stem, leaf bases, and the peduncle. In Aiphanes, the spines are formed from the outer tissues of the plant and are not derived through the modification of other plant organs. They range from less than 1 millimetre (0.04 in) to more than 25 centimetres (9.8 in) long.

=== Flowers ===
Aiphanes species are pleonanthic—they flower repeatedly over the course of their lifespan—and monoecious, meaning that there are separate male and female flowers, but individuals plants bear both types of flowers. In Aiphanes, male and female flowers are borne together on the same inflorescence. Usually only a single inflorescence is borne at each node, although A. gelatinosa often bears then in groups of three at a single node. The inflorescence usually consists of a main axis consisting of a peduncle and a rachis. The rachis bears rachillae, which are smaller branches which themselves bear the flowers, while the peduncle is the main stalk connecting the rachis with the stem of the plant. In some species there is second-order branching—the rachillae themselves are branched and the flowers are borne on these branches.

Flowers are usually borne in groups of three—one female flower together with two male flowers. In some species groups of four flowers (two male and two female) have been reported. At the far end of the inflorescence, away from the axis of the tree, pairs of male flowers replace the triads of male and female flowers. Flower colour is poorly known. It must be recorded from live plants, since preserved flowers lose their colour over time, and records of these species in the wild are incomplete. Male flowers tend to fall into two groups—those with cream or yellow flowers and those with some amount of purple in the flowers. Female flowers are even less well known than male flowers.

Pollen grains are usually spherical to ellipsoid in shape, sometimes triangular, about 20 to 30 micrometres along their long axis and 20 to 30 μm in diameter. They are typically monosulcate, meridionosulcate or more rarely trichotomosulcate. The sulcus is a furrow which runs along the surface of the pollen grain and is usually the site at which pollination occurs. Monosulcate pollen has a single furrow that runs along the pole of the pollen grain. Meridionosulcate pollen have a furrow that runs along the equator of the pollen grain. Trichotomosulcate pollen, on the other hand, has three furrows. The outer layer of the pollen is covered to a greater or lesser extent with ridges, spines or warts. This "sculpting" tends to be more pronounced in species that are fly-pollinated and less pronounced in those that are pollinated by beetles or bees.

=== Fruit ===
The fruit of Aiphanes species is usually a red, spherical, single-seeded drupe. A thin skin (or epicarp), which can be either smooth or spiny, covers the fleshy mesocarp, which is typically orange and sweet. The mesocarp of A. horrida has one of the highest reported carotene contents of any plant product and is also rich in protein. The endocarp, which encases the seed, is brown or black and very hard at maturity. Seeds are light brown with a thin seed coat (or testa) and white endosperm, which is sweet and tastes somewhat like coconut.

=== Karyotype ===
Published chromosome counts exist for two species, Aiphanes minima and A. horrida; haploid chromosome counts vary from 15 to 18. Borchsenius and Bernal report that it is difficult to get accurate chromosome counts in palms and that differences in chromosome counts may reflect these difficulties.

== Taxonomy ==
- - Desmoncus orthacanthos
  - - Bactris gasipaes
    - - Aiphanes aculeata*
      - - Acrocomia crispa
        - Acrocomia aculeata

Relationship between members of the subtribe Bactridinae, based on plastid DNA phylogeny. *Aiphanes aculeata is a botanical synonym of A. horrida.

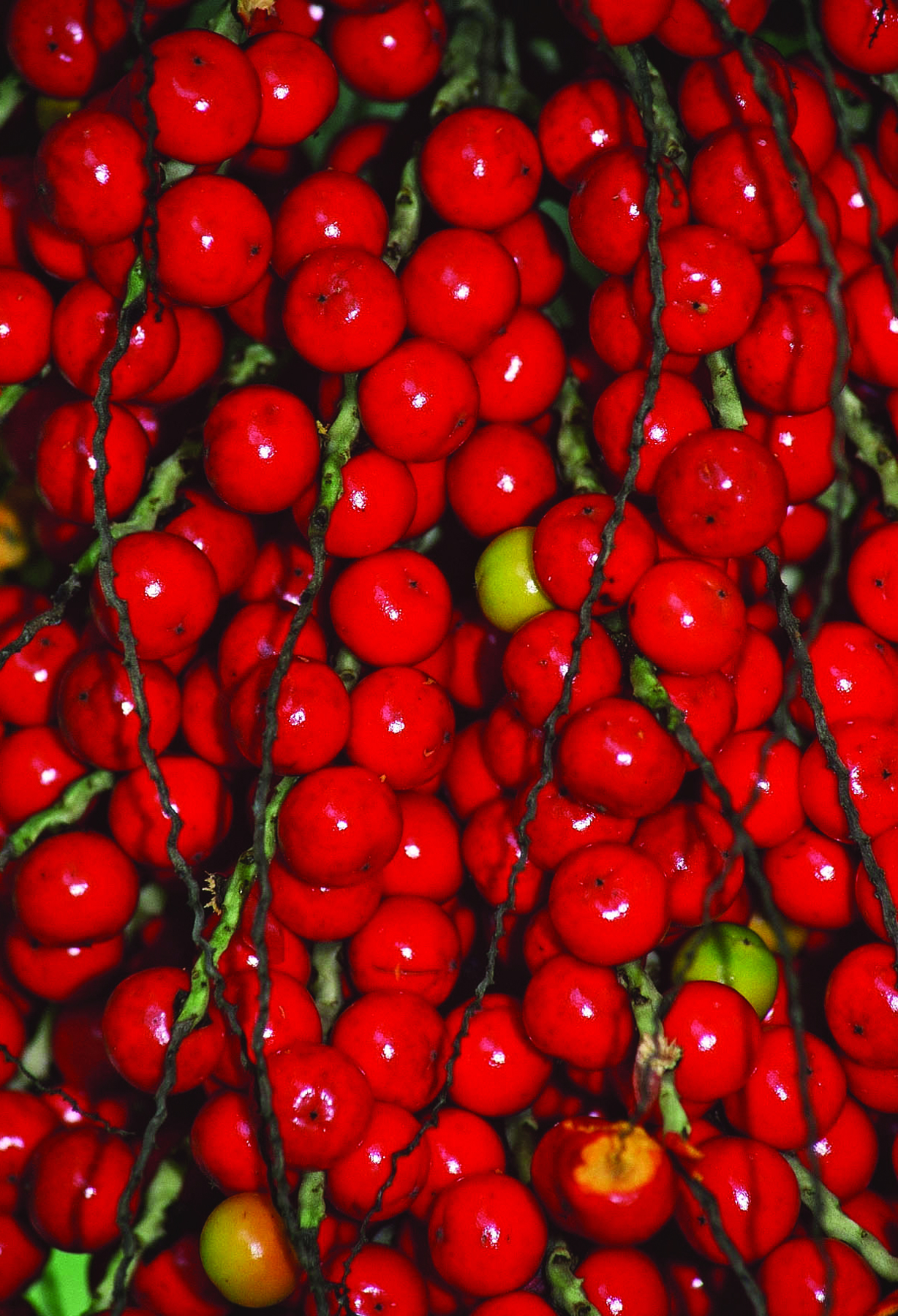
Red, spherical fruit of Aiphanes minima

Aiphanes is placed in the subfamily Arecoideae, the tribe Cocoseae and the subtribe Bactridinae, together with the genera Desmoncus, Bactris, Acrocomia and Astrocaryum.

In his 1932 revision of the genus, German botanist Max Burret recognised 32 species. Seventeen of these were new species, mostly based on collections made by German botanist Wilhelm Kalbreyer in northern Colombia between 1877 and 1881. Working with a very narrow species concept, and not being familiar with the variation present in natural populations, Burret placed almost every specimen into a distinct species. The bombing of the Berlin Herbarium during the Second World War destroyed the only known collections for 13 of these 32 species, further complicating the situation.

The International Code of Botanical Nomenclature requires each species to be represented by a type collection. The destruction of Burret's type collections left many species only known from his original descriptions, which generally lacked illustrations. Other specimens (called neotypes) were designated to replace these, either by Rodrigo Bernal and colleagues in 1989 or by Borchsenius and Bernal in their 1996 monograph of the genus. Bernal and colleagues attempted to retrace Kalbreyer's travels in northern Colombia and collect specimens from as close as possible to the location of the original collections.

Burret divided Aiphanes into two subgenera, Brachyanthera and Macroanthera. Eleven species were placed in Macroanthera, while the remainder were placed in Brachyanthera. In their 1996 monograph, Borchsenius and Bernal questioned the applicability of these subgenera. They recognised that if Macroanthera was reduced to three species (A. horrida, A. eggersii and A. minima) it could form a viable grouping, but that this would leave Brachyanthera overly heterogeneous. Consequently, they abandoned Burret's use of subgenera.

In the three decades following Burret's delimitation of the genus a further 15 species were described, bringing the total species count to 47. Borchsenius and Bernal determined that many of these names were synonyms, although American botanist George Proctor disagreed with their decision to lump A. acanthophylla into A. minima. Borchsenius and Bernal also described one new species, Aiphanes spicata, bringing the total number of accepted species to 22. In two cases the destruction of the only known collections made it impossible to be absolutely certain that a name was a synonym. The current World Checklist of Selected Plant Families, maintained by Rafaël Govaerts at the Royal Botanic Gardens, Kew, recognises 26 species, including four species described since the publication of Borchsenius and Bernal's monograph.

Burret divided Aiphanes into two subgenera, Brachyanthera and Macroanthera. Eleven species were placed in Macroanthera, with the remainder in Brachyanthera. In their 1996 monograph, Borchsenius and Bernal questioned the applicability of these subgenera. They recognised that if Macroanthera was reduced to three species (A. horrida, A. eggersii and A. minima) it could form a viable grouping, but that this would leave Brachyanthera overly heterogeneous. Consequently, they abandoned Burret's use of subgenera.

=== History ===
The earliest botanical description of a species in the genus was made by French botanist Charles Plumier, who described two species based on his visits to the West Indies between 1689 and 1695. Both of Plumier's species are now considered to be Aiphanes minima. The same species was described by Dutch botanist Nikolaus Joseph von Jacquin in 1763. Spanish botanist José Celestino Mutis produced a detailed description of A. lindeniana and illustrations of that species and what is thought to be A. horrida in 1779.

In 1791 Joseph Gaertner included a species of Aiphanes in his De Fructibus et Seminibus Plantarum, calling it Bactris minima. This is the oldest validly published name for any member of the genus. The name Aiphanes was coined by German botanist Carl Ludwig Willdenow in 1801. He described a single species, A. aculeata, in 1806.

Jacquin had used the name Caryota horrida to describe a plant that belonged to the same species (and may have been the same individual) described by Willdenow. Borchsenius and Bernal cite an 1809 publication date for Jacquin's description, which gave precedence to Willdenow's name. However, the more recent World Checklist (2006) gives an 1801 publication date for Jacquin's description, making A. horrida the correct name for the species.

In 1816 Alexander von Humboldt, Aimé Bonpland and Carl Sigismund Kunth described Martinezia caryotifolia, adding another name to the list of synonyms for A. horrida. Since the original diagnostic characters of Martinezia did not fit any existent species, it was redefined by Kunth to fit M. caryotifolia. Consequently, Martinezia came to replace Aiphanes and the latter name was rarely used between 1847 and 1932. In 1857 Hermann Karsten created a new genus, Marara, to accommodate two Colombian species, M. bicuspidata (later shown to be a synonym for A. horrida) and M. erinacea (now A. erinacea). Hermann Wendland attempted to resurrect Aiphanes in 1878, merging Martinezia and Marara into it, but his proposal was ignored. In 1901 Orator F. Cook created two new genera—Curima, into which he put A. minima, and Tilmia, which housed A. horrida. In 1932, after publishing a species in Martinezia, Burret changed his mind about the genus and synonymised it with Aiphanes. This led to the current delimitation of the genus.

=== Species ===
Species accepted by the World Checklist of Selected Plant Families:

- Aiphanes acanthophylla (Mart.) Burret – Puerto Rico, Dominican Republic
- Aiphanes acaulis Galeano & R.Bernal – Colombia
- Aiphanes argos R.Bernal, Borchs. & Hoyos-Gómez – Colombia
- Aiphanes bicornis Cerón & R.Bernal – Ecuador
- Aiphanes buenaventurae R.Bernal & Borchs. – Valle del Cauca in Colombia
- Aiphanes chiribogensis Borchs. & Balslev – Ecuador
- Aiphanes deltoidea Burret – Colombia, Peru, northwestern Brazil
- Aiphanes duquei Burret – Colombia
- Aiphanes eggersii Burret – Ecuador, Peru
- Aiphanes erinacea (H.Karst.) H.Wendl. – Colombia, Ecuador
- Aiphanes gelatinosa H.E.Moore – Colombia, Ecuador
- Aiphanes graminifolia Galeano & R.Bernal – Colombia
- Aiphanes grandis Borchs. & Balslev – Ecuador
- Aiphanes hirsuta Burret – Colombia, Ecuador, Panama, Costa Rica
- Aiphanes horrida (Jacq.) Burret – Trinidad, Colombia, Venezuela, Peru, northwestern Brazil, Bolivia
- Aiphanes leiostachys Burret – Antioquia in Colombia
- Aiphanes lindeniana (H.Wendl.) H.Wendl. – Colombia
- Aiphanes linearis Burret – Antioquia and Valle del Cauca in Colombia
- Aiphanes macroloba Burret – Colombia, Ecuador
- Aiphanes minima (Gaertn.) Burret – Saint Lucia, Barbados
- Aiphanes multiplex R.Bernal & Borchs. – Valle del Cauca in Colombia
- Aiphanes parvifolia Burret – Colombia
- Aiphanes pilaris R.Bernal – Colombia
- Aiphanes simplex Burret – Colombia
- Aiphanes spicata Borchs. & R.Bernal – Peru
- Aiphanes stergiosii S.M.Niño – State of Portuguesa in western Venezuela
- Aiphanes tricuspidata Borchs., M.Ruíz & Bernal – Colombia, Ecuador
- Aiphanes ulei (Dammer) Burret – Colombia, Ecuador, Peru, northwestern Brazil
- Aiphanes verrucosa Borchs. & Balslev – Ecuador
- Aiphanes weberbaueri Burret – Ecuador, Peru

== Distribution and status ==
The genus Aiphanes ranges from Hispaniola (the Dominican Republic) and Panama in the north, to Trinidad and Tobago in the east, across Colombia and down along the Andes to Bolivia. In Brazil it only occurs along the border with Peru. Aiphanes is primarily South American—one species (A. hirsuta) is present in Panama and two others (A. horrida and A. minima) are found in the Caribbean. Aiphanes minima, which is endemic to the insular Caribbean, is the only species absent from the South American mainland. Although A. horrida has been reported from Guyana and southern Venezuela these reports have not been verified with herbarium vouchers.

Aiphanes horrida is the most widely distributed species. It ranges from Trinidad to Bolivia but is absent from Ecuador and northern Peru. Other species have narrower ranges with one centre of diversity in western Colombia and Ecuador and another minor one in northeastern Peru. The 2006 IUCN Red List includes three species which are endangered by habitat destruction—A. grandis, A. leiostachys and A verrucosa—and three others considered vulnerable to the same threat—A. chiribogensis, A. duquei and A. lindeniana. Rodrigo Bernal and Gloria Galeano expanded this list in a 2005 review of the status of Colombian palms. They listed two species as critically endangered—A. graminifolia, a species that was first described in 2002, and A. leiostachys (which was classified as endangered in the IUCN Red List). They classified two species as endangered—A. acaulis and A. parvifolia—and two species as vulnerable—A. gelatinosa and A. pilaris. They also classified six species as near threatened—A. erinacea, A. hirsuta, A. lindeniana (vulnerable according to the IUCN Red List), A. linearis, A. macroloba and A. simplex. The threats to these species were not listed, but Jens-Christian Svenning reported that A. erinacea was threatened by logging given its limited distribution and poor ability to regenerate in disturbed forests. In addition to these, A. deltoidea, which is widely distributed across the western Amazon rainforest, is present at such low densities that it was classified as a rare species by Francis Kahn and Farana Moussa in 1994.

== Habitat and ecology ==
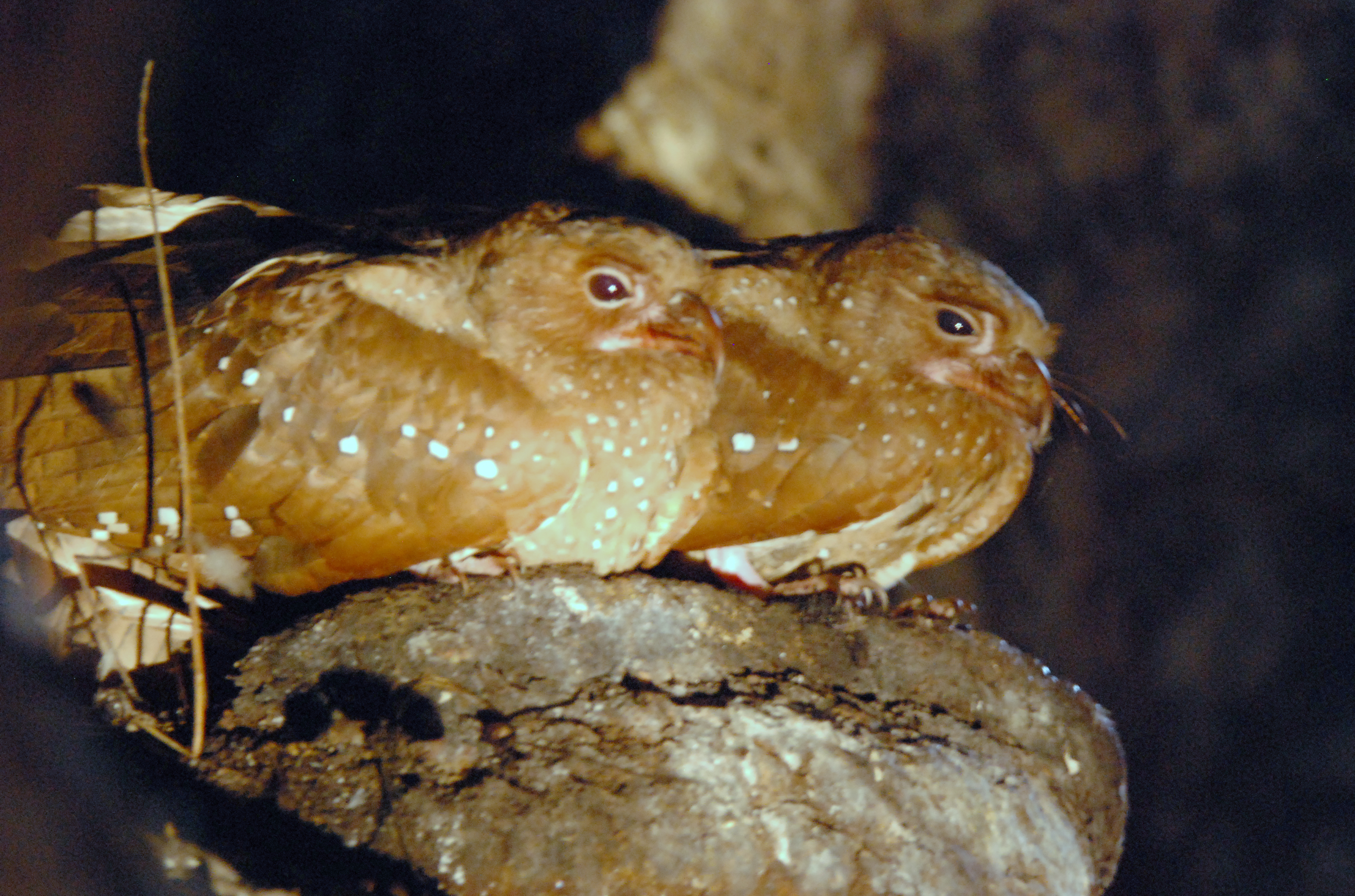
Oilbirds (Steatornis caripensis) consume the fruit and disperse the seeds of Aiphanes horrida.

Aiphanes species are palms of the forest understorey and subcanopy. The most widely distributed species, A. horrida, occurs both in tropical dry forest and in more humid forest types, but there is a gap in its distribution which coincides with the wettest forests of the upper Amazon Basin. Two other species, A. minima and A. eggersii, are also found in drier environments; A. eggersii is found in areas receiving as little as 500 mm (20 in) of precipitation annually. The remaining species are found in montane forests at high elevations or in wet—often very wet—lowland forests, including areas receiving as much as 9,000 mm (350 in) of annual precipitation.

Records of visits by pollinators exist for only a few species, but most of these suggest that the species are pollinated by insects. Flowers of A. chiribogensis produce small quantities of nectar, but lack a scent. Fruit flies (Drosophilidae), fungus gnats (Mycetophilidae, Sciaridae), midges (Cecidomyiidae, Ceratopogonidae) and micromoths (Lepidoptera) were recorded visiting these flowers, but bees and hover flies were not. Aiphanes eggersii was thought to be pollinated by bees and possibly by wind. Fruit flies (Drosophilidae), hover flies (Syrphidae), biting midges (Ceratopogonidae) and leaf beetles (Chrysomelidae) were recorded visiting the flowers of A. erinacea, but bees were not. Aiphanes horrida was reportedly pollinated by wind, bees (Meliponidae), weevils (Curculionidae) and bugs (Hemiptera). Flies and weevils were observed on the flowers of A. simplex.

The fruit of A. horrida is rich in vitamins and energy and likely to be eaten by many animals. Oilbirds are reported to eat its fruit and disperse its seeds. Squirrels are also reported to consume the fruit, despite the spiny nature of the tree. The fruit, flowers and seeds of A. minima are consumed by the vulnerable Saint Vincent amazon (Amazona guildingii) and is also considered a potentially important food species for the critically endangered Puerto Rican amazon (Amazona vittata).

Several species show clumped distributions. Dispersal limitation has been invoked to explain the clumped distribution of adults and limited recruitment of seedlings in both A. erinacea in Ecuador and A. minima in Puerto Rico. Similarly, the rarity of A. lindeniana and A. simplex in Colombian forests may be linked to limited seed production and the limited effectiveness of seed dispersal by avian and mammalian frugivores.

== Uses ==
Aiphanes species have a long history of human use. The remains of carbonised seeds thought to belong to A. horrida have been found in archaeological sites in Colombia dating back to about 2800 BP; seeds of this species are still consumed and are traded in local markets. Aiphanes horrida is also widely planted as an ornamental, as is A. minima. The fruit or seeds of A. deltoidea, A. eggersii, A. linearis and A. minima are all consumed locally. The palm heart of A. macroloba is consumed by the Coaiquer people of northwestern South America. Aiphanol, a compound isolated from A. horrida, has shown significant inhibitory activity against cyclooxygenases; inhibition of these enzymes can provide relief from the symptoms of inflammation and pain.
