= Atitara =

Atitara may refer to:

- Atitara River
- Atitara Marcgr. ex Juss. (1805), a genus of plants considered a synonym of Euodia
- Atitara Barrère ex Kuntze (1891), a genus of plants considered a synonym of Desmoncus
