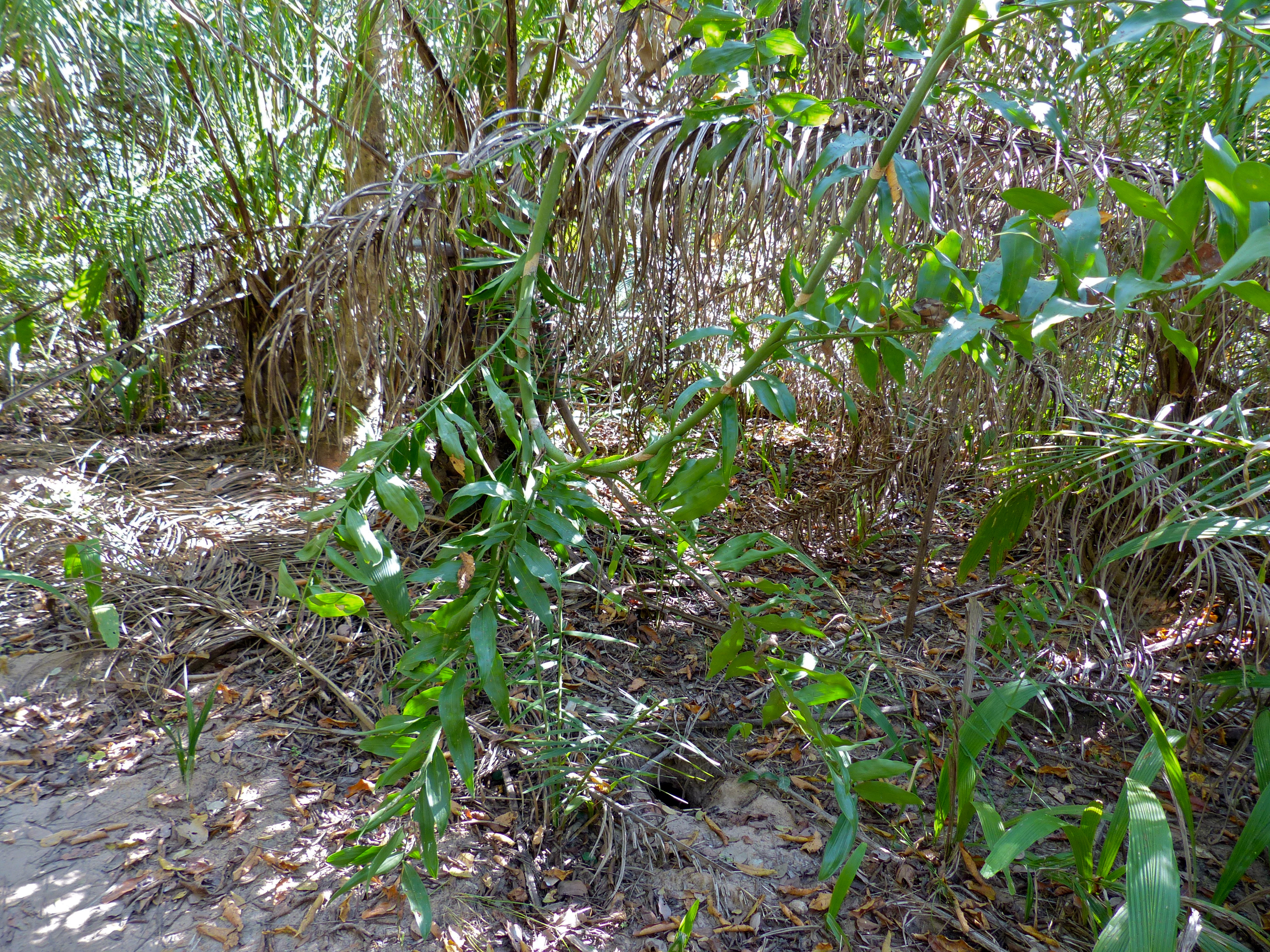

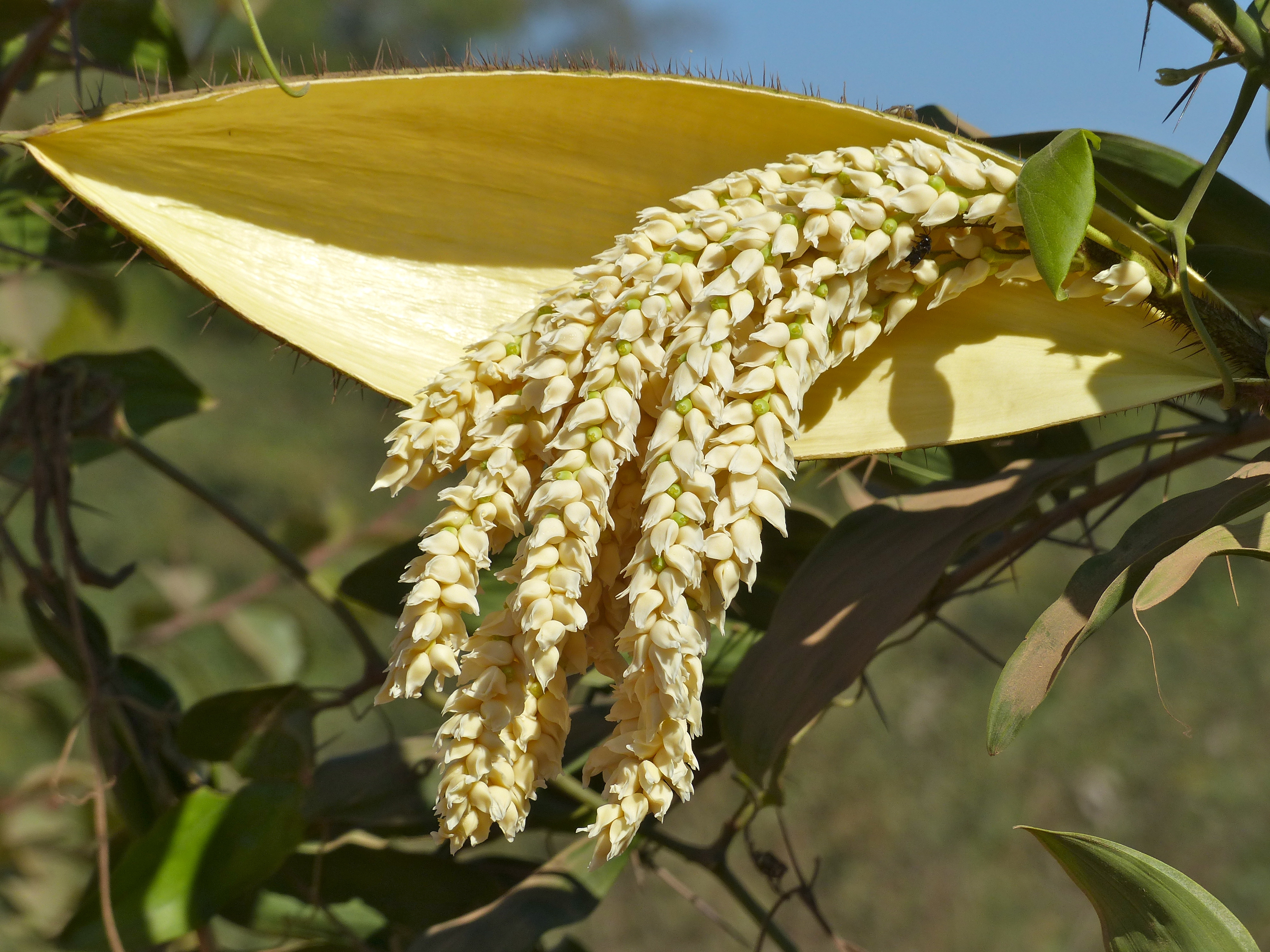
- D. orthacanthos plant and flowers

Scientific classification
- Kingdom: Plantae
- Clade: Tracheophytes
- Clade: Angiosperms
- Clade: Monocots
- Clade: Commelinids
- Order: Arecales
- Family: Arecaceae
- Genus: Desmoncus
- Species: D. orthacanthos

Binomial name
- Desmoncus orthacanthos Mart.

Synonyms
- Atitara orthacantha (Mart.) Kuntze; Desmoncus horridus Splitg. ex Mart. Desmoncus longifolius Mart. Desmoncus lophacanthos Mart. Desmoncus rudentum Mart. Desmoncus major Crueg. ex Griseb. Desmoncus ataxacanthus Barb.Rodr. Desmoncus palustris Trail; Desmoncus melanacanthos Mart. ex Drude; Desmoncus orthacanthos var. mitis Drude; Desmoncus orthacanthos var. trailianus Drude; Desmoncus macrocarpus Barb.Rodr. Atitara ataxacantha (Barb.Rodr.) Kuntze; Atitara chinantlensis (Liebm. ex Mart.) Kuntze; Atitara drudeana Kuntze; Atitara horrida (Splitg. ex Mart.) Kuntze; Atitara major (Crueg. ex Griseb.) Kuntze; Atitara palustris (Trail) Kuntze; Desmoncus cuyabaensis Barb.Rodr. Desmoncus prostratus Lindm. Atitara cuyabaensis (Barb.Rodr.) Barb.Rodr. Atitara lophacantha (Mart.) Barb.Rodr. Atitara macrocarpa (Barb.Rodr.) Barb.Rodr. Atitara prostrata (Lindm.) Barb.Rodr. Atitara rudenta (Mart.) Barb.Rodr. Desmoncus angustisectus Burret; Desmoncus luetzelburgii Burret; Desmoncus werdermannii Burret; Desmoncus huebneri Burret; Desmoncus leptochaete Burret; Desmoncus kuhlmannii Burret; Desmoncus myriacanthos Dugand; Desmoncus brittonii L.H.Bailey; Desmoncus hartii L.H.Bailey; Desmoncus tobagonis L.H.Bailey; Desmoncus apureanus L.H.Bailey; Desmoncus demeraranus L.H.Bailey & H.E.Moon; Desmoncus velezii L.H.Bailey; Desmoncus multijugus Steyerm.

= Desmoncus orthacanthos =

Species of palm

Desmoncus orthacanthos is a spiny, climbing palm native to tropical South America. Stems grow clustered together, and are 2–12 m long and 1.5–2 cm in diameter. Stems, leaf sheaths and often leaves are covered with black spines up to 6 cm long.

Desmoncus orthacanthos is found in Colombia, Venezuela, Trinidad and Tobago, Guyana, Suriname, French Guiana, Brazil, Bolivia, Ecuador and Peru. The stems are used for basket weaving.
