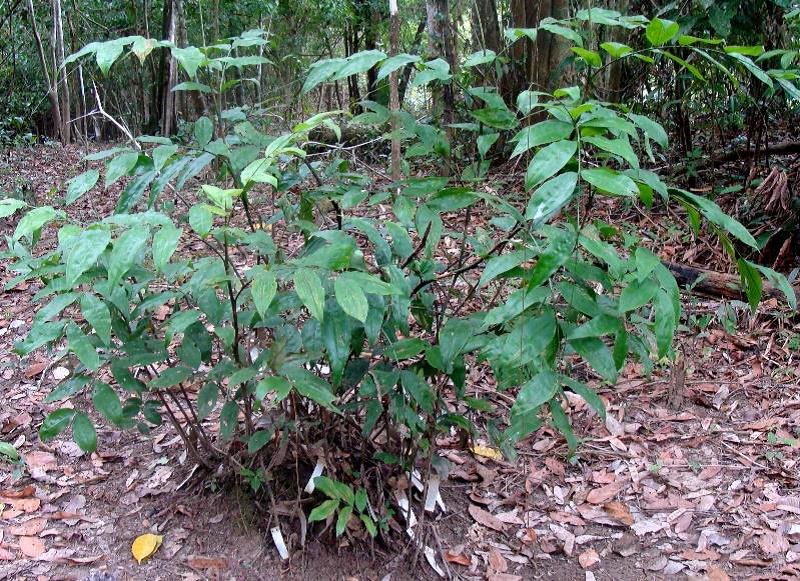

Scientific classification
- Kingdom: Plantae
- Clade: Tracheophytes
- Clade: Angiosperms
- Clade: Monocots
- Clade: Commelinids
- Order: Arecales
- Family: Arecaceae
- Genus: Desmoncus
- Species: D. polyacanthos

Binomial name
- Desmoncus polyacanthos Mart.

Synonyms
- Atitara polyacantha (Mart.) Kuntze: of var. polyacanthos; Desmoncus macroacanthos Mart. Desmoncus oxyacanthos Mart. Desmoncus pycnacanthos Mart. Desmoncus setosus Mart. Desmoncus riparius Spruce; Desmoncus oligacanthus Barb.Rodr. Desmoncus aereus Drude; Desmoncus leptoclonos Drude; Desmoncus phengophyllus Drude; Desmoncus polyacanthos var. cuspidatus Drude; Desmoncus polyacanthos var. oxyacanthos (Mart.) Drude; Desmoncus pycnacanthos var. sarmentosus Drude; Desmoncus caespitosus Barb.Rodr. Desmoncus philippianus Barb.Rodr. Atitara dubia Kuntze; Atitara macroacantha (Mart.) Kuntze; Atitara oligacantha (Barb.Rodr.) Kuntze; Atitara oxyacantha (Mart.) Kuntze; Atitara phengophylla (Drude) Kuntze; Atitara pycnacantha (Mart.) Kuntze; Atitara riparia (Spruce) Kuntze; Atitara setosa (Mart.) Kuntze; Desmoncus inermis Barb.Rodr. Atitara aerea (Drude) Barb.Rodr. Atitara caespitosa (Barb.Rodr.) Barb.Rodr. Atitara inermis (Barb.Rodr.) Barb.Rodr. Atitara leptoclona (Drude) Barb.Rodr. Atitara paraensis Barb.Rodr. Atitara philippiana (Barb.Rodr.) Barb.Rodr. Desmoncus paraensis (Barb.Rodr.) Barb.Rodr. Desmoncus ulei Dammer; Desmoncus brevisectus Burret; Desmoncus campylacanthus Burret; Desmoncus dasyacanthus Burret; Desmoncus latisectus Burret; Desmoncus longisectus Burret; Desmoncus prestoei L.H.Bailey; Desmoncus peraltus L.H.Bailey; Desmoncus maguirei L.H.Bailey; Desmoncus mirandanus L.H.Bailey; Desmoncus duidensis Steyerm.: of var. prunifer; Desmoncus prunifer Poepp. ex Mart. Atitara prunifera (Poepp. ex Mart.) Kuntze

= Desmoncus polyacanthos =

Species of palm

Desmoncus polyacanthos, the jacitara palm, is a spiny, climbing palm native to the southern Caribbean and tropical South America. Stems grow clustered together, and are 2–12 m long and 0.5–2 cm in diameter. Petioles, rachis, cirrus and peduncular bracts are covered with short, curved spines. Two varieties are recognised: D. polyacanthos var. polyacanthos and D. polyacanthos var. prunifer (Poepp. ex Mart.) A.J.Hend.

Desmoncus polyacanthos is found in Colombia, Venezuela, Saint Vincent and the Grenadines, Trinidad and Tobago, Guyana, Suriname, French Guiana, Brazil, Bolivia, Ecuador and Peru. The stems are used for baskets and sieves.
