= Aiphanes hirsuta =

Conservation status
- Least Concern (IUCN 3.1)

Scientific classification
- Kingdom: Plantae
- Clade: Tracheophytes
- Clade: Angiosperms
- Clade: Monocots
- Clade: Commelinids
- Order: Arecales
- Family: Arecaceae
- Genus: Aiphanes
- Species: A. hirsuta

Binomial name
- Aiphanes hirsuta Burret

Synonyms
- Aiphanes pachyclada Burret; Aiphanes fuscopubens L.H.Bailey; Aiphanes fosteriorum H.E.Moore; Aiphanes kalbreyeri Burret

Species of palm

Aiphanes hirsuta is a species of flowering plant in the family Arecaceae. It is found in Colombia, Costa Rica, Ecuador, and Panama.

Four subspecies are recognized:

1. Aiphanes hirsuta subsp. fosteriorum (H.E.Moore) Borchs. & R.Bernal - Colombia, Ecuador
2. Aiphanes hirsuta subsp. hirsuta - Colombia, Panama, Costa Rica
3. Aiphanes hirsuta subsp. intermedia Borchs. & R.Bernal - Colombia
4. Aiphanes hirsuta subsp. kalbreyeri (Burret) Borchs. & R.Bernal - Colombia
