= Aiphanes argos =

Conservation status
- Critically Endangered (IUCN 3.1)

Scientific classification
- Kingdom: Plantae
- Clade: Embryophytes
- Clade: Tracheophytes
- Clade: Angiosperms
- Clade: Monocots
- Clade: Commelinids
- Order: Arecales
- Family: Arecaceae
- Genus: Aiphanes
- Species: A. argos

Binomial name
- Aiphanes argos R.Bernal, Borchs. & Hoyos-Gómez

Species of flowering plant

Aiphanes argos is a plant in the family Arecaceae, native to Colombia.

== Description ==
Aiphanes argos grows as a small palm and is a rheophyte (a plant living in swift waters). The pinnae are very long and thin, an adaptation to its environment. Similarly, the stem is flexible and thin.

== Distribution and habitat ==
Aiphanes argos is endemic to Colombia, where it is confined to the canyon of the Samaná Norte River and the river's tributary streams, in Antioquia. Its habitat is on the banks of the canyon or tributaries, at elevations of 200–800 metres (700–2,600 ft). At high water on the river, the plant may be entirely submerged.

== Conservation ==
Aiphanes argos has been assessed as critically endangered on the IUCN Red List. The greatest risk to the species is the proposed construction of a hydroelectric power plant and dam on the Samaná Norte River. The dam would submerge most of the species' population in deep waters. Mining activities on the river pose an additional risk to the species' habitat. As of 2017, the population of Aiphanes argos was estimated at 600. The specific epithet argos refers to Grupo Argos, the company in charge of the dam project.
