= Aiphanes ulei =

Conservation status
- Least Concern (IUCN 2.3)

Scientific classification
- Kingdom: Plantae
- Clade: Tracheophytes
- Clade: Angiosperms
- Clade: Monocots
- Clade: Commelinids
- Order: Arecales
- Family: Arecaceae
- Genus: Aiphanes
- Species: A. ulei

Binomial name
- Aiphanes ulei (Dammer) Burret

Synonyms
- Martinezia ulei Dammer; Aiphanes schultzeana Burret

Species of plant

Aiphanes ulei is a species of flowering plant in the family Arecaceae. It is found in Brazil, Ecuador, and Peru.
