= Aiphanes verrucosa =

Conservation status
- Endangered (IUCN 3.1)

Scientific classification
- Kingdom: Plantae
- Clade: Embryophytes
- Clade: Tracheophytes
- Clade: Spermatophytes
- Clade: Angiosperms
- Clade: Monocots
- Clade: Commelinids
- Order: Arecales
- Family: Arecaceae
- Genus: Aiphanes
- Species: A. verrucosa

Binomial name
- Aiphanes verrucosa Borchs. & Balslev

Species of palm

Aiphanes verrucosa is a species of flowering plant in the family Arecaceae. It is found only in Ecuador. Its natural habitat is subtropical or tropical moist montane forests. It is threatened by habitat loss.
