= Aiphanes pilaris =

Conservation status
- Critically Endangered (IUCN 3.1)

Scientific classification
- Kingdom: Plantae
- Clade: Embryophytes
- Clade: Tracheophytes
- Clade: Angiosperms
- Clade: Monocots
- Clade: Commelinids
- Order: Arecales
- Family: Arecaceae
- Genus: Aiphanes
- Species: A. pilaris

Binomial name
- Aiphanes pilaris R.Bernal

Species of tree

Aiphanes pilaris is a plant in the family Arecaceae, native to Colombia.

== Description ==
Aiphanes pilaris grows as a palm tree up to 7 metres (20 ft) tall. The inflorescences feature long stalks and bear lilac flowers. The fruits turn brown when ripe.

== Distribution and habitat ==
Aiphanes pilaris is endemic to Colombia, where it is known only from Putumayo Department. Its habitat is in highland Andean forests, at elevations above 1,000 m (3,300 ft).

== Conservation ==
Aiphanes pilaris has been assessed as critically endangered on the IUCN Red List. The species is at risk from the expansion of agriculture for crop and livestock farming. The species is not in present in any protected areas.
