= Atitara River =

River in Tahiti, French Polynesia

Coordinates: 17.68°S 149.56°W

The Atitara is a river and valley of western Tahiti, French Polynesia. It flows into the sea at Pa'ea.
