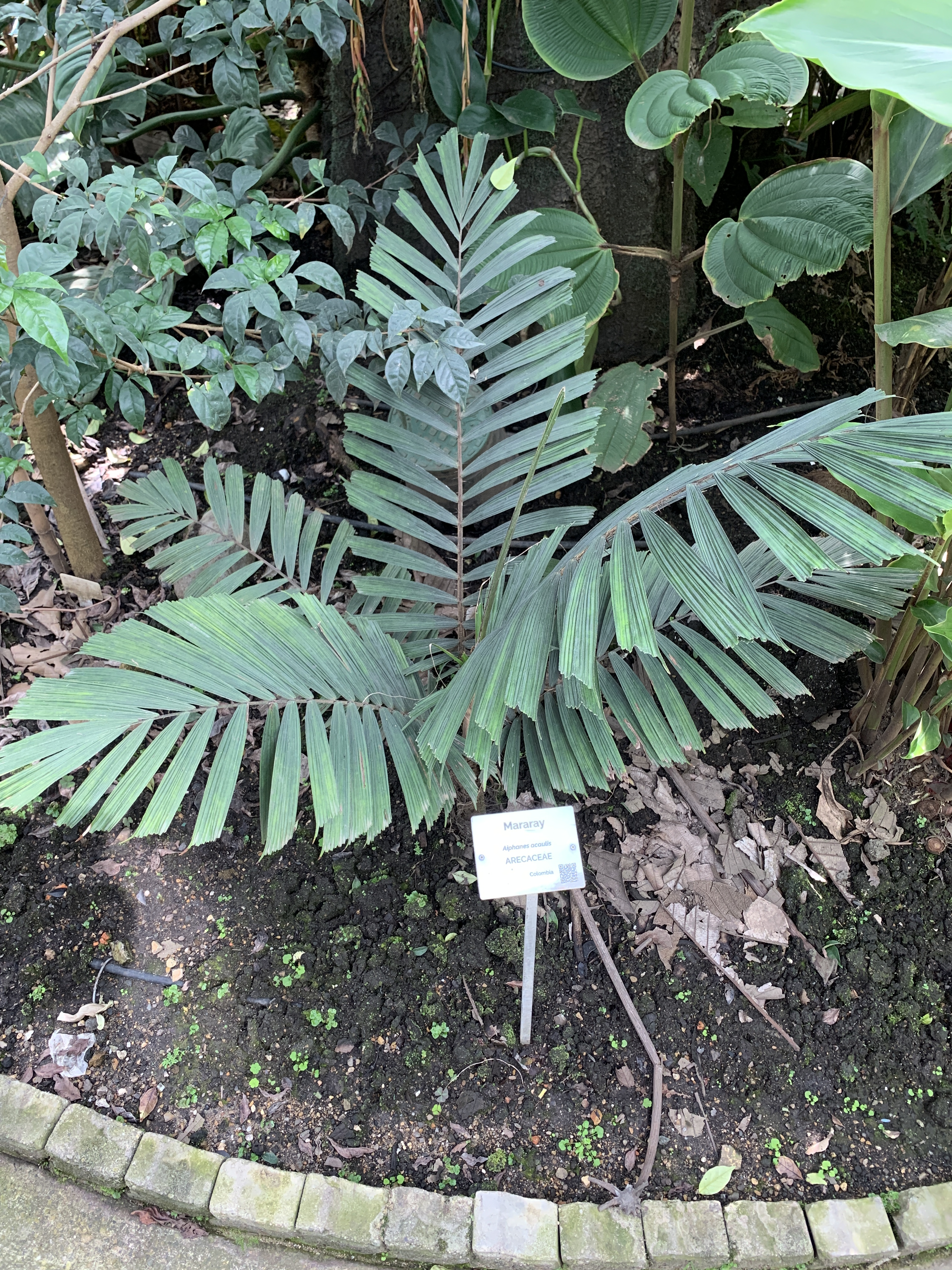

Scientific classification
- Kingdom: Plantae
- Clade: Tracheophytes
- Clade: Angiosperms
- Clade: Monocots
- Clade: Commelinids
- Order: Arecales
- Family: Arecaceae
- Genus: Aiphanes
- Species: A. acaulis

Binomial name
- Aiphanes acaulis Galeano & R.Bernal

= Aiphanes acaulis =

Species of palm

Aiphanes acaulis is a spiny palm endemic to western Colombia. It is acaulescent, as the specific epithet "acaulis" implies, – that is, the stem is short to the extent that it is difficult to see at all, and mostly subterranean. Plants have 8 to 10 leaves which are up to 1.5 metres (5 feet) long. The flowers are purple and are borne on an erect inflorescence.

Aiphanes acaulis is known from two small populations in the Chocó Department in western Colombia. It is found at wet lowland to premontane forest at an elevation of 150–700 m (500–2300') above sea level. The species is relatively new to science—a description of the species was first published in 1985, based on specimens collected in 1980. The species is similar in appearance to A. spicata, which is the only other acaulescent species of Aiphanes. Based on floral and pollen characters, the two species do not appear to the closely related.
