= Aiphanes grandis =

Conservation status
- Endangered (IUCN 3.1)

Scientific classification
- Kingdom: Plantae
- Clade: Embryophytes
- Clade: Tracheophytes
- Clade: Spermatophytes
- Clade: Angiosperms
- Clade: Monocots
- Clade: Commelinids
- Order: Arecales
- Family: Arecaceae
- Genus: Aiphanes
- Species: A. grandis

Binomial name
- Aiphanes grandis Borchs. & Balslev

Species of palm

Aiphanes grandis is a species of flowering plant in the family Arecaceae. It is found only in Ecuador. Its natural habitats are subtropical or tropical moist lowland forests and subtropical or tropical moist montane forests. It is threatened by habitat loss.
