= Bactridinae =

Scientific classification
- Kingdom: Plantae
- Clade: Tracheophytes
- Clade: Angiosperms
- Clade: Monocots
- Clade: Commelinids
- Order: Arecales
- Family: Arecaceae
- Subfamily: Arecoideae
- Tribe: Cocoseae
- Subtribe: Bactridinae

Tribe of palms

Bactridinae is a subtribe of plants in the family Arecaceae found in the New World. Genera in the subtribe are:

- Acrocomia – Americas
- Astrocaryum – Americas
- Aiphanes – NW South America, Caribbean
- Bactris – South America, Central America, Caribbean
- Desmoncus – South America, Central America

== See also ==
- List of Arecaceae genera
