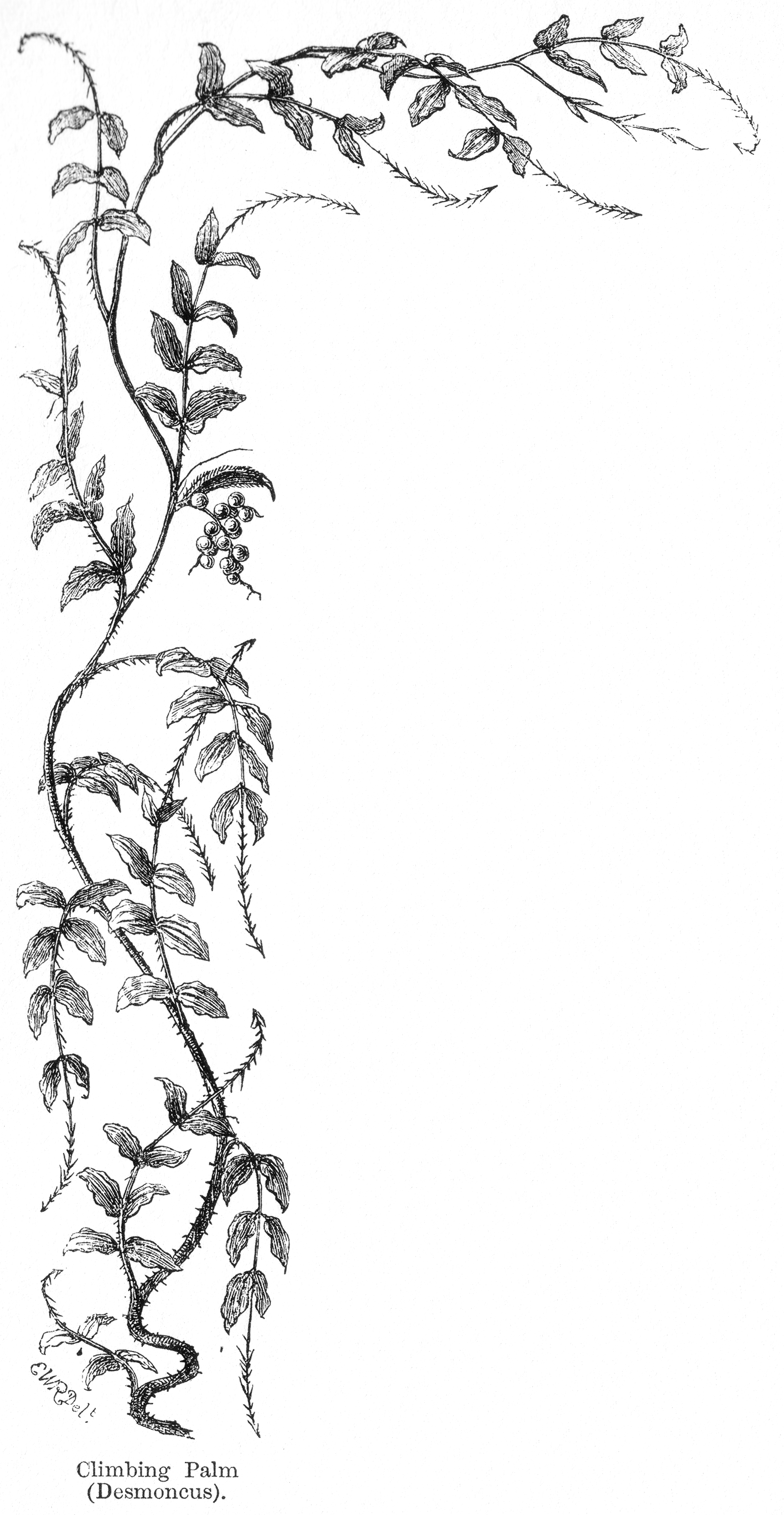
- 1863 Illustration from Naturalist on the River Amazons

Scientific classification
- Kingdom: Plantae
- Clade: Tracheophytes
- Clade: Angiosperms
- Clade: Monocots
- Clade: Commelinids
- Order: Arecales
- Family: Arecaceae
- Subfamily: Arecoideae
- Tribe: Cocoseae
- Genus: Desmoncus; Mart. (1824)

Synonyms
- Atitara Barrère ex Kuntze 1891, illegitimate homonym, not Marcgr. ex Juss. 1816; Desmonchus Desf., spelling variation

= Desmoncus =

Genus of plants

Desmoncus is a genus of mostly climbing, spiny palms native to the Neotropics. The genus extends from Mexico in the north to Brazil and Bolivia in the south, with two species present in the southeastern Caribbean (Trinidad and the Windward Islands).

== Description ==
Desmoncus is best known as a genus of climbing palms. Twenty-three of the 24 species recognised by Andrew Henderson in his revision of the genus are climbers; only one, D. stans is free-standing. Almost all Neotropical climbing palms belong to Desmoncus—the one exception being Chamaedorea elatior.

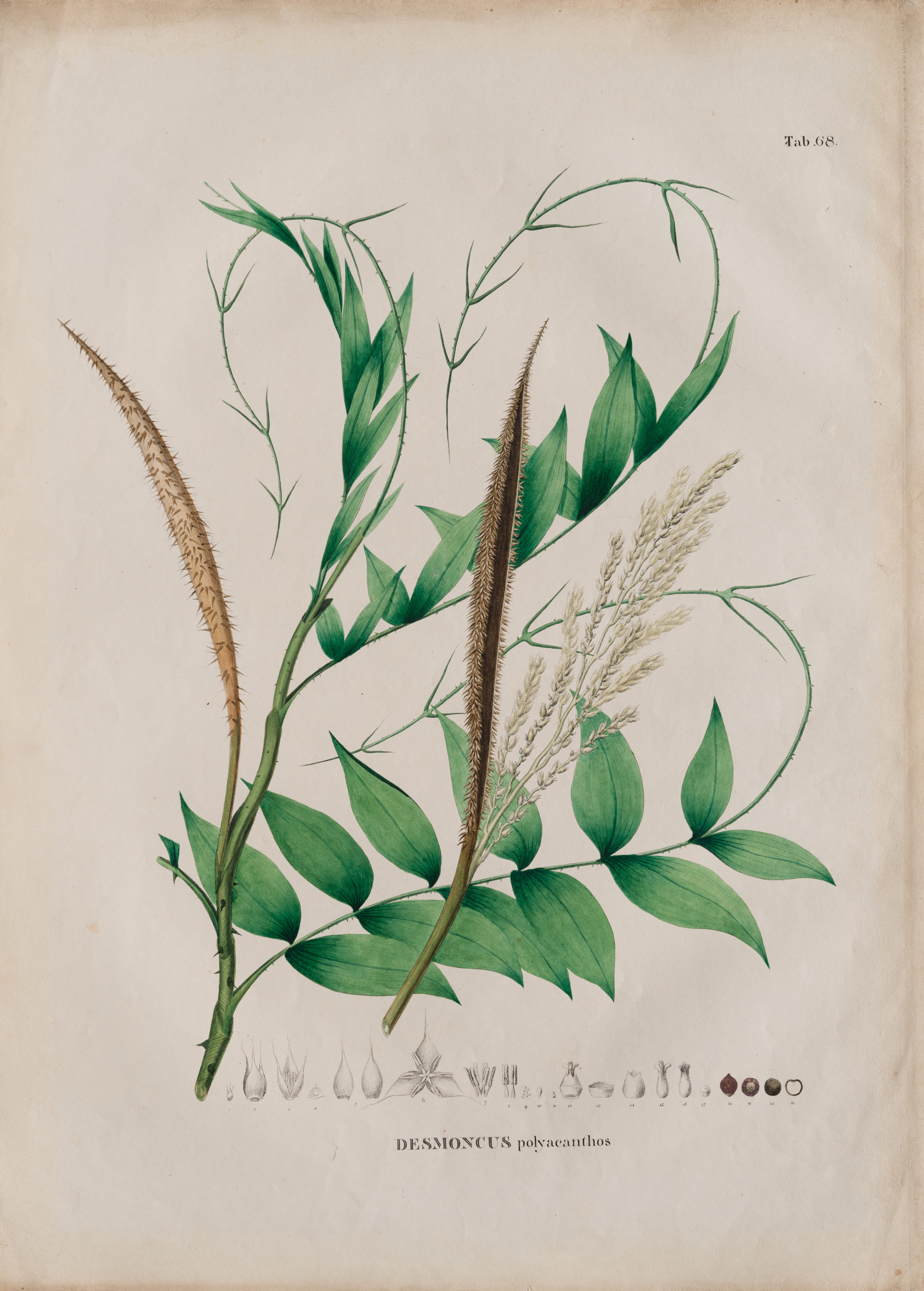
Carl Friedrich Philipp von Martius's drawing of Desmoncus polyacanthos shows the features of the leaf (sheath, petiole, rachis, leaflets, and cirrus) and the inflorescence with its associated bract.

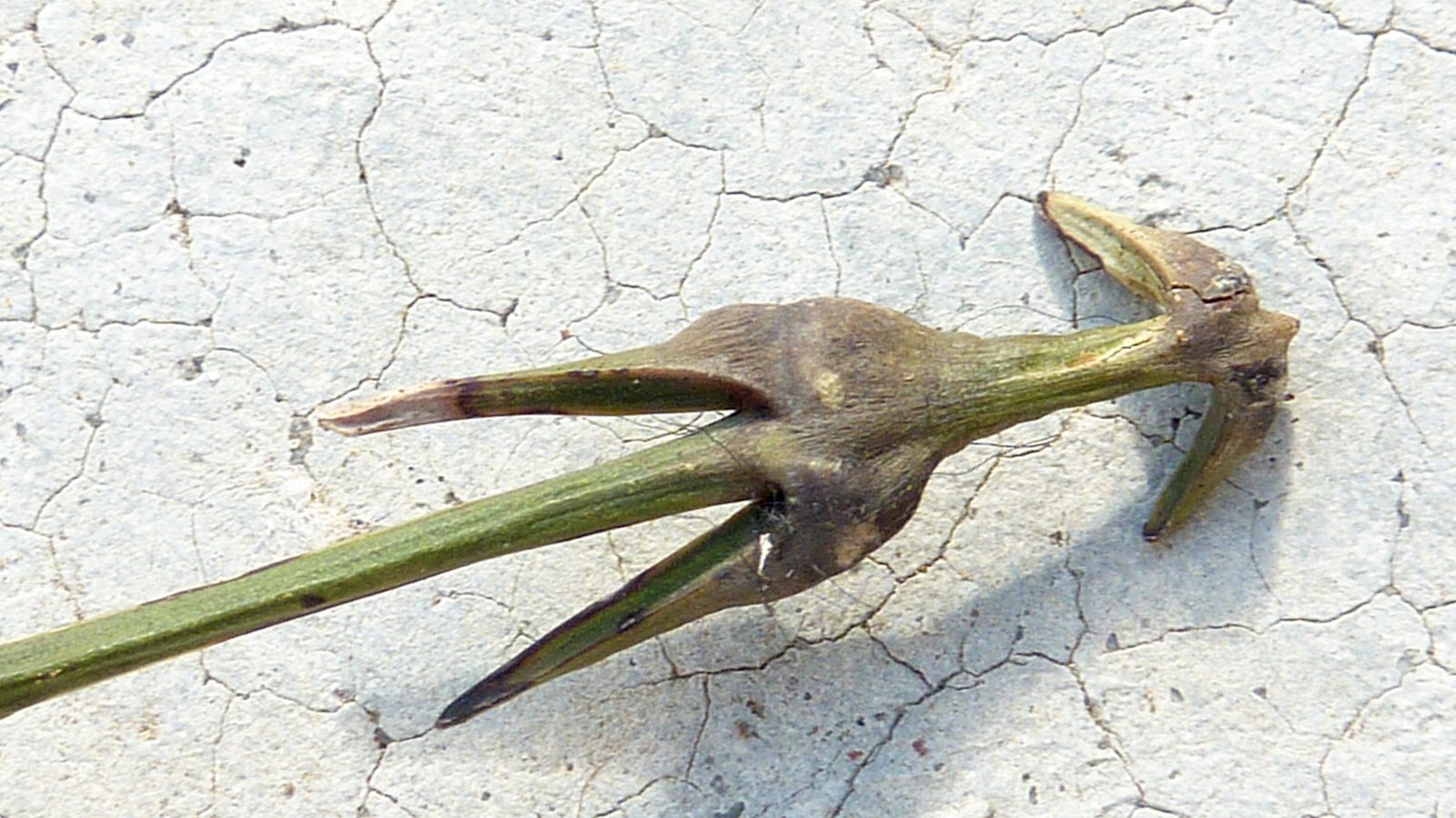
Most Desmoncus species climb using grappling hook-like structures called acanthophylls.

Desmoncus leaves are pinnately compound and are made up of a leaf sheath, petioles, rachis, and individual leaflets. The ends of the leaves are modified into a climbing structure called a cirrus. Instead of leaflets, the cirrus usually has grappling hook-like structures called acanthophylls; in some species the cirrus is less well developed and is almost absent in D. stans, the non-climbing species.

All parts of the leaves, including the leaflets themselves, are covered with spines. Most species have straight spines that are over 1 centimetre (0.4 in) long, but a few species have curved spines that are less than 1 cm long.

== Taxonomy ==
- - - Acrocomia
    - Desmoncus
  - - Aiphanes
    - - Astrocaryum
      - Bactris

Simplified diagram of the relationship between members of the subtribe Bactridinae, based on plastid and nuclear DNA phylogeny.

- - Desmoncus orthacanthos
  - - Bactris gasipaes
    - - Aiphanes aculeata*
      - - Acrocomia crispa
        - Acrocomia aculeata

Relationship between members of the subtribe Bactridinae, based on plastid DNA phylogeny. *Aiphanes aculeata is a botanical synonym of A. horrida.

John Dransfield and colleagues put Desmoncus in the subfamily Arecoideae, the tribe Cocoseae and the subtribe Bactridinae, together with Aiphanes, Acrocomia, Astrocaryum and Bactris.

The genus was described by Carl Friedrich Philipp von Martius in 1824. The first species described was D. polyacanthos. Martius later described six additional species that he placed in the genus. In this 1881 Flora Brasiliensis, Carl Georg Oscar Drude recognised 17 species. João Barbosa Rodrigues recognised 28 species in his 1903 work Setum Palmarum Brasiliensis.

Max Burret published a revision of the entire genus in 1934. Burret described nine new species and ended up recognising a total of 41 species. In the 1940s, Liberty Hyde Bailey added 14 additional species to the genus Desmoncus. Jan Wessels Boer rejected the species concept used by Bailey, Barbosa Rodrigues, and Burret as being too narrow and ended up recognising only seven species In his 2011 revision of the genus, Andrew Henderson recognised 24 species.

== Distribution ==
Desmoncus ranges from Mexico in the north to Bolivia and Brazil in the south. Most species occur at lower elevations, but some species range as high as 1,000 metres (3,300 ft) above sea level. The species are mostly found in lowland tropical rainforest. Twelve species occur in Colombia, the most species-rich country, while 10 are found in Brazil.

== Species ==
24 species are accepted.

- Desmoncus chinantlensis Liebm. ex Mart. – southern Mexico and Central America (Veracruz to Nicaragua)
- Desmoncus cirrhifer A.H.Gentry & Zardini – Panama, Colombia, Ecuador
- Desmoncus costaricensis (Kuntze) Burret – Costa Rica
- Desmoncus giganteus A.J.Hend. – Colombia, Ecuador, Peru, western Brazil
- Desmoncus horridus Splitg. ex Mart. – Trinidad, Venezuela, the Guianas, Colombia, Ecuador, Peru, Bolivia, Brazil
- Desmoncus interjectus A.J.Hend. – Colombia
- Desmoncus kunarius de Nevers ex A.J.Hend. – Panama
- Desmoncus latisectus Burret – Bolivia
- Desmoncus leptoclonos Drude – Paraguay, Brazil
- Desmoncus loretanus A.J.Hend. – Loreto region of Peru
- Desmoncus madrensis A.J.Hend. – Peru
- Desmoncus mitis Mart. – Brazil, Bolivia, Peru, Ecuador, Colombia
- Desmoncus moorei A.J.Hend. – Nicaragua, Costa Rica
- Desmoncus myriacanthos Dugand. – Panama, Colombia, Venezuela
- Desmoncus obovoideus A.J.Hend. – Panama
- Desmoncus orthacanthos Mart. – eastern Brazil
- Desmoncus osensis A.J.Hend. – Costa Rica
- Desmoncus parvulus L.H.Bailey – Venezuela, Colombia, northwestern Brazil, the Guianas
- Desmoncus polyacanthos Mart. – Trinidad, Windward Islands, Venezuela, the Guianas, Colombia, Ecuador, Peru, Bolivia, Brazil
- Desmoncus prunifer Poepp. ex Mart. – Loreto region of Peru
- Desmoncus pumilus Trail. – Colombia, northwestern Brazil
- Desmoncus setosus Mart. – Colombia, northwestern Brazil
- Desmoncus stans Grayum & Nevers – Costa Rica
- Desmoncus vacivus L.H.Bailey – Colombia, northwestern Brazil, Peru
