= Rodrigo Bernal =

Colombian botanist (b. 1959)

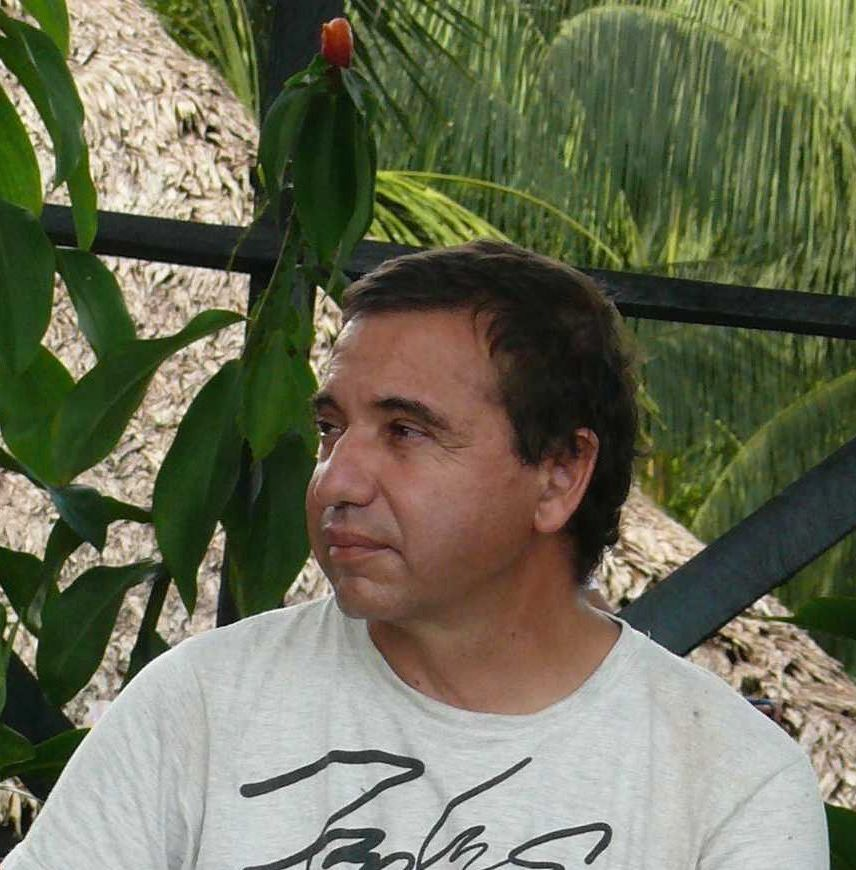
- Born: June 6, 1959 (age 67); Medellín, Colombia
- Education: University of Aarhus
- Scientific career
- Fields: Botany

Rodrigo Bernal González (born June 6, 1959 in Medellín) is a Colombian botanist who specialises in the palm family. Bernal was a faculty member at the Institute of Natural Sciences, National University of Colombia until 2007. He received his Ph.D. from the University of Aarhus, Denmark, in 1996. He was general curator of the National Colombian Herbarium (1986-1987), and editor of the scientific journal Caldasia (1989-1991, 1997-1999).

Bernal has published five books and 105 scientific papers and book chapters, most on them on palm systematics, ecology, uses and conservation. He has described one new genus (Sabinaria) and 25 new species of palms in the genera Aiphanes, Astrocaryum, Bactris, Chamaedorea, Geonoma, Oenocarpus, Sabinaria, Socratea, and Wettinia. He has described also new species in the plant families Cyclanthaceae, Sapindaceae, and Caprifoliaceae.

Bernal coauthored a Field Guide to the Palms of the Americas and a field guide to the palms of Colombia (2010). Bernal is also coauthor of Common Names of Plants in Colombia, an online dictionary of over 18,000 common names applied to plants in Colombia, which provides information on the distribution of each name, and its corresponding scientific name. Since 2001 he has coordinated the production of the Catalogue of the Plants of Colombia , a checklist of the ca. 30,000 plant species occurring in Colombia. The production of this work involves 171 botanists in 19 countries. Since 2007 Bernal has been involved in building up the National Collection of Colombian Palms, an initiative to gather living specimens of all native Colombian palms at the Quindío Botanic Garden, in Calarcá. In 1996 he received the Sciences Award of the Fundación Alejandro Angel Escobar for In 1996 for the Field guide to American palms (co-authored by Andrew Henderson & Gloria Galeano Garcés).

== Books ==
- Aprovechamiento sostenible de palmas colombianas. Editorial Universidad Nacional de Colombia. Instituto de Ciencias Naturales-Universidad Nacional de Colombia, Bogotá. 244 pp. ISBN 978-958-761-611-8
- Galeano, G. & R. Bernal. 2010. Palmas de Colombia. Guía de Campo. Editorial Universidad Nacional de Colombia, Bogotá. 688 pp. ISBN 978-958-719-501-9
- Henderson, A., G. Galeano and R. Bernal. 1995. Field Guide to the Palms of the Americas. Princeton University Press, Princeton, New Jersey. 352 pp., 256 photos, 553 maps. ISBN 0-691-01600-3
- Galeano, G. y R. Bernal. 1987. Las Palmas del Departamento de Antioquia. Región Occidental. Universidad Nacional de Colombia, Centro Editorial, Bogotá. ISBN 958-170005-6

== New species of plants discovered ==
=== Arecaceae ===
- Aiphanes acaulis Galeano & R.Bernal – Principes 29(1): 20. 1985
- Aiphanes argos R.Bernal, Borchs. & Hoyos-Gómez – Phytotaxa 298(1): 66. 2017
- Aiphanes bicornis Cerón & R.Bernal – Caldasia 26(2): 433 (-437; fig. 1). 2004
- Aïphanes buenaventurae R.Bernal & Borchs. – Caldasia 32(1): 117 (-119; fig. 1a-b). 2010
- Aiphanes graminifolia Galeano & R.Bernal – Caldasia 24(2): 277 (-280; fig. 1). 2002
- Aïphanes multiplex R.Bernal & Borchs. – Caldasia 32(1): 119 (-121; fig. 2). 2010
- Aiphanes pilaris R.Bernal – Caldasia 23(1): 163 (2001)
- Aiphanes spicata Borchs. & R.Bernal – Fl. Neotrop. Monogr. 70: 78. 1996
- Aiphanes tricuspidata Borchs., R.Bernal & Ruiz – Brittonia 41: 156, fig. 1989
- Astrocaryum triandrum Galeano, R.Bernal & F.Kahn – Candollea 43(1): 279 (1988)
- Bactris rostrata Galeano & R.Bernal – Caldasia 24(2): 280 (-283; fig. 2). 2002
- Chamaedorea ricardoi R.Bernal, Galeano & Hodel – Palms 48(1): 27 (-29; fig. 1). 2004
- Geonoma santanderensis Galeano & R.Bernal – Caldasia 24(2): 282 (-284; fig. 3). 2002
- Geonoma wilsonii Galeano & R.Bernal – Caldasia 24(2):284 (-290; figs. 4-5). 2002
- Oenocarpus makeru R.Bernal, Galeano & A.J.Hend. – Brittonia 43(3): 158 (1991)
- Oenocarpus simplex R.Bernal, Galeano & A.J.Hend. – Brittonia 43(3): 154 (1991)
- Sabinaria R.Bernal & Galeano – Phytotaxa 144: 28. 2013
- Sabinaria magnifica Galeano & R. Bernal – Phytotaxa 144: 34
- Socratea montana R.Bernal & A.J.Hend. – Brittonia 38(1): 55 (1986)
- Wettinia aequatorialis R.Bernal – Caldasia 17(82–85): 369 (1995)
- Wettinia disticha (R.Bernal) R.Bernal – Caldasia 17(82–85): 368 (1995)
- Wettinia lanata R.Bernal – Caldasia 17(82–85): 371 (1995)
- Wettinia minima R.Bernal – Caldasia 17(82–85): 373 (1995)
- Wettinia oxycarpa Galeano & R.Bernal – Caldasia 13(65): 695 (1983)

=== Cyclanthaceae ===
- Asplundia harlingiana Galeano & R.Bernal – Caldasia 14: 27 (-28). 1984.
- Asplundia sanctae-ritae Galeano & R.Bernal – Caldasia 14: 28 (-29). 1984.
- Asplundia sarmentosa Galeano & R.Bernal – Caldasia 14: 29 (-30). 1984.
- Dicranopygium fissile Galeano & R.Bernal – Caldasia 14: 31, figs. 1984.
- Dicranopygium scoparum Galeano & R.Bernal – Caldasia 14: 32, figs. 1984.

=== Sapindaceae ===
- Paullinia trifoliolata Obando, R.Bernal & Acev.-Rodr. – Caldasia 26(1): 61-64; fig. 1. 2004

=== Caprifoliaceae ===
- Valeriana neglecta R.Bernal – Kew Bull. 64(4): 723 (-725; fig. 1).2010

== Plants named after Bernal ==
- Dichapetalum bernalii Prance – Brittonia 40(4): 441, f. 1. 1988. (Dichapetalaceae)
- Chigua bernalii Stevenson – Memoirs of the New York Botanical Garden 57: 170, f. 1I. 1990. (Zamiaceae)
- Orphanodendron bernalii Barneby & Grimes – Brittonia 42(4): 249-253, f. 1-2. 1990. (Fabaceae)
- Anthurium bernalii Croat – Aroideana 32: 45–48, 5a–d. 2009. (Araceae)
- Geonoma bernalii A.J.Hend. – Phytotaxa 17: 38. 2011. (Arecaceae)
- Cyperus bernalii G.C.Tucker & F.Verloove – Phytotaxa 362 (3): 287–291. 2018. (Cyperaceae)
