= Max Burret =

German botanist (1883–1964)

Karl Ewald Maximilian Burret
- Born: June 6, 1883
- Died: September 19, 1964 (aged 78)
- Scientific career
- Fields: Botany
- Author abbrev. (botany): Burret

Karl Ewald Maximilian Burret, commonly known as Max Burret (6 June 1883 – 19 September 1964) was a German botanist.

Burret was born in Saffig near Andernach in the Prussian Rhine Province. He originally studied law at Lausanne and Munich at the instigation of his father. Burret had a greater interest in natural science than in law, and he eventually abandoned his law studies to conduct botanical research in Berlin, where he earned a Ph.D. in 1909 for his taxonomic thesis, and quickly became one of Germany's most prominent botanists. Burret participated in many botanical science organizations in Germany, taking up leadership positions, such as assistant at the Berlin Botanical Museum and Garden from 1909 to 1911, as well as botanical assistant and lecturer at the Botanical Institute of the Agricultural College in Berlin in 1911 through 1921. In 1922 he was appointed custodian of the Botanical Museum and Garden in Berlin, and later appointed to professor of botanical biology at Berlin University.

Burret made numerous travels in Europe and Africa, as well as South America. He was invited by the Brazilian government to make a trip to that country, specifically for the study of the various species of palm trees indigenous to the region. Shortly after his return to Germany, he voyaged to the Old World tropics, visiting Sri Lanka, the Malay Peninsula, Java, and Sumatra in 1938 and 1939. Burret was among the first botanists to conduct ground-breaking research on palms, beginning in Africa and later in South America and Indomalaysia. He identified, named and classified dozens of palm species, including Rhapis multifida (finger palm) and Livistona beccariana. He also named and classified other tropical flora, chiefly those of the linden family. The names of several genera of palm trees were named after him, including the genera Maxburretia and Burretiokentia.

Burret is the author of numerous systematic papers on the floral families Tiliaceae (the linden family) and Palmae (the palm family). He died in Berlin.
