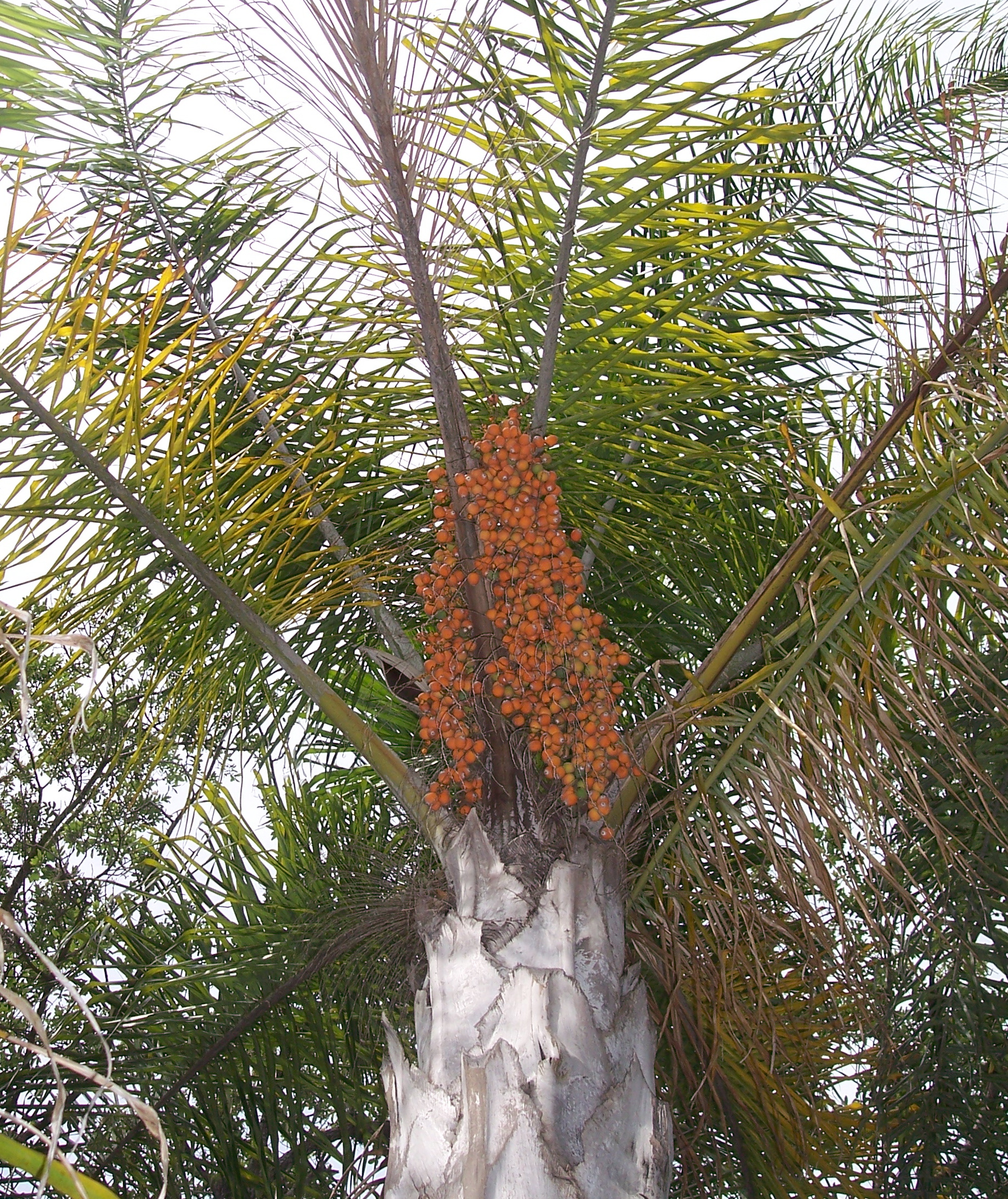
- Syagrus romanzoffiana

Scientific classification
- Kingdom: Plantae
- Clade: Tracheophytes
- Clade: Angiosperms
- Clade: Monocots
- Clade: Commelinids
- Order: Arecales
- Family: Arecaceae
- Subfamily: Arecoideae
- Tribe: Cocoseae
- Subtribe: Attaleinae
- Genus: Syagrus; Mart.

Synonyms
- Arecastrum (Drude) Becc.; Arikury Becc.; Arikuryroba Barb.Rodr.; Barbosa Becc.; Chrysallidosperma H.E.Moore; Glaziova Devansaye, nom. illeg.; Langsdorffia Raddi; Lytocaryum Toledo; Microcoelum Burret & Potztal; Platenia H.Karst.; Rhyticocos Becc.

= Syagrus (plant) =

Genus of palms

Syagrus is a genus of Arecaceae (palms), native to South America, with one species endemic to the Lesser Antilles. The genus is closely related to the Cocos, or coconut genus, and many Syagrus species produce edible seeds similar to the coconut.

== Description ==
Palms in this genus usually have solitary stems; clustered stems are less common, and a few are stolon-like subterranean. The stems are normally spineless, but some species have spiny leaf sheaths or spines. Those species that have upright trunks grow 2–36 metres (7–118 ft) tall with stems that are 6–35 centimetres (2.4–13.8 in) in diameter.

The leaves of all but one species, S. smithii, are pinnately compound. Leaf sheaths are split along their entire length, and consequently, crownshafts are not present in this genus. The transition from the leaf sheath to the petiole can be gradual and difficult to identify, but in species where they can be distinguished, leaf sheaths are 2.5–180 cm (1–71 in) long and the petioles are 0–30 cm (0–12 in).

The inflorescences are unbranched or branch once; a single hybrid, S. × lacerdamourae, occasionally shows second-order branching, and emerge from between the leaves. They are monoecious, with both male and female flowers borne in the same inflorescence. The fruit are drupes, which vary in colour from green to orange to brown. They range in size from 1.2 to 1.9 cm (0.47 to 0.75 in) in length, and 0.7 to 4.5 cm (0.28 to 1.77 in) in diameter.

== Taxonomy ==
- - Beccariophoenix
  - - Voanioala
    - Jubaeopsis
- - - Cocos nucifera
    - - Syagrus
      - Lytocaryum (nested within Syagrus)
  - - - - - Allagoptera
          - Polyandrococos
        - Parajubaea
      - - Butia
        - Jubaea
    - Attalea

Simplified phylogeny of members of the subtribe Attaleinae, based on seven WRKY gene loci.

Syagrus has been placed in the subfamily Arecoideae, the tribe Cocoseae and the subtribe Attaleinae, together with the genera Allagoptera, Attalea, Beccariophoenix, Butia, Cocos, Jubaea, Jubaeopsis, Parajubaea, and Voanioala.

The genus Lytocaryum is now included in Syagrus. It has been treated as a distinct genus, differentiated only by abundant tomentum, strongly versatile anthers, and slight differences in the pericarp.

=== Species ===
As of May 2024, Plants of the World Online accepted the following species and hybrids:

- Syagrus allagopteroides Noblick & Lorenzi
- Syagrus amara (Jacq.) Mart. – overtop palm
- Syagrus amicorum K.Soares & C.A.Guim.
- Syagrus angustifolia Noblick & Lorenzi
- Syagrus aristeae B.F.Sant'Anna-Santos
- Syagrus botryophora (Mart.) Mart.
- Syagrus caerulescens Noblick & Lorenzi
- Syagrus campestris (Mart.) Bomhard
- Syagrus campylospatha (Barb.Rodr.) Becc.
- Syagrus cardenasii Glassman
- Syagrus cataphracta (Mart.) Noblick
- Syagrus cearensis Noblick
- Syagrus cerqueirana Noblick & Lorenzi
- Syagrus cocoides Mart.
- Syagrus comosa (Mart.) Mart.
- Syagrus coronata (Mart.) Becc. – licuri palm
- Syagrus deflexa Noblick & Lorenzi
- Syagrus duartei Glassman
- Syagrus elata (L.R.Moreno & O.I.Moreno) Noblick
- Syagrus emasensis Noblick & Lorenzi
- Syagrus evansiana Noblick
- Syagrus flexuosa (Mart.) Becc.
- Syagrus glaucescens Glaz. ex Becc.
- Syagrus glazioviana (Dammer) Becc.
- Syagrus gouveiana Noblick & Lorenzi
- Syagrus graminifolia (Drude) Becc.
- Syagrus guaratingensis Noblick
- Syagrus guimaraesensis Noblick & Lorenzi
- Syagrus harleyi Glassman
- Syagrus hoehnei Burret, syn. Lytocaryum hoehnei
- Syagrus inajai (Spruce) Becc.
- Syagrus insignis (Devansaye) Becc., syn. Lytocaryum insigne
- Syagrus itacambirana Noblick & Lorenzi
- Syagrus itapebiensis (Noblick & Lorenzi) Noblick & Meerow, syn. Lytocaryum itapebiense
- Syagrus kellyana Noblick & Lorenzi
- Syagrus lilliputiana (Barb.Rodr.) Becc.
- Syagrus loefgrenii Glassman
- Syagrus longipedunculata Noblick & Lorenzi
- Syagrus lorenzoniorum Noblick & Lorenzi
- Syagrus macrocarpa Barb.Rodr.
- Syagrus mendanhensis Glassman
- Syagrus menzeliana Noblick & Lorenzi
- Syagrus microphylla Burret
- Syagrus minor Noblick & Lorenzi
- Syagrus oleracea (Mart.) Becc.
- Syagrus orinocensis (Spruce) Burret
- Syagrus petraea (Mart.) Becc.
- Syagrus picrophylla Barb.Rodr.
- Syagrus pimentae Noblick
- Syagrus pleioclada Burret
- Syagrus pleiocladoides Noblick & Lorenzi
- Syagrus pompeoi K. Soares & R. Pimenta
- Syagrus procumbens Noblick & Lorenzi
- Syagrus pseudococos (Raddi) Glassman
- Syagrus romanzoffiana (Cham.) Glassman – queen palm
- Syagrus rupicola Noblick & Lorenzi
- Syagrus ruschiana (Bondar) Glassman
- Syagrus sancona (Kunth) H. Karst.
- Syagrus santosii K. Soares & C.A. Guim.
- Syagrus schizophylla (Mart.) Glassman – arikury palm
- Syagrus smithii (H.E.Moore) Glassman
- Syagrus stenopetala Burret
- Syagrus stratincola Wess.Boer
- Syagrus vagans (Bondar) A.D. Hawkes
- Syagrus vermicularis Noblick
- Syagrus weddelliana (H.Wendl.) Becc., syn. Lytocaryum weddellianum
- Syagrus werdermannii Burret
- Syagrus yungasensis M. Moraes

==== Hybrids ====
- Syagrus × altopalacioensis K.Soares & L.C.Assis
- Syagrus × andrequiceana K.Soares & L.C.Assis
- Syagrus × campos-portoana (Bondar) Glassman
- Syagrus × cipoensis K.Soares & L.C.Assis
- Syagrus × costae Glassman
- Syagrus × lacerdamourae K.Soares & C.A.Guim.
- Syagrus × matafome (Bondar) A.D.Hawkes
- Syagrus × mirandana Noblick
- Syagrus × serroana K.Soares & L.C.Assis
- Syagrus × teixeirana Glassman
- Syagrus × tostana (Bondar) Glassman

=== Formerly placed here ===
- Butia campicola (Barb.Rodr.) Noblick (as S. campicola (Barb.Rodr.) Becc.)
- Butia capitata (Mart.) Becc. (as S. capitata (Mart.) Glassman)
- Butia eriospatha (Mart. ex Drude) Becc. (as S. eriospatha (Mart. ex Drude) Glassman)
- Butia paraguayensis (Barb.Rodr.) L.H.Bailey (as S. paraguayensis (Barb.Rodr.) Glassman)
- Butia yatay (Mart.) Becc. (as S. dyerana (Barb. Rodr.) Becc. and S. yatay (Mart.) Glassman)

== Distribution ==
Syagrus is an almost entirely South American genus. The only non-South American species, S. amara, is endemic to five islands in the Lesser Antilles. The genus is found from sea level to elevations of 1,800 metres (5,900 ft)above sea level.

== Ecology ==
S. coronata nuts are the favored food of Lear's macaw, whose bill size and shape are particularly adapted to crack them.

Syagrus species are used as food plants by the larvae of some Lepidoptera species including Batrachedra nuciferae (recorded on S. coronae) and Paysandisia archon (recorded on S. romanzoffiana).

== Cultivation and uses ==
Syagrus weddellianum is a commonly potted plant throughout Europe. It prefers shade and rich, friable, quickly draining soil with some acidity.
