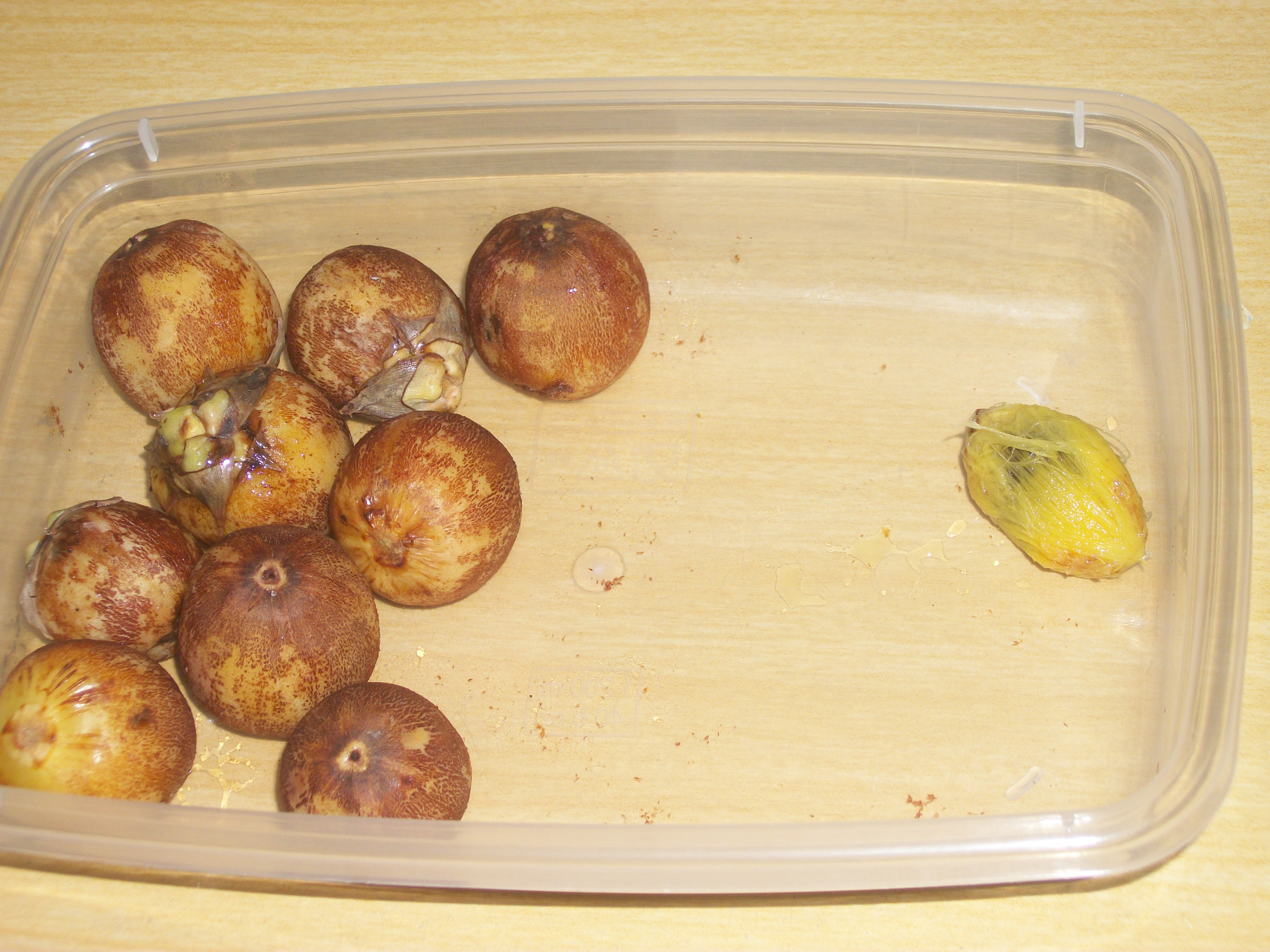
- Appearance of the fruit

Scientific classification
- Kingdom: Plantae
- Clade: Tracheophytes
- Clade: Angiosperms
- Clade: Monocots
- Clade: Commelinids
- Order: Arecales
- Family: Arecaceae
- Genus: Syagrus
- Species: S. cearensis

Binomial name
- Syagrus cearensis Noblick

= Syagrus cearensis =

Species of palm

Syagrus cearensis (Portuguese: coco-babão) is a natural palm endemic to Brazil.

It is native to the states of Piauí, Rio Grande do Norte, Paraíba, Pernambuco, and Ceará Its highest rate of occurrence is within Ceará state, used in the species name.

In the state of Ceará, it occurs in environments of Atlantic Forest and sandbanks, and also occurs in the transition to "Caatinga scrub, and on the slopes of the plateaus.

It is very similar to the species Syagrus oleracea, but is distinguished by the fruit, which has yellow flesh while S. oleracea has predominantly green fruits even when mature, and also S. cearensis has habit of growth in clumps, rather than the upright growth of the other species. Its fruit is a yellow fibro-mucilaginous drupe with a sweet taste, which is often sold in street markets in their places of origin.
