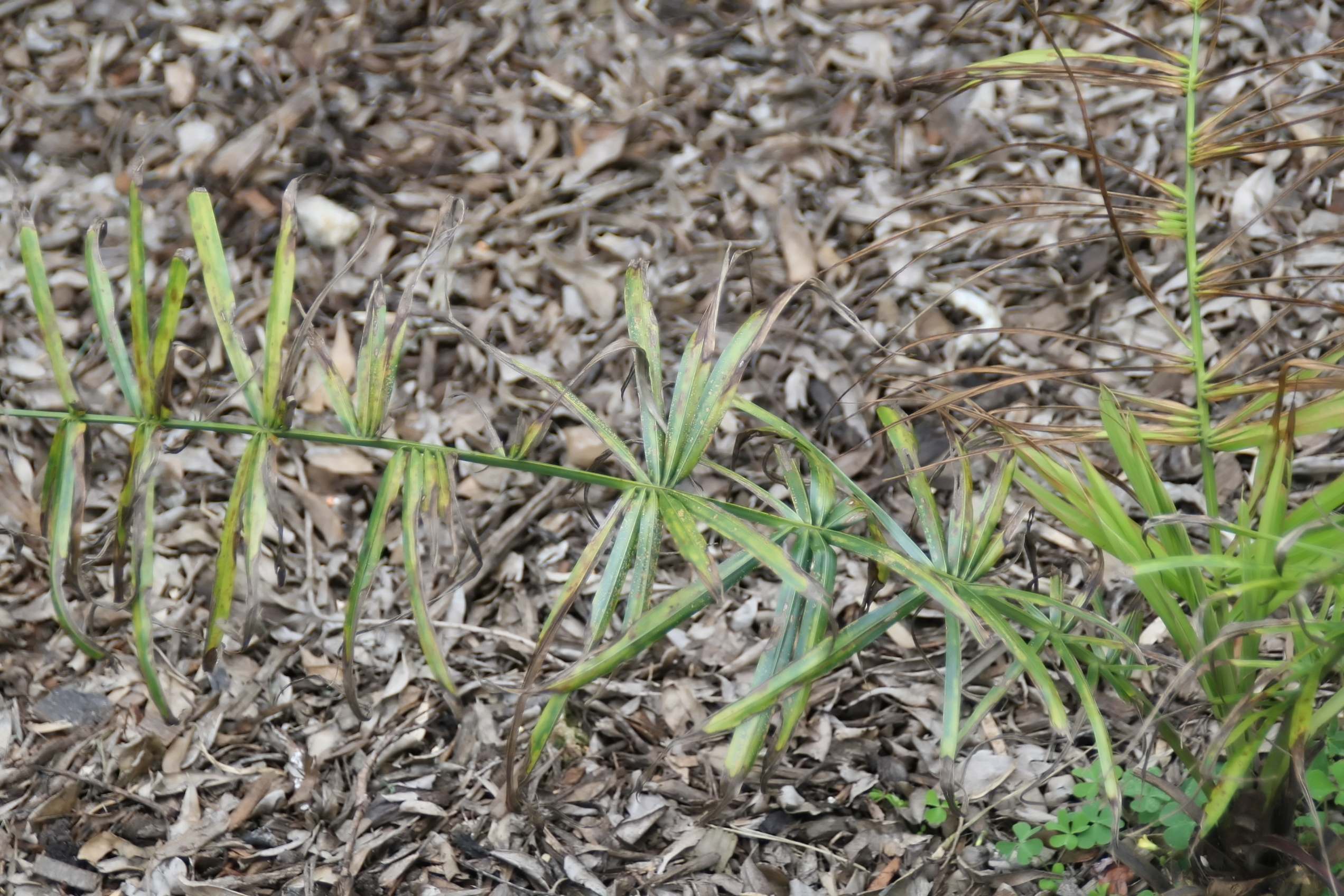
- In Fairchild Tropical Botanic Garden, Florida

Conservation status
- Endangered (IUCN 2.3)

Scientific classification
- Kingdom: Plantae
- Clade: Embryophytes
- Clade: Tracheophytes
- Clade: Angiosperms
- Clade: Monocots
- Clade: Commelinids
- Order: Arecales
- Family: Arecaceae
- Genus: Syagrus
- Species: S. macrocarpa

Binomial name
- Syagrus macrocarpa Barb.Rodr. [1879]

Synonyms
- Cocos macrocarpa (Barb.Rodr.) Barb.Rodr. [1882]; Cocos getuliana Bondar [1941]; Barbosa getuliana (Bondar) A.D.Hawkes [1952]; Syagrus getuliana (Bondar) Glassman [1963]; Cocos procopiana Glaz. ex Drude [1881]; Calappa procopiana (Glaz. ex Drude) Kuntze [1891]

= Syagrus macrocarpa =

Species of palm

Syagrus macrocarpa is a rare species of palm found only as scattered isolated individuals and small groups in the east of the Brazilian states of Espírito Santo, Minas Gerais and Rio de Janeiro. It grows to 4-10m tall, with 8-20 leaves to 2m long. The leaves are bent at the end, with very hairy margins near the trunk, and consist of 180-320 slightly coiled leaflets irregularly arranged in several planes on the rake. The fruit are oval, greenish-yellow, 6–9 cm long. It is grown in cultivation. Seeds are difficult to germinate, with low rates of germination. Common names for it in Minas Gerais are baba-de-boi-grande and maria-rosa.

== Taxonomy ==
Unlike most other species of Syagrus, this species started in 1879 as a Syagrus, as João Barbosa Rodrigues classified it along with Karl von Martius' S. cocoides. Three years later Rodrigues synonymised the genus Syagrus with Cocos (it was resurrected in 1916 by Beccari).

== Description ==
It is quite similar to Syagrus romanzoffiana, but differs by being smaller, with smaller leaves and inflorescence, but with much larger fruit and female flowers. Unlike the spiral placement of the racemes (branches) of the inflorescence in S. romanzoffiana, S. macrocarpa has its racemes unilaterally arranged. S. cocoides also is similar but has smaller fruit and spirally placed racemes in the inflorescence.

Noblick, writing for the IUCN in 1998, mentions his concern that the scattered nature of the population might harm the species in the long term due to inbreeding.
