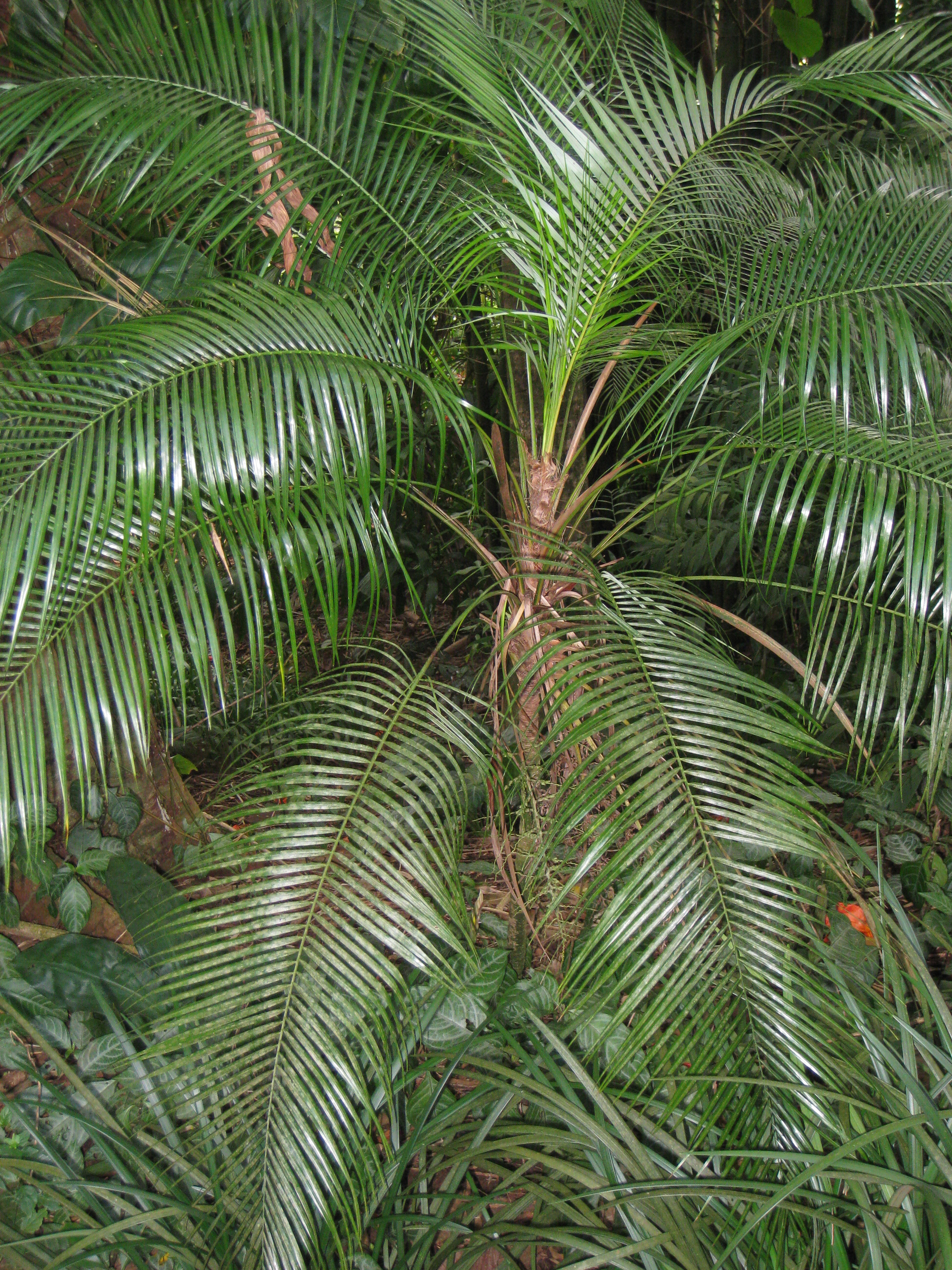

Scientific classification
- Kingdom: Plantae
- Clade: Tracheophytes
- Clade: Angiosperms
- Clade: Monocots
- Clade: Commelinids
- Order: Arecales
- Family: Arecaceae
- Subtribe: Attaleinae
- Genus: Syagrus
- Species: S. weddelliana

Binomial name
- Syagrus weddelliana (H.Wendl.) Becc.

Synonyms
- Cocos weddelliana H.Wendl; Lytocaryum weddellianum (H.Wendl.) Toledo; Microcoelum weddellianum (H.Wendl.) H.E.Moore; Glaziova elegantissima H.Wendl.; Cocos elegantissima (H.Wendl.) Schaedtler; Glaziova martiana Glaz. ex Drude; Calappa elegantina Kuntze; Microcoelum martianum (Glaz. ex Drude) Burret & Potztal

= Syagrus weddelliana =

Species of palm

Syagrus weddelliana, also known as the miniature coconut palm or Weddell's palm, is a feather palm in the palm family.

== Description ==
The palm has a small stature, only growing to a height of 6 feet (1.8 m). In rare cases, this palm can grow to 10 feet (3.0 m), with a trunk diameter of about 3 1/2 inches (9 cm). After flowering, it produces small edible fruits that resemble and taste like coconuts.

== Distribution and habitat ==
This palm is native to the State of Rio de Janeiro in southeastern Brazil. It grows naturally in the rainforests of the region. It is a medium altitude palm, growing in altitudes of 50–800 m (160–2,620 ft). It thrives in the humid shade of the Brazilian rainforests.

== Taxonomy ==
Originally, the palm was placed in the same genus as the coconut palm, under the name Cocos weddelliana, before moving to the queen palm genus, Syagrus, and then to Lytocaryum. Based on morphological and molecular evidence, Larry Noblick and Alan Meerow subsumed Lytocaryum back into Syagrus in 2015.

== Horticulture ==
It is closely related to the coconut palm, but is much smaller and more cold tolerant, taking down to about 25 °F (−4 °C). This palm can be successfully grown in hardiness zones 10b–11. It has been reported that oil extracted from the nuts has been important commercially. This palm should be grown in well draining soil that is constantly moist, but not soggy, as this can lead to lethal root rot.
