= Syagrus stratincola =

Conservation status
- Vulnerable (IUCN 2.3)

Scientific classification
- Kingdom: Plantae
- Clade: Tracheophytes
- Clade: Angiosperms
- Clade: Monocots
- Clade: Commelinids
- Order: Arecales
- Family: Arecaceae
- Genus: Syagrus
- Species: S. stratincola

Binomial name
- Syagrus stratincola Wess. Boer

Species of palm

Syagrus stratincola is a species of flowering plant in the family Arecaceae. It is found in French Guiana, Guyana, and Suriname. It is threatened by habitat loss.
