= Syagrus rupicola =

Scientific classification
- Kingdom: Plantae
- Clade: Tracheophytes
- Clade: Angiosperms
- Clade: Monocots
- Clade: Commelinids
- Order: Arecales
- Family: Arecaceae
- Genus: Syagrus
- Species: S. rupicola

Binomial name
- Syagrus rupicola Noblick & Lorenzi, 2004

Species of palm

Syagrus rupicola is a short species belonging to the palm family (Arecaceae), found only in Brazil, and was first described by Larry Noblick and Harri Lorenzi in 2010.

== Description ==
The height of a mature Syagrus rupicola ranges from 4-6 ft and it appears to be stemless. As it matures, to a height of approximately 1 meter, its short underground stem spans 10-20 centimeters. It possesses large pistillate flowers, and its fruits split at the apex. A perpendicular bract, fibrous and fleshy mesocarp, as well as silvery-blue leaves are some defining characteristics of Syagrus rupicola. The leaves of this species has a leathery texture The leaves are approximately 1 meter long and arched with a 3-6 inch crown. They are grouped into clusters of 2-5 and appear to be angled at different positions along the stem. The stalk that bears the plant's fruit grows to be 30-40 centimeters long. Syagrus rupicola has a woody perpendicular bract. This species can be referred to as "sawtooth", "fox llicuri", or "palm of stone." This palm has a light frost tolerance, and grows at a slow, steady rate.

== Etymology ==
The species name "rupicola" translates to "rock-dweller" in English.

== Distribution ==
Syagrus rupicola is native to the Chapada dos Veadeiros region in the state of Goias, Brazil. It is known to favor high-altitude terrains of over 1,000 meters. This palm species generally grows optimally in well-drained, rocky soil types.

== Ideal growth conditions ==
From an early age, S. rupicola requires a lot of sun to grow. It has a high wind tolerance, making it capable of growing in conditions with high disturbance. S. rupicola grows in light shade in dry, hot climates; it requires moderate amounts of water for growth.

== Uses/cultivation ==
Serves as a food source for small animals and humans. This species is used for its seeds, landscaping, and for ornamental purposes. The perpendicular bract of this species is used in many handicrafts.

== Properties ==
This species possesses male and female reproductive organs, making it a monoecious evergreen species.

== See also ==
- Syagrus (plant)
