= Syagrus smithii =

Conservation status
- Least Concern (IUCN 3.1)

Scientific classification
- Kingdom: Plantae
- Clade: Tracheophytes
- Clade: Angiosperms
- Clade: Monocots
- Clade: Commelinids
- Order: Arecales
- Family: Arecaceae
- Genus: Syagrus
- Species: S. smithii

Binomial name
- Syagrus smithii (H.E.Moore) Glassman

Synonyms
- Homotypic Synonyms: Chrysallidosperma smithii H.E.Moore

Species of palm

Syagrus smithii is a species of flowering plant in the palm family, Arecaceae. It is native to Brazil, Colombia, Ecuador and Peru.

== Distribution and habitat ==
It has been observed growing on hills in wet, lowland forests at elevations lower than 1,000 metres (3,280 ft).

== Reproductive biology ==
It has been reported to be pollinated by Mystrops beetles and may be dispersed by vertebrates. Flowering and fruiting have been reported in April and September.
