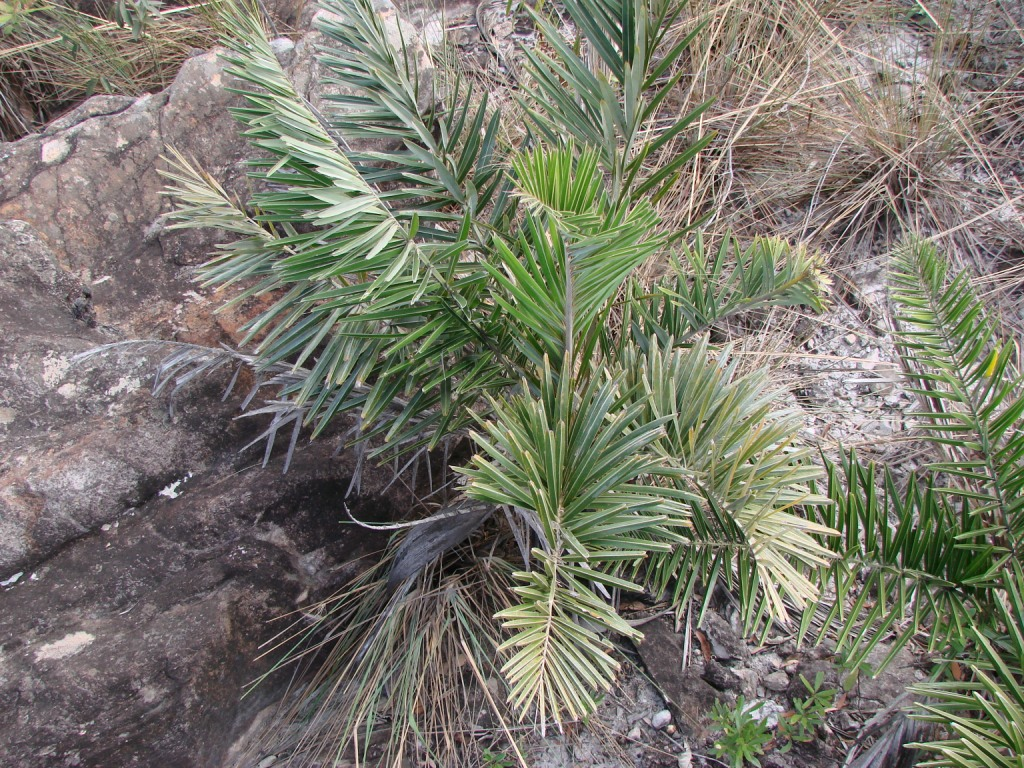

Conservation status
- Vulnerable (IUCN 2.3)

Scientific classification
- Kingdom: Plantae
- Clade: Tracheophytes
- Clade: Angiosperms
- Clade: Monocots
- Clade: Commelinids
- Order: Arecales
- Family: Arecaceae
- Genus: Syagrus
- Species: S. glaucescens

Binomial name
- Syagrus glaucescens Glaziou ex Becc.

= Syagrus glaucescens =

Species of palm

Syagrus glaucescens is a species of flowering plant in the family Arecaceae. It is endemic to Minas Gerais state in southeastern Brazil. Its small population is threatened by collecting and habitat destruction.
