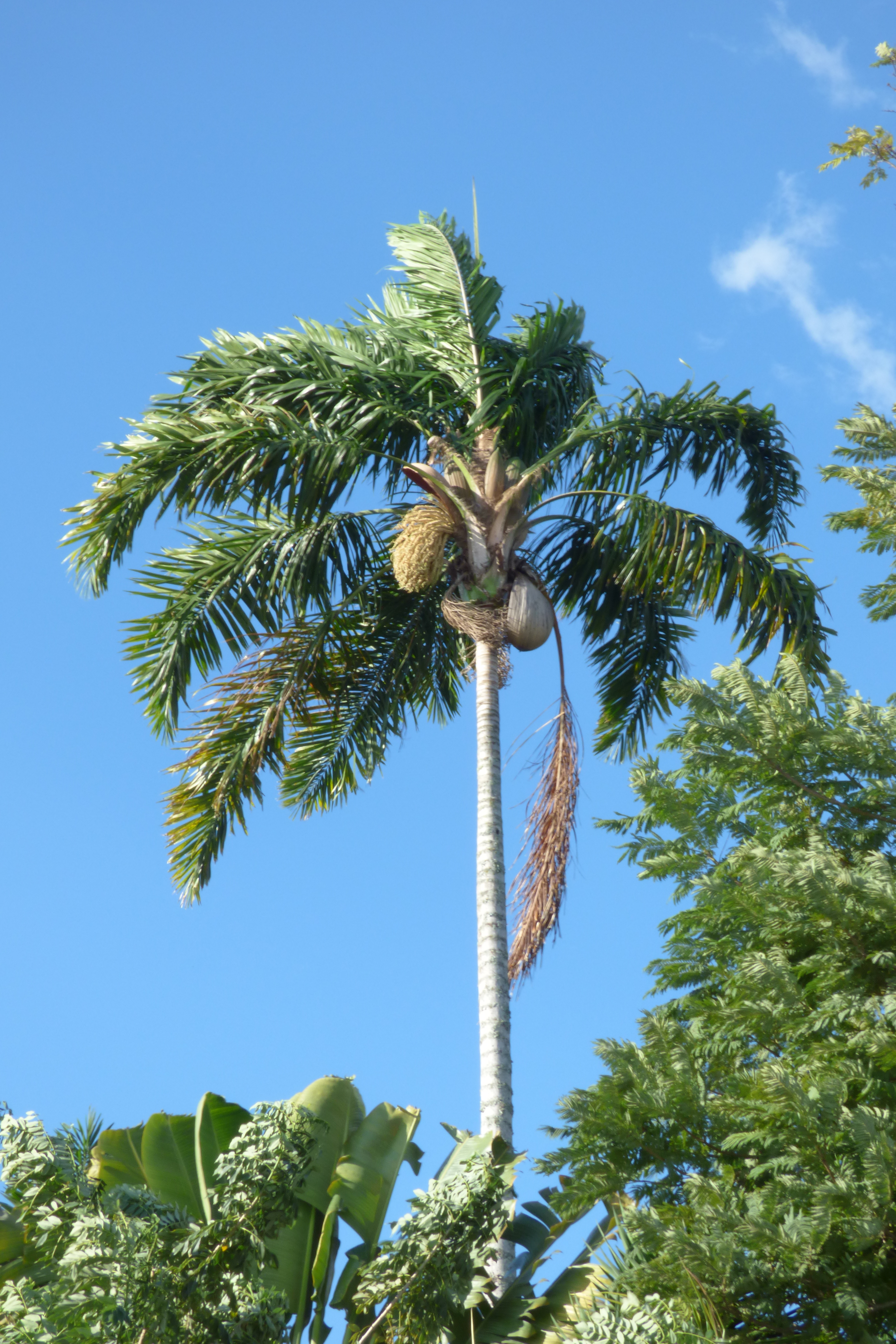

Scientific classification
- Kingdom: Plantae
- Clade: Tracheophytes
- Clade: Angiosperms
- Clade: Monocots
- Clade: Commelinids
- Order: Arecales
- Family: Arecaceae
- Genus: Syagrus
- Species: S. sancona

Binomial name
- Syagrus sancona H.Karst.

Synonyms
- Butia argentea (Engel) Nehrl.; Calappa sancona (Kunth) Kuntze; Cocos argentea Engel; Cocos chiragua (H.Karst.) Becc.; Cocos sancona (Kunth) Hook.f.; Oenocarpus sancona (Kunth) Spreng.; Oreodoxa sancona Kunth; Palma sancona (Kunth) Kunth; Platenia chiragua H.Karst.; Syagrus argentea (Engel) Becc.; Syagrus chiragua (H.Karst.) H.Wendl.; Syagrus ecuadorensis Becc.; Syagrus tessmannii Burret

= Syagrus sancona =

Species of palm

Syagrus sancona is a species of palm tree native to Bolivia, Venezuela, Colombia, Ecuador and Peru.

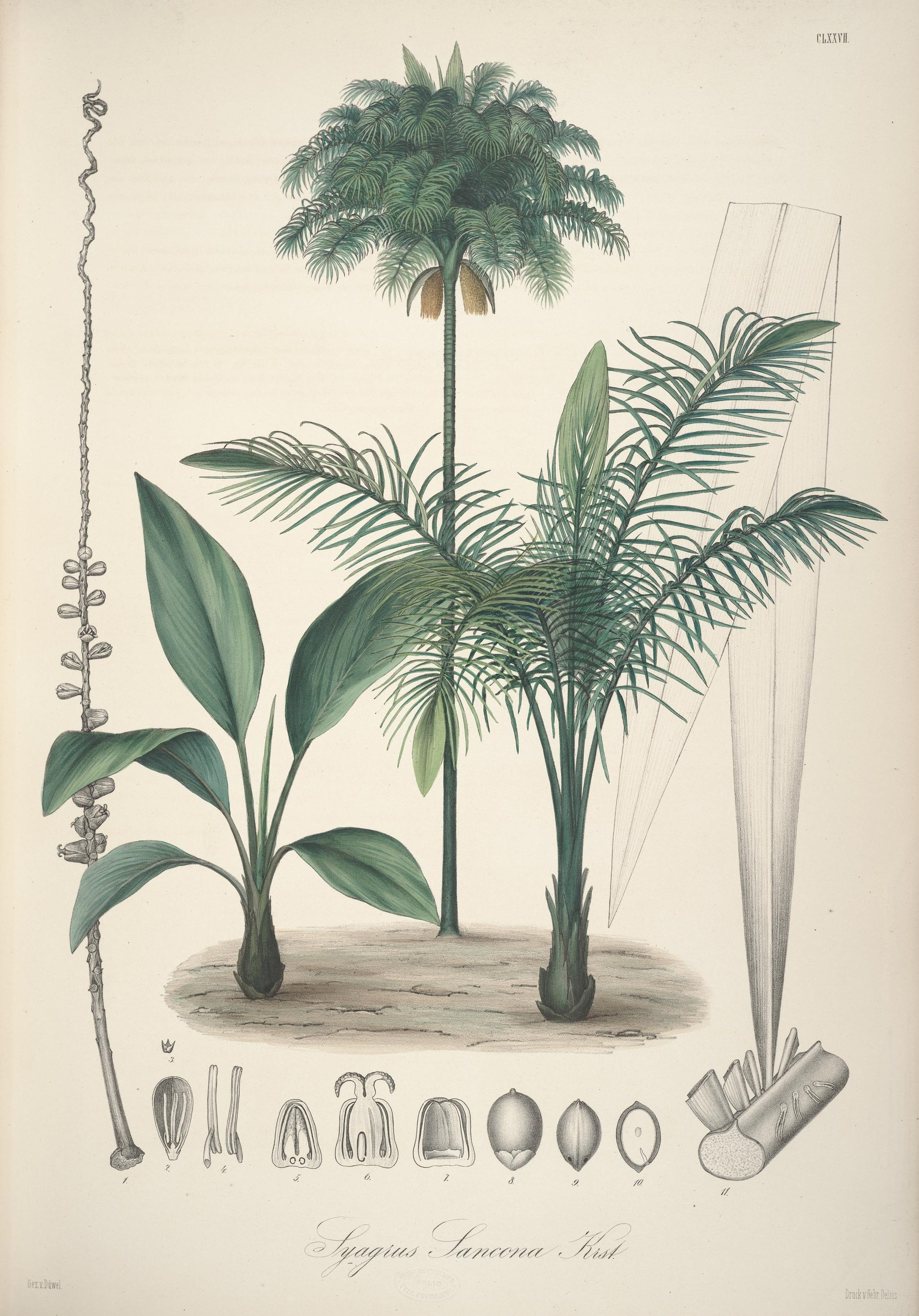
Pl. CLXXVII Florae Columbiae.
