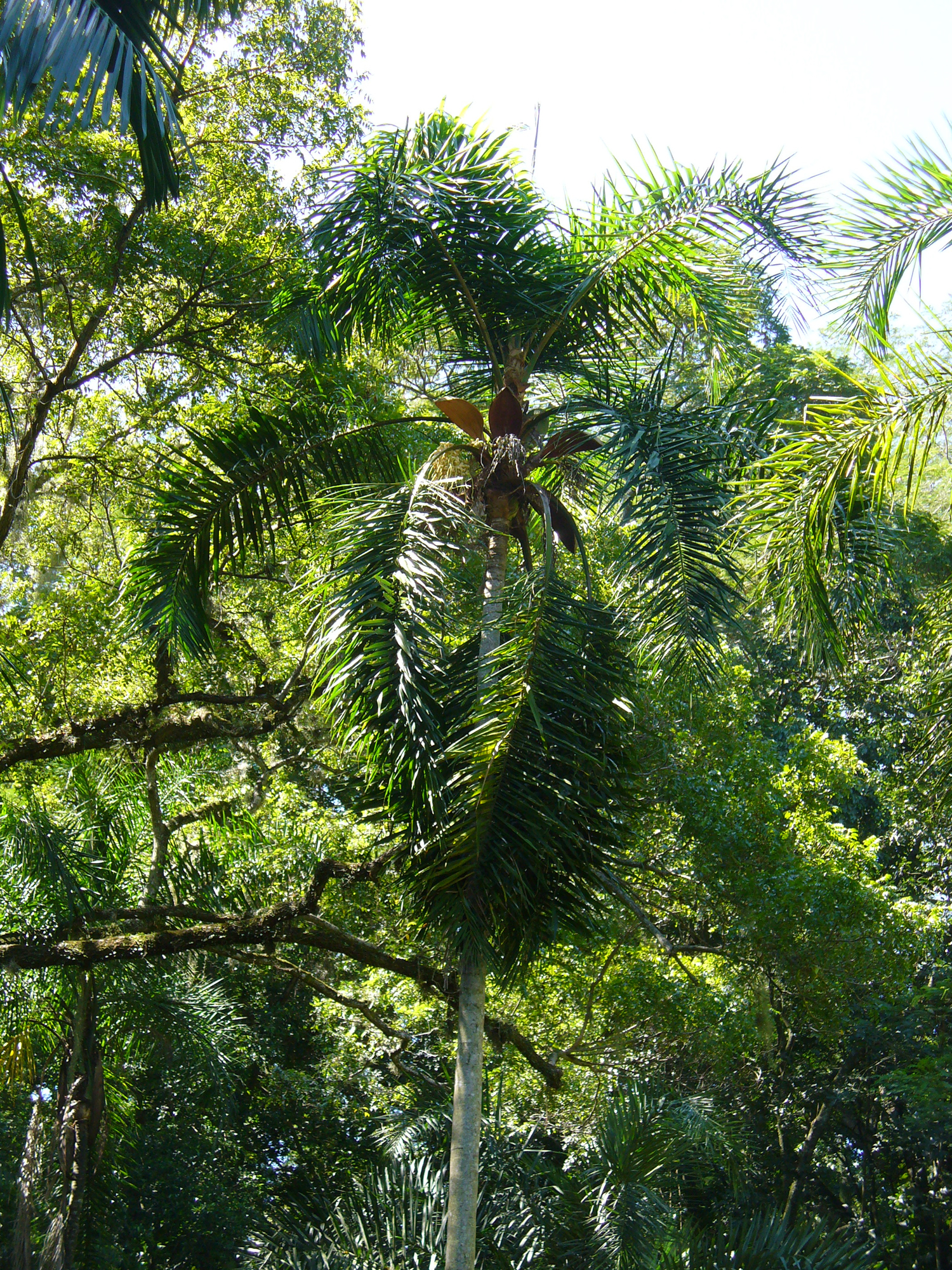

Conservation status
- Least Concern (IUCN 2.3)

Scientific classification
- Kingdom: Plantae
- Clade: Tracheophytes
- Clade: Angiosperms
- Clade: Monocots
- Clade: Commelinids
- Order: Arecales
- Family: Arecaceae
- Genus: Syagrus
- Species: S. pseudococos

Binomial name
- Syagrus pseudococos (Raddi) Glassman

Synonyms
- Langsdorffia pseudococos Raddi; Barbosa pseudococos (Raddi) Becc.; Cocos mikaniana Mart.; Syagrus mikaniana (Mart.) Mart.; Calappa mikaniana (Mart.) Kuntze

= Syagrus pseudococos =

Species of palm

Syagrus pseudococos is a species of flowering plant in the family Arecaceae. It is found in tropical rainforest and on rocky outcrops in eastern Brazil along a coastal strip from extreme south of state of Bahia south through Espírito Santo, Rio de Janeiro to São Paulo.

Syagrus pseudococos has a single, thin, greenish trunk which grows over 50 feet (15 meters) high. It produces quite large fruit and has a full crown. It grows best in rich, well drained soil. It can be distinguished from other species of Syagrus by the pear-shaped form of the fruit. The seeds are also unique among Syagrus in having a hollow interior to the endosperm, just like a coconut.

It is possibly known as coco verde in California, whereas in Brazil it is known as coco-amargoso or peririma.
