= Syagrus ruschiana =

Conservation status
- Least Concern (IUCN 2.3)

Scientific classification
- Kingdom: Plantae
- Clade: Tracheophytes
- Clade: Angiosperms
- Clade: Monocots
- Clade: Commelinids
- Order: Arecales
- Family: Arecaceae
- Genus: Syagrus
- Species: S. ruschiana

Binomial name
- Syagrus ruschiana (Bondar) Glassman

Species of palm

Syagrus ruschiana is a species of flowering plant in the family Arecaceae. It is found only in Brazil.
