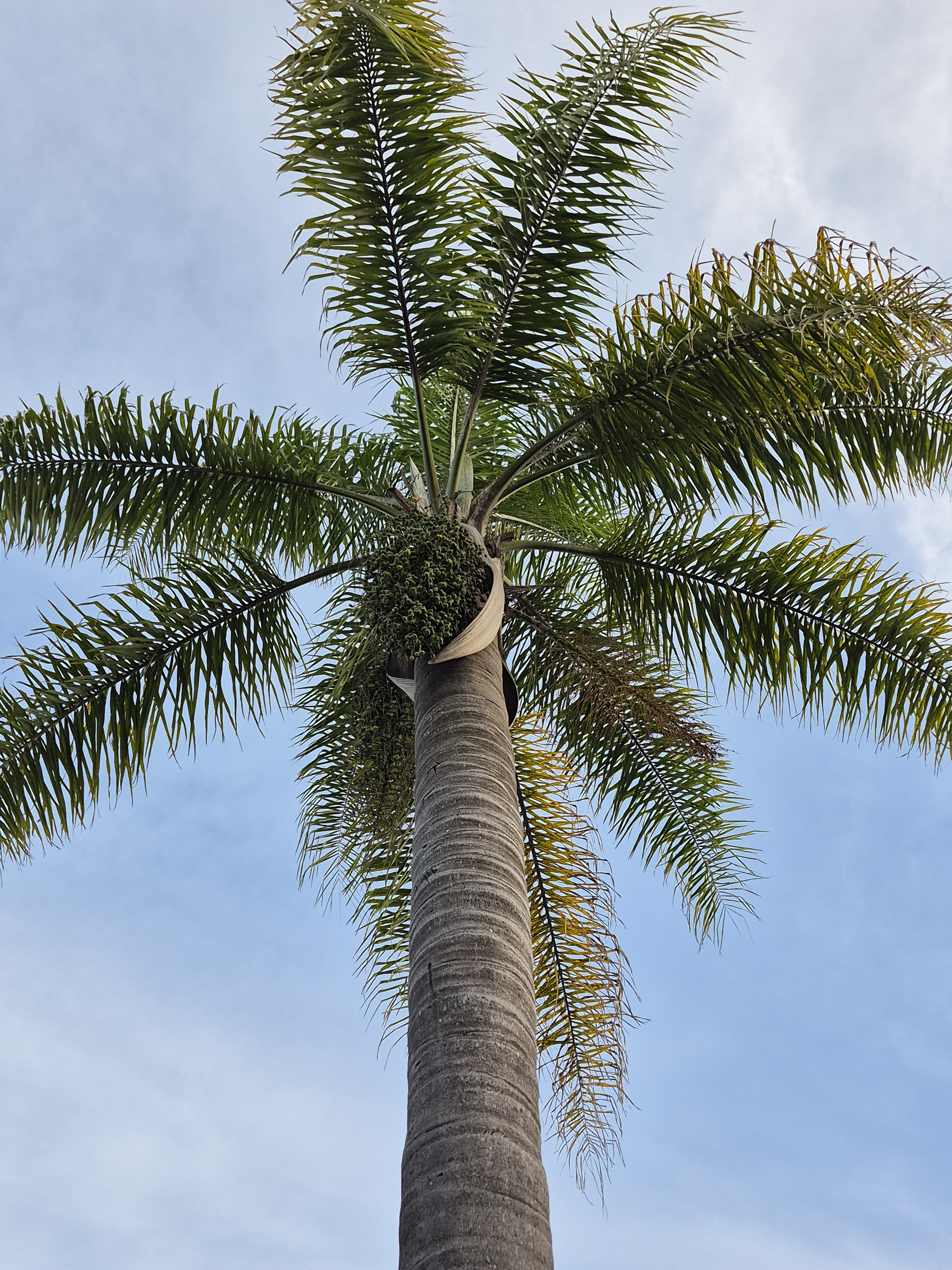
- In Brazil
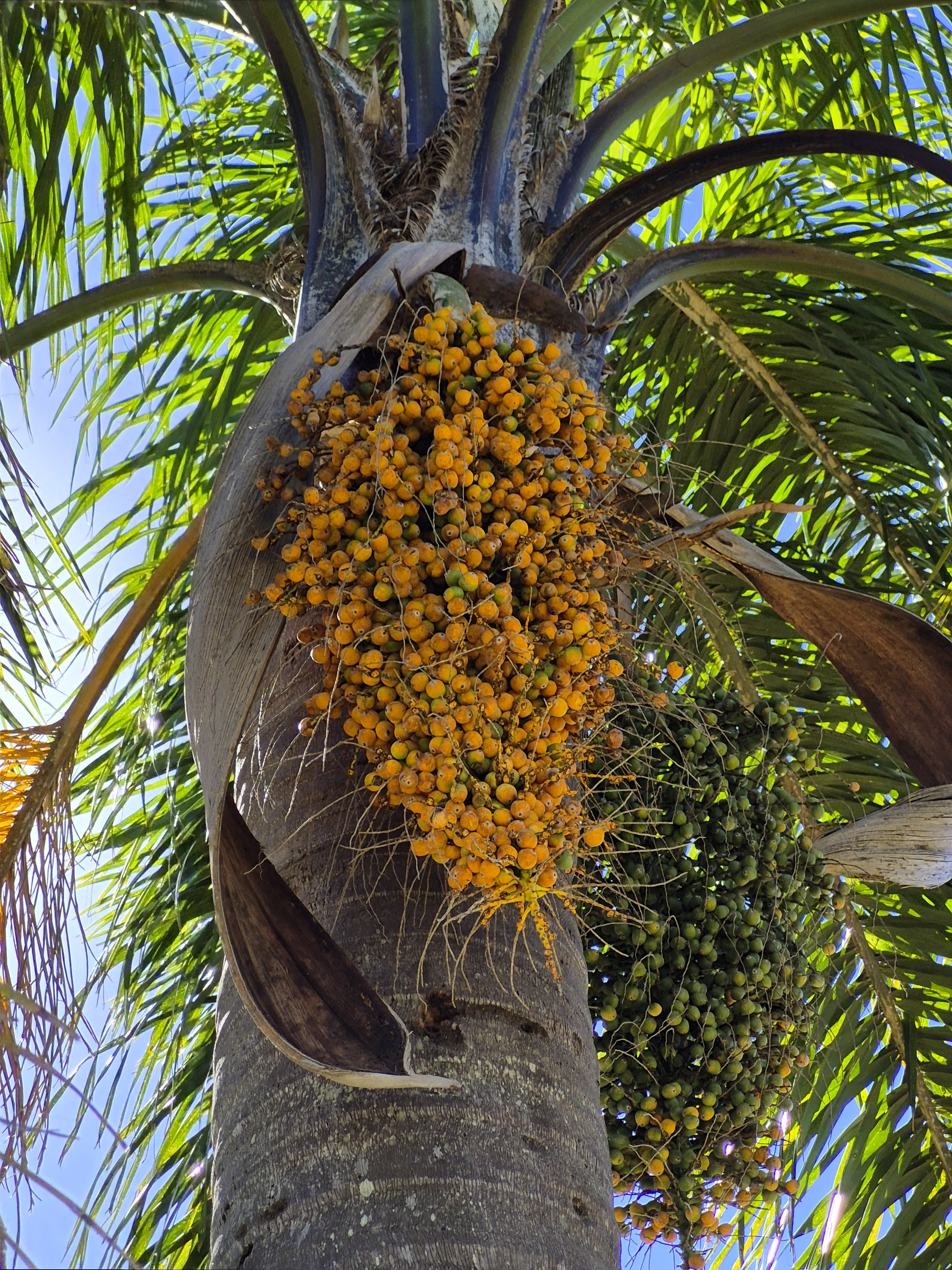
- Fruits

Conservation status
- Least Concern (IUCN 3.1)

Scientific classification
- Kingdom: Plantae
- Clade: Tracheophytes
- Clade: Angiosperms
- Clade: Monocots
- Clade: Commelinids
- Order: Arecales
- Family: Arecaceae
- Genus: Syagrus
- Species: S. romanzoffiana

Binomial name
- Syagrus romanzoffiana (Cham.) Glassman [1968]

Synonyms
- Cocos romanzoffiana Cham. [1822]; Calappa romanzoffiana (Cham.) Kuntze [1891]; Arecastrum romanzoffianum (Cham.) Becc. [1916]; Arecastrum romanzoffianum var. australe (Mart.) Becc. [1916]; Arecastrum romanzoffianum var. ensifolium (Drude) Becc. [1916]; Arecastrum romanzoffianum var. genuinum Becc. [1916]; Arecastrum romanzoffianum var. genuinum subvar. minus Becc. [1916]; Arecastrum romanzoffianum var. micropindo Becc. [1916]; Cocos australis Mart. [1844]; Cocos plumosa Hook.f. [1860]; Cocos datil Drude & Griseb. [1879]; Cocos geriba Barb.Rodr. [1879]; Cocos acrocomioides Drude [1881]; Cocos botryophora Mart. var. ensifolia Drude [1881]; Cocos martiana Drude & Glaz [1881]; Calappa acrocomioides (Drude) Kuntze [1891]; Calappa australis (Mart.) Kuntze [1891]; Calappa datil (Drude & Griseb.) Kuntze [1891]; Calappa martiana (Drude & Glaz.) Kuntze [1891]; Calappa plumosa (Hook.f.) Kuntze [1891]; Cocos sapida Barb.Rodr. [1899]; Cocos arechavaletana Barb.Rodr. [1901]; Cocos romanzoffiana var. plumosa (Hook.f.) A.Berger [1912]; Syagrus sapida (Barb.Rodr.) Becc. [1916]

= Syagrus romanzoffiana =

Queen palm

Species of palm

Syagrus romanzoffiana, the queen palm, cocos palm or Jerivá, is a palm native to South America, introduced throughout the world as a popular ornamental garden tree. S. romanzoffiana is a medium-sized palm, quickly reaching maturity at a height of up to 15 m (49 ft) tall, with pinnate leaves having as many as 494 pinnae (leaflets), although more typically around 300, each pinna being around 50 centimetres (18 in) in length and 3–5 centimetres (1–2 in) in width.

== Etymology ==
Named after Nikolay Rumyantsev (1754–1826), who was Russia's Foreign Minister and Imperial Chancellor and notable patron of the Russian voyages of exploration. He sponsored the first Russian circumnavigation of the globe.

It was previously scientifically known as Cocos plumosa, a name under which it became popular in the horticultural trade in the early 20th century. In some areas of the world the plant is still popularly known as the cocos palm.

== Taxonomy ==
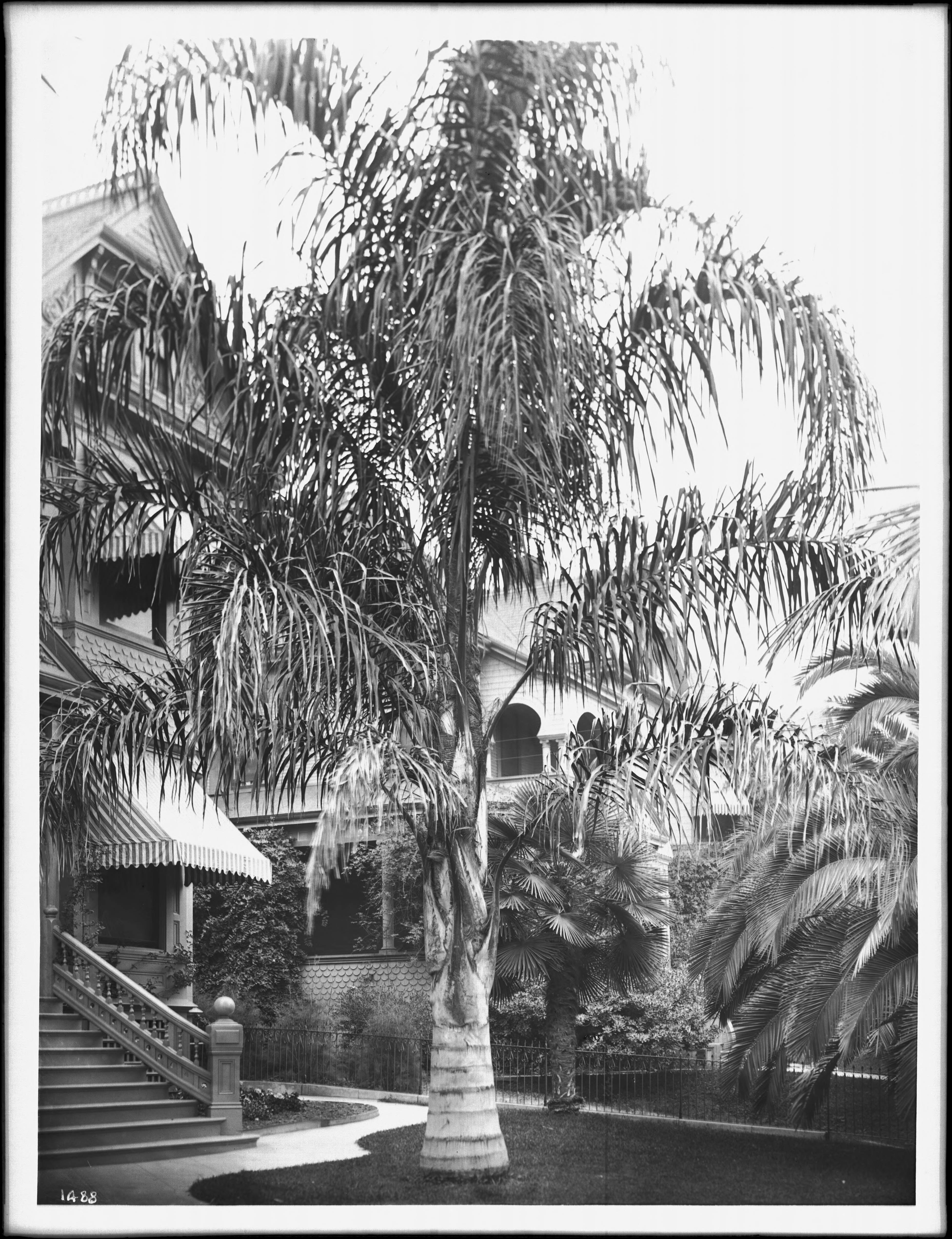
A 'Cocos plumosos' palm tree growing in a lawn in front of a residence in Los Angeles, California in 1920.

This palm was first scientifically described and validly published as Cocos romanzoffiana in 1822 in Paris in a folio of illustrations made by the artist Louis Choris, with a description by the French-German poet and botanist Adelbert von Chamisso. Both men had participated in the first Russian scientific expedition around the world under command of Otto von Kotzebue, and funded by Nikolay Rumyantsev, during which they collected this plant in the hinterland of Santa Catarina, Brazil in late 1815.

Meanwhile, in England, circa 1825, Loddiges nursery had imported seed of a palm from Brazil which they dubbed Cocos plumosa in their catalogue, a nomen nudum. The horticulturist John Claudius Loudon in 1830 listed this plant among 3 species of the Cocos genus then grown in Britain, and mentioned its possible identification as Karl von Martius' C. comosa. One of Loddiges' seedlings found its way to the new palm stove built at Kew Gardens in the 1840s, where it had grown to a height of 50–60 ft, and where botanists determined it to be another of von Martius' species; C. coronata. In 1859 this palm flowered and produced fruit for the first time, which made it clear that its previous identification was incorrect and thus the director of the garden, Joseph Dalton Hooker, 'reluctantly' published a valid description for Loddiges' name C. plumosa in 1860. C. plumosa became a popular ornamental plant around the world, and plants continued to be sold under this name as of 2000.

From 1887 onwards Odoardo Beccari published a review of the genus Cocos. Under subgenus Arecastrum he listed the taxa C. romanzoffiana of Santa Catarina, C. plumosa known only from cultivation from seedlings from the plant in Kew, C. australis of Argentina to Paraguay, C. datil of eastern Argentina and Uruguay, C. acrocomioides of Mato Grosso do Sul, C. acaulis of Piauí, Goiás and recently collected from the mountains of Paraguay bordering Brazil, and C. geriba (syn. C. martiana) known as a variable species cultivated in gardens throughout Brazil (Rio Grande do Sul, Minas Gerais, Paraná, Rio de Janeiro) and the Mediterranean region. Beccari noted that many of the palms being offered in the catalogues under various species names were actually C. geriba.

In 1912 Alwin Berger reduced the taxon C. plumosa, hitherto still only known from thousands in cultivation around the world yet not known from the wild, to a variety of C. romanzoffiana, as C. romanzoffiana var. plumosa.

It was first moved from the genus Cocos in 1891 by Otto Kuntze in his Revisio Generum Plantarum, which was widely ignored, but in 1916 Beccari raised Arecastrum to a monotypic genus and synonymised all species in the former subgenus to A. romanzoffianum. By this time South American imports of palm seed were being sold across Europe under a plethora of names, according to Beccari often mislabelled but impossible to determine down to 'correct' geographical species, thus he interpreted the taxa to belong to a single extremely variable species. This interpretation was long followed. Beccari also considered C. botryophora part of this species, an interpretation that is now partially rejected. Beccari recognised the following, now rejected, varieties:

- Arecastrum romanzoffianum var. australe – from C. australis, C. datil
- Arecastrum romanzoffianum var. botryophora – from C. botryophora. As this taxon Beccari (mis)identified plants growing in Rio de Janeiro he earlier considered C. geriba. Synonymy later rejected.
- Arecastrum romanzoffianum var. ensifolium – from C. botryophora var. ensifolium of Bahia.
- Arecastrum romanzoffianum var. genuinum – nominate form. Includes C. romanzoffiana, C. plumosa, C. geriba, C. martiana.
- Arecastrum romanzoffianum var. genuinum subvar. minus – from a dwarf individual plant of uncertain origins in cultivation in a private collection in Hyères, France.
- Arecastrum romanzoffianum var. micropindo – from a population of dwarf plants from Paraguay earlier misidentified as C. acaulis.

Beccari also reinstated Martius' Syagrus.

Arecastrum was subsumed under Syagrus in 1968.

A genetics study by Bee F. Gunn found that S. romanzoffiana did not group with the other two Syagrus species tested, but with Lytocaryum weddellianum. If this has merit, then L. weddelianum, being the junior taxon, becomes Arecastrum weddelianum.

== Distribution ==
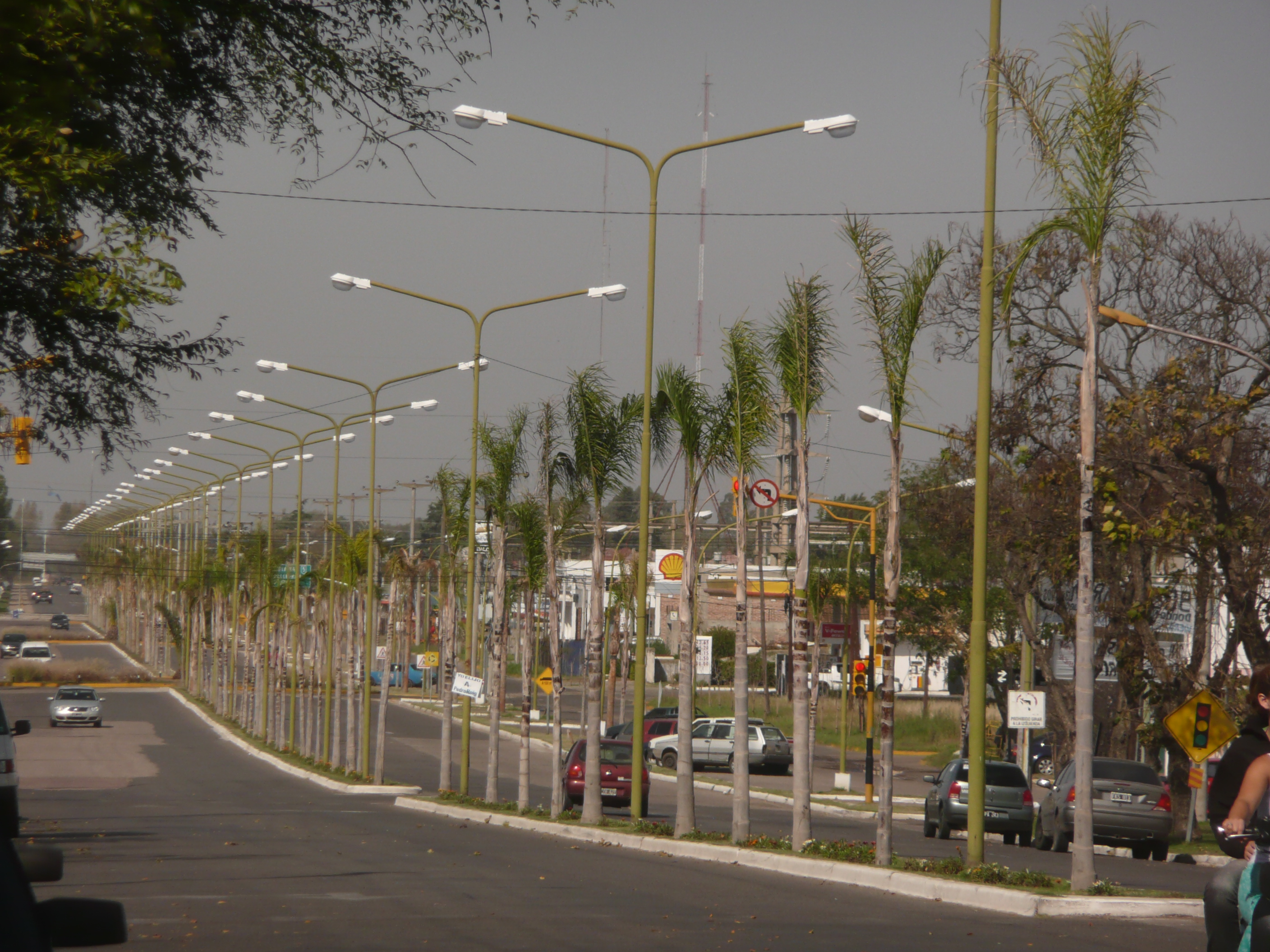
Syagrus romanzoffiana can grow in tough urban conditions. This picture is of the city of Trenque Lauquen, Argentina.

It occurs from eastern and central Paraguay and northern Argentina north to eastern and southern Brazil and northern Uruguay. It is also native to Bolivia. It is quite common in its native range.

In Brazil it occurs in the states of Bahia, Distrito Federal, Goiás, Mato Grosso do Sul, Espírito Santo, Minas Gerais, Rio de Janeiro, São Paulo, Paraná, Rio Grande do Sul and Santa Catarina. In Argentina it occurs in the provinces of Buenos Aires, Chaco, Corrientes, Entre Ríos, Formosa, Mendoza, Misiones (El Dorado, Guaraní, Iguazú), Santa Fe, San Juan and San Luis. In Uruguay it occurs in the departments of Maldonado, Montevideo, Rivera, Rocha, Salto, Tacuarembó and Treinta y Tres. In Paraguay it occurs in the departments of Alto Paraná, Amambay, Caaguazú, Canindeyú, Central, Concepción, Cordillera, Guairá, Ñeembucú, Paraguarí and San Pedro.

=== Non-native distribution ===
The queen palm is reportedly naturalized to some extent in Florida, Queensland, Australia, Honduras, and the island of Mauritius.

On Mauritius seedlings have been recorded from gardens in the now highly residential area 'Montagne Ory' near the village of Moka from 1981–1984 to at least 1999.

The government of the Australian state of Queensland considers it a potential 'invasive plant', and discourages home-owners from planting it, but it is not prohibited or restricted, or a declared weed. According to the 1989 Flora of Southeastern Queensland, it is naturalised in southern Queensland and the Atherton Tableland.

It is not regarded as an invasive or naturalised in New South Wales, although numerous sightings of it have been recorded around Sydney and the coast, including in nature parks. It has been classified as a noxious weed by one local council in New South Wales since at least 2010; as of 2015 it is not prohibited or restricted in the state, but classified as a 'serious threat ... not widely distributed in the area in one local region. It was possibly first identified as a potential environmental weed for the area in a book from 1998. Sale is discouraged and the palms are being removed.

It is widely planted throughout much of Florida and other parts of the southern United States, although it is not yet widely established in the flora as of 2000.

It can also be found in some parts of the Mediterranean basin.

== Ecology ==
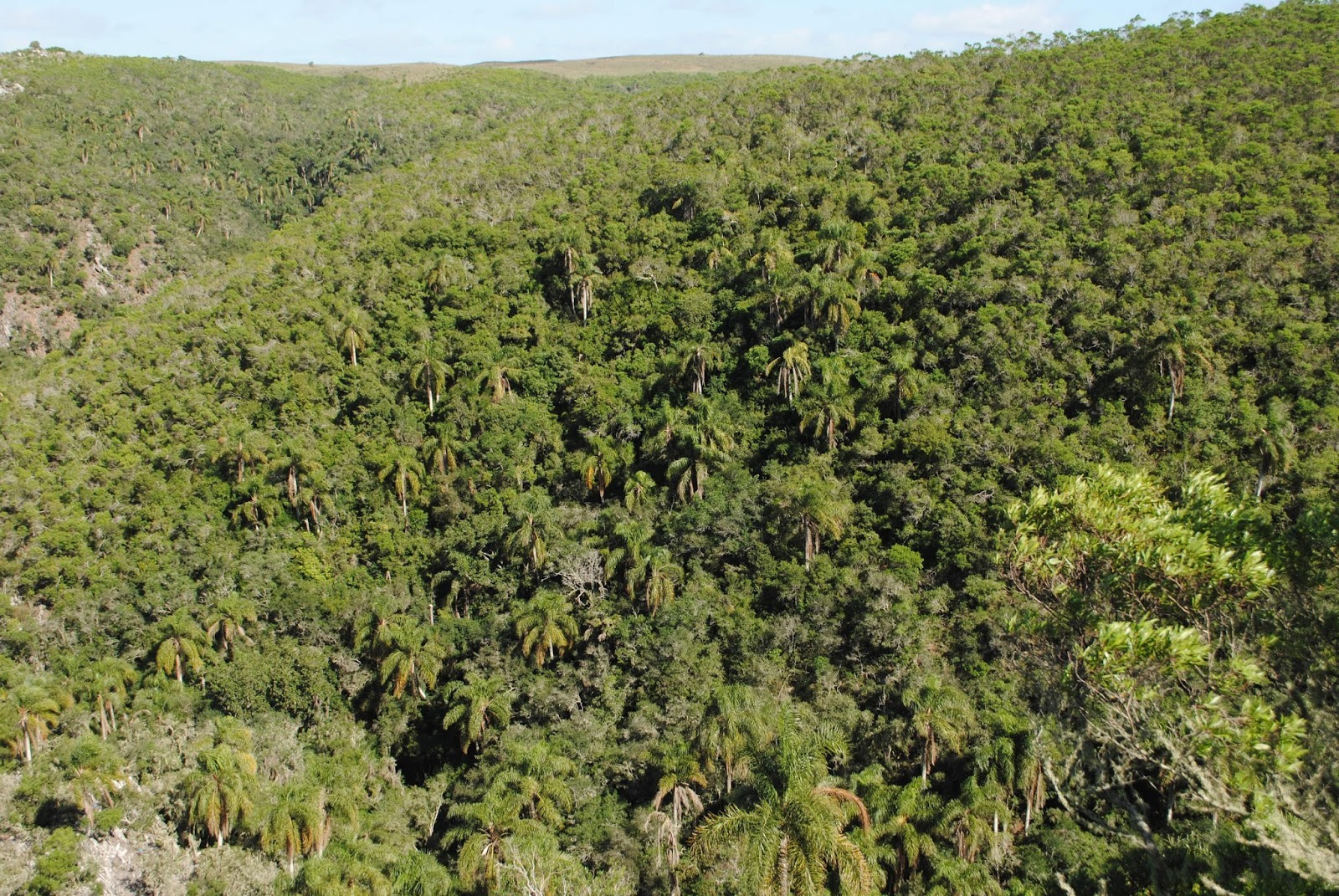
Syagrus romanzoffiana growing in the wild in Bosque de Quebrada, Uruguay.

It is a common tree in many habitats.

Birds are recorded to eat the fruit pulp from fallen fruit include the rufous-bellied thrush (Turdus rufiventris), the bananaquit (Coereba flaveola), violaceous euphonia (Euphonia violacea), Brazilian tanager (Ramphocelus bresilius) and tropical parula (Parula pitiayumi). Azure jays (Cyanocorax caeruleus) feed on the fruit pulp both picked directly from the infructescence as well as from fallen fruit lying on the ground, usually swallowing the fruits whole or transporting them away from the tree. The two toucans Ramphastos vitellinus and R. dicolorus pluck ripe fruits directly from the infructescence and regurgitate the seeds, the gamefowl chachalaca Ortalis guttata (or a closely related species, depending on one's taxonomic interpretation) and the two related guan Penelope obscura and P. superciliaris, did so as well, but spread the seeds in their defecations and thus may be important dispersers.

The squirrel Guerlinguetus brasiliensis ssp. ingrami is an important seed predator of this palm where the ranges of the two species overlap; breaking the nut open with its teeth at one of the three pores in the top of the nutshell. It preferentially targets bug-infested nuts. A long term study into feeding behaviour of this squirrel in a secondary Araucaria forest found that although in certain seasons other plants were consumed in larger quantities, the palm nuts were eaten in large quantities throughout the entire year and were thus the most important food item.

Other important seed predators are seed-boring weevils and palm bruchid beetles of the genus Pachymerus. Grubs of P. bactris, P. cardo and P. nucleorum have all been found within the seed of this species (among many other species of related South American palms). The large, colourful weevil Revena rubiginosa appears to be the main seed predator in numerous areas. It is thought to probably be a specialist seed predator of this palm. It infests the developing seeds before the fruits are ripe, while they are still attached to the infructescence, the grubs exiting the seed to pupate underground around the palm when the fruit fall. Other weevils found to be seed predators of this palm are Anchylorhynchus aegrotus and A. variabilis, but these species are also flower visitors and likely important specialized pollinators.

The fruit are eaten by tapirs, which might be important seed dispersers, and some wild canids such as the pampas fox and the crab-eating fox.

Three studies in Brazil, in four locations lacking other large frugivores such as squirrels, peccaries, deer and tapirs, found coati (Nasua nasua) to be important seed dispersers in such areas. The coati climb into the palm to get at the fruit, which in one urban study was found in 10% of all stool samples, although it constituted only 2.5% of the total faecal matter. Other important dispersing mammals were agoutis (Dasyprocta azarae), which sometimes cache seeds. Black-eared opossum (Didelphis aurita) and a russet rice rat (Euryoryzomys russatus) were also found among the fallen fruits.

The leaves of this palm are consumed by the caterpillars of the butterflies Blepolenis batea in Uruguay in 1974, Brassolis astyra ssp. astyra, B. sophorae and Catoblepia amphirhoe in Santa Catarina in 1968, while Opsiphanes invirae, the nominate form or possibly subspecies remoliatus, was recorded feeding on this palm in both these regions. O. quiteria was also recorded feeding on the leaves in Argentina in 1969.

Larvae of the giant day-flying moth Paysandisia archon are known to attack the piths of this palm species, along with many other species, at least in Europe, where neither the moth nor the palm are native. It can kill the palm. It prefers other genera of palm with more hairy trunks like Trachycarpus, Trithrinax or Chamaerops.

The caterpillars of the Indonesian butterfly Cephrenes augiades ssp. augiades and the Australian C. trichopepla may also feed on the leaves of this palm.

The bases of the pruned fronds remain on the tree for several months and could serve as a habitat for insects or snails.

== Cultivation and uses ==
The queen palm is planted in many tropical and subtropical areas. It is popular as an ornamental tree and much used in urban landscaping. It is hardy, to -5 °C (zone 9a), but the dead fronds must be pruned to keep the tree visually pleasing. In some areas the fallen fruit are known for attracting unwelcome insects.

The palm is often cut down in Brazil to use the leaves and inflorescences to provide animal (cattle) fodder, especially in times of drought. The leaves are similarly used in Argentina. Its fruits are edible and sometimes eaten; consisting of a hard nut surrounded with a thin layer of fibrous flesh that is orange and sticky when ripe. The flavour is sweet and could be described as a mixture of plum and banana.

According to Blombery & Rodd [1982] people eat the unexpanded leaves of apical buds in some regions. Fallen fruits are fed to pigs, and palm trunks are often used in construction, frequently hollowed out to make water pipes or aqueducts for irrigation. In 1920s Argentina, it was cultivated as a crop. The young buds are consumed as vegetables, pickled or preserved in oil. The trunk of the palm provides sago.

== Gallery ==
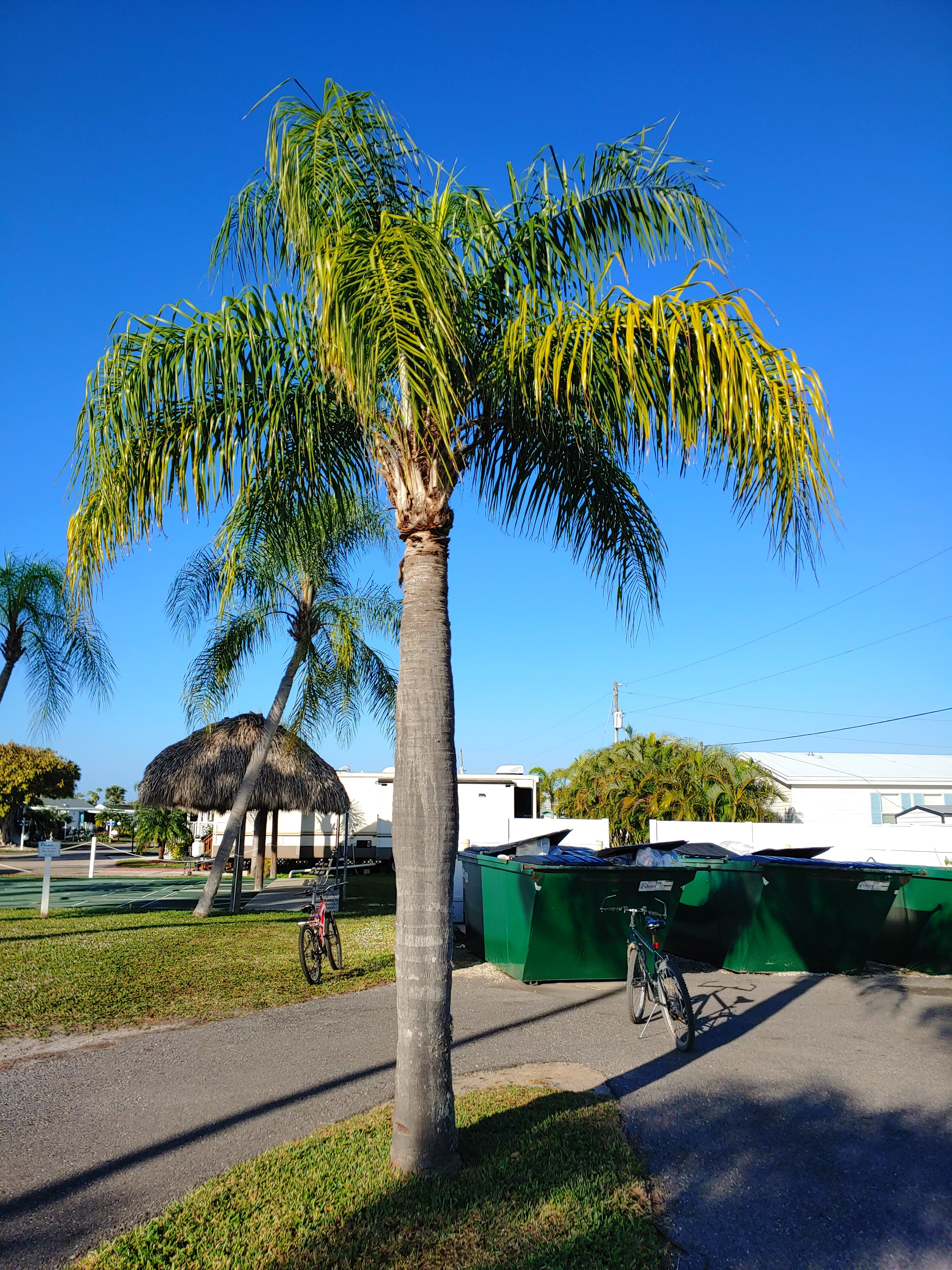
Syagrus romanzoffiana growing in Central Florida

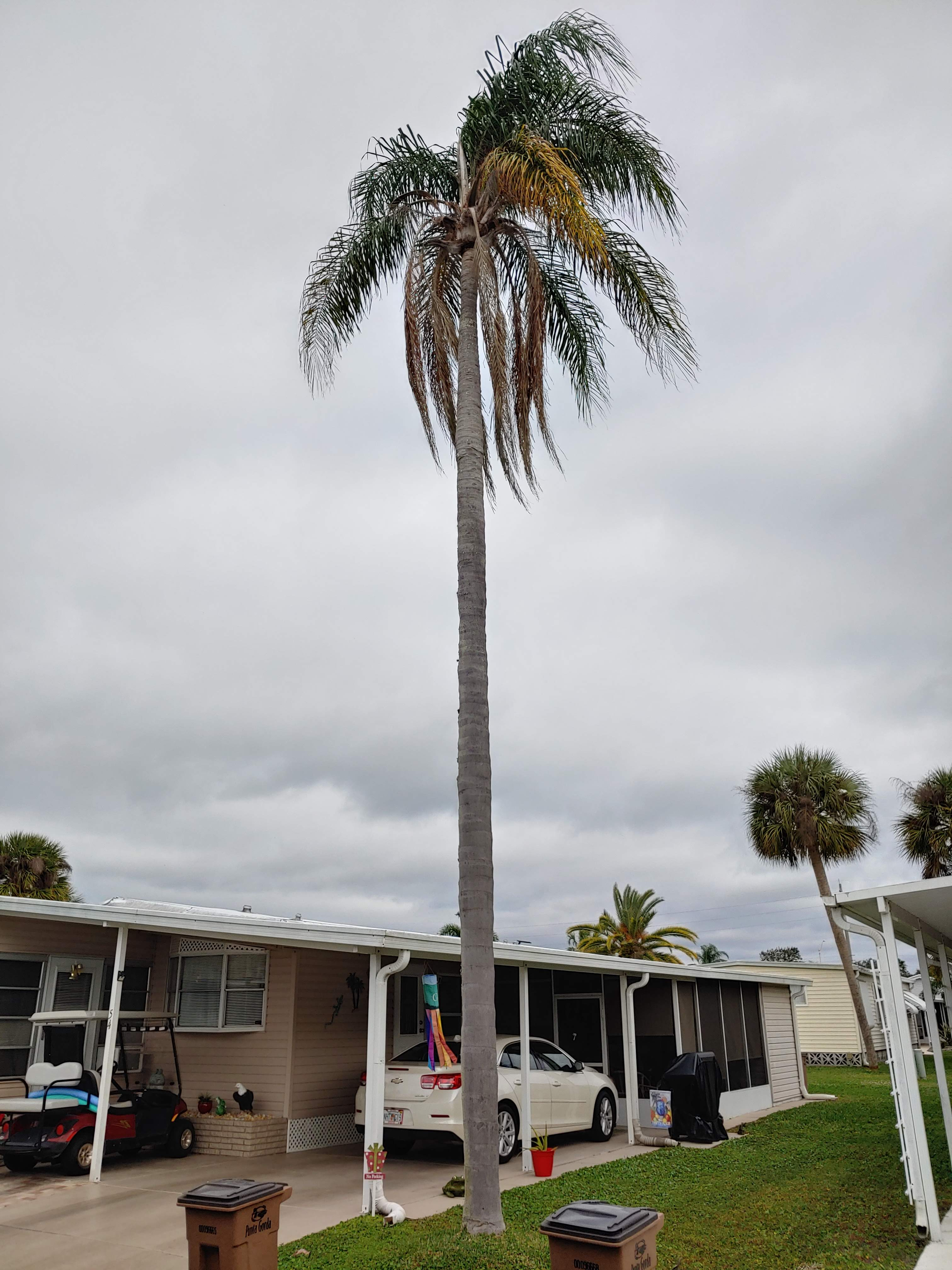
Old palm in Punta Gorda, Florida

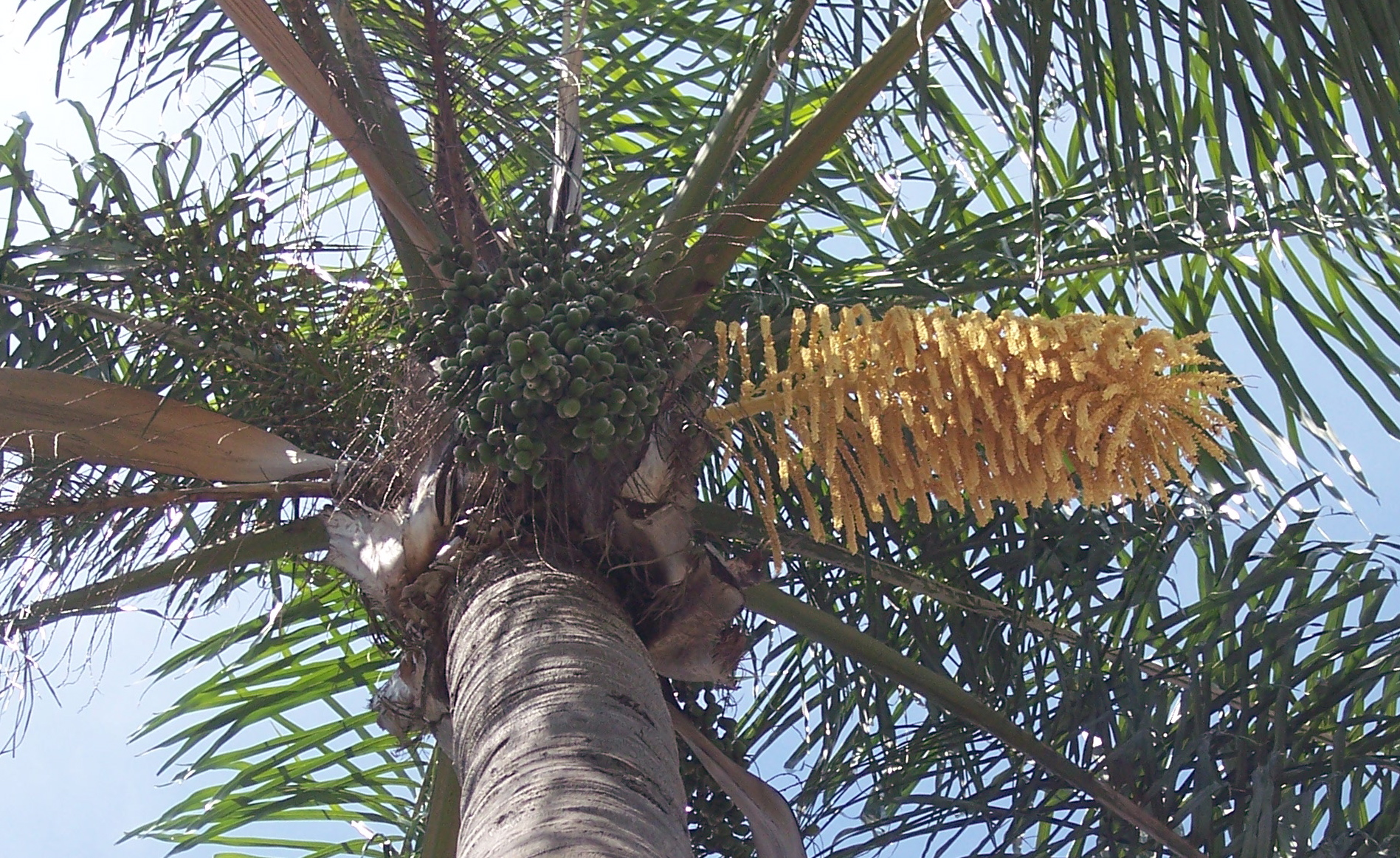
Inflorescence

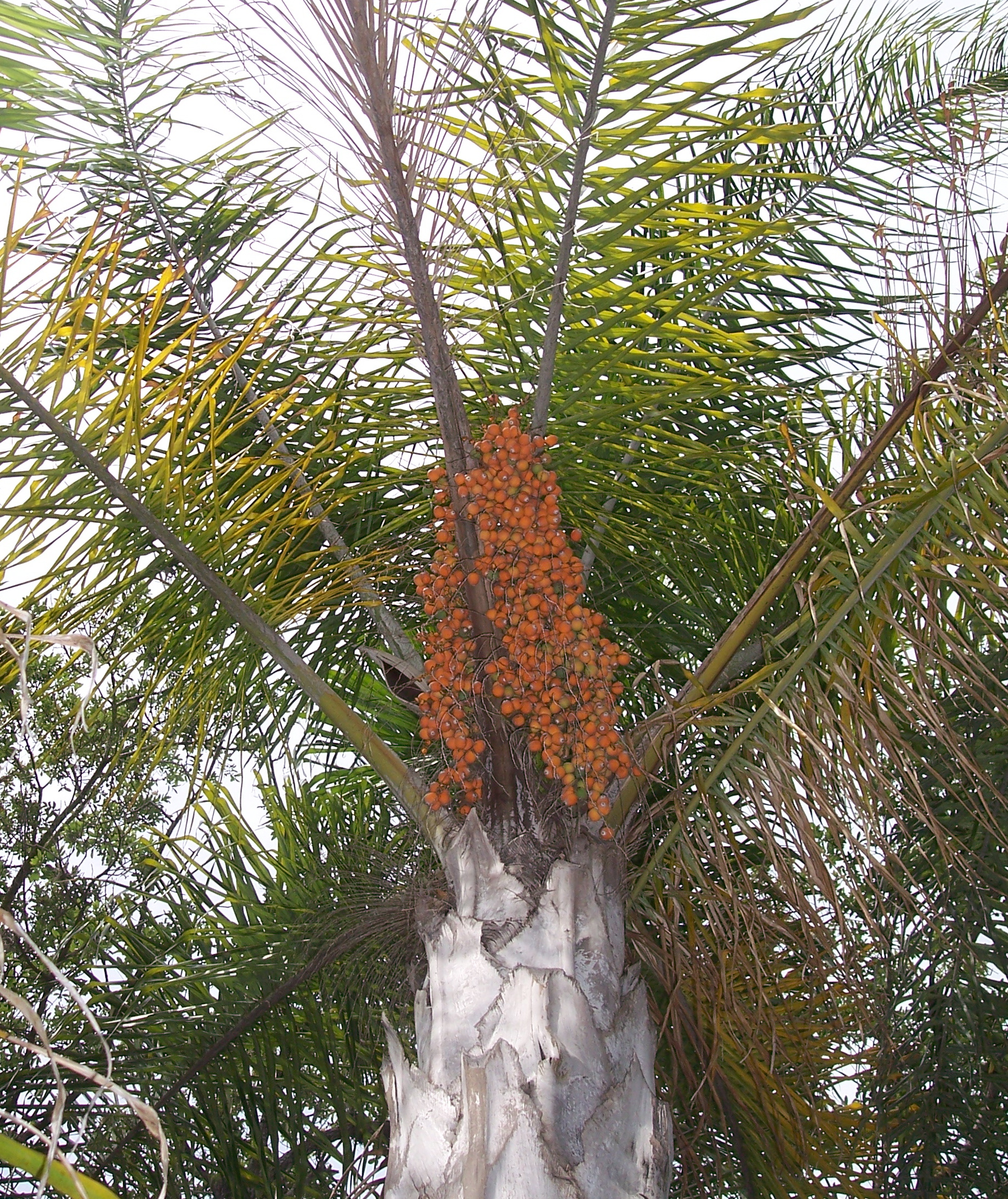
Ripe fruit

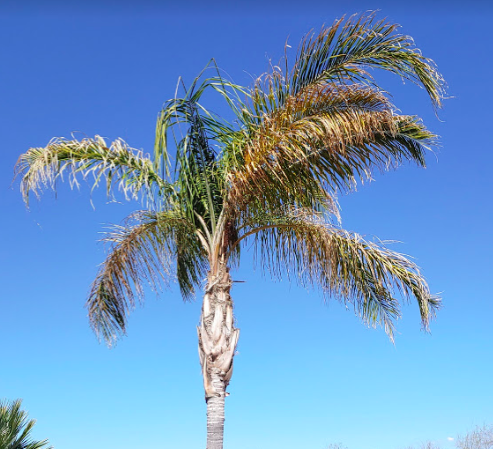
Queen palm in Phoenix, Arizona, showing sunburned fronds, a common issue with them in hot desert climates

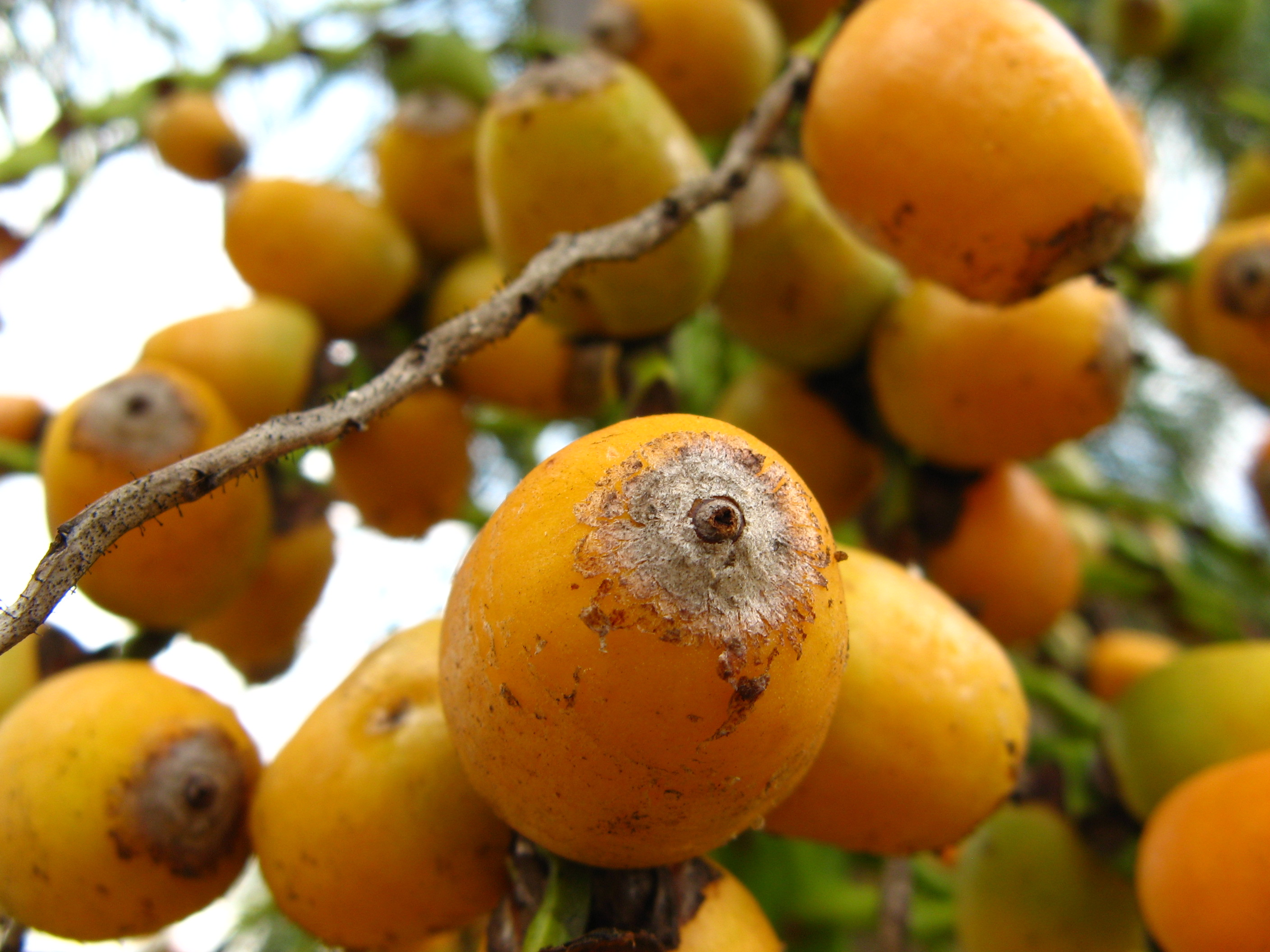

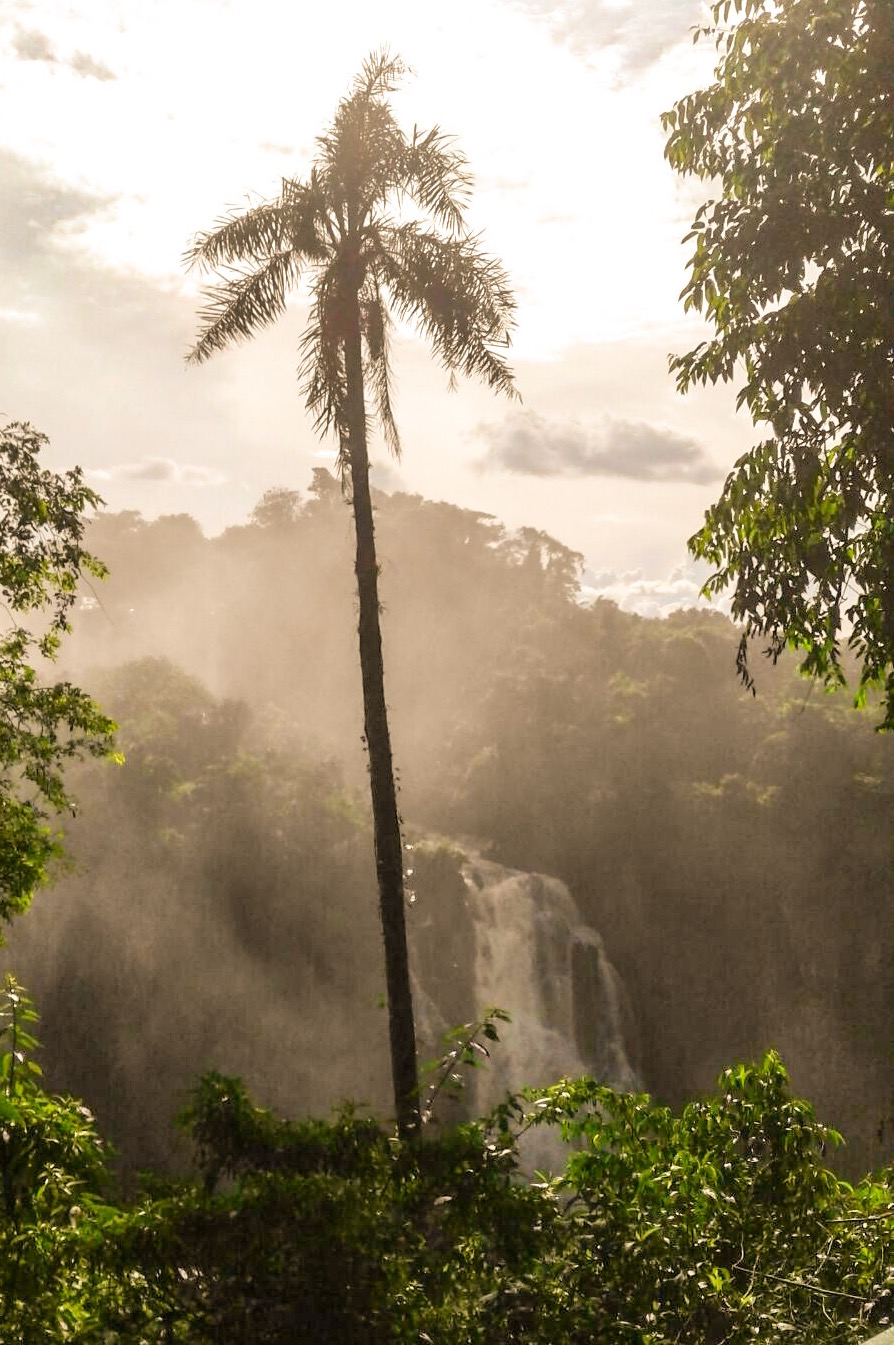
Syagrus romanzoffiana growing near the Iguaçu Falls

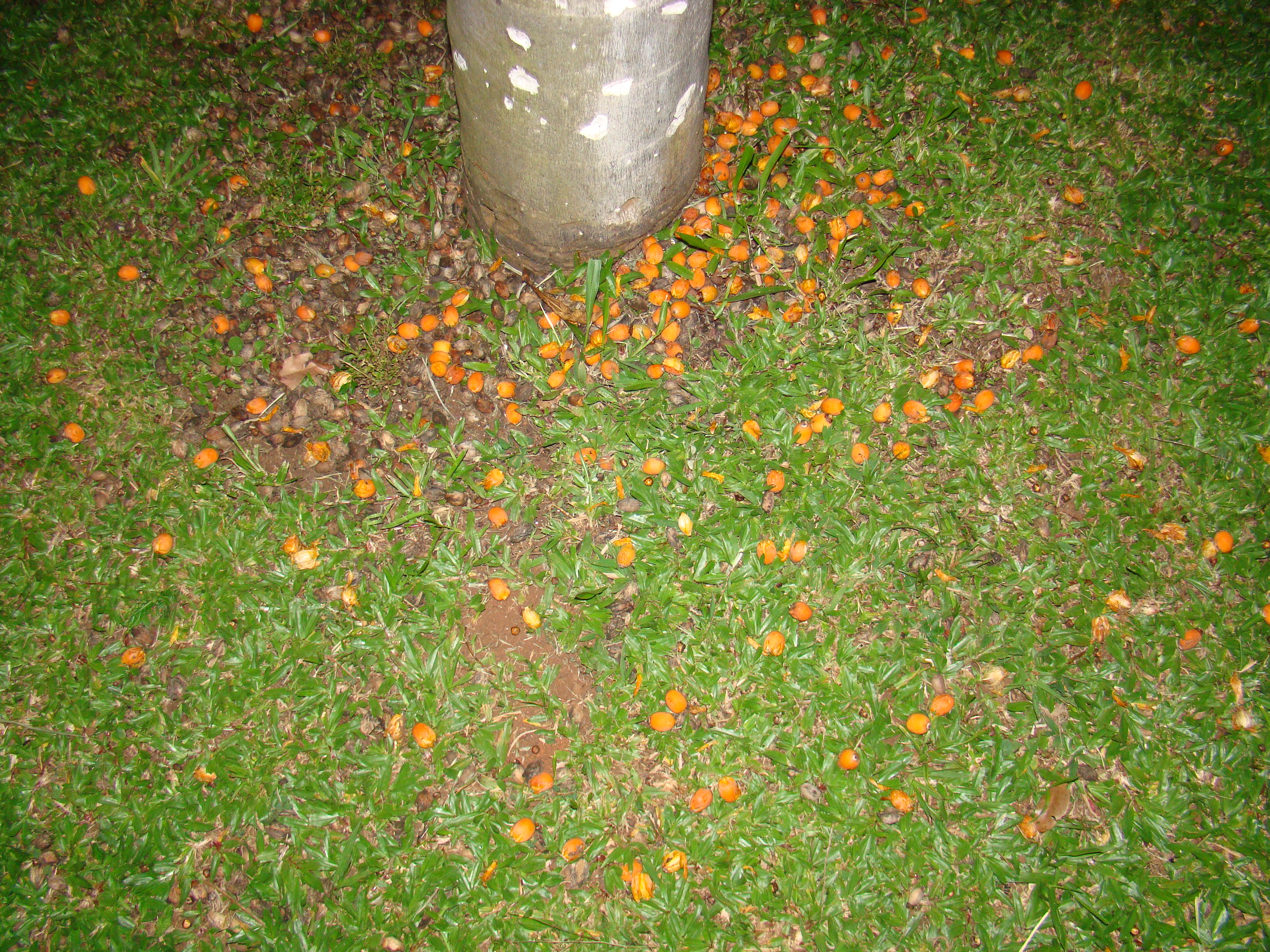
Fruiting palm in a city park in São Paulo, Brazil

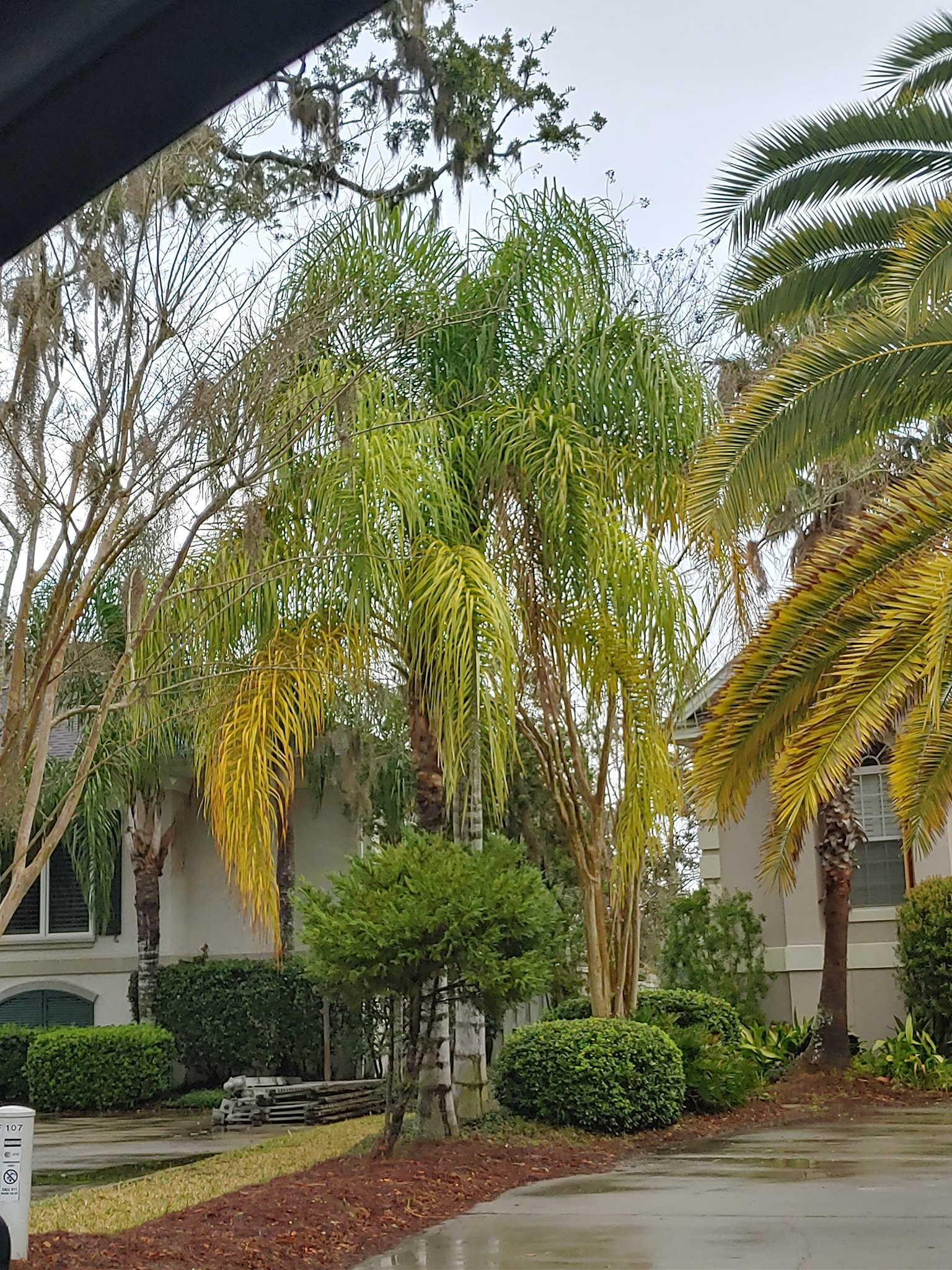
Syagrus romanzoffiana growing in coastal Georgia, USA

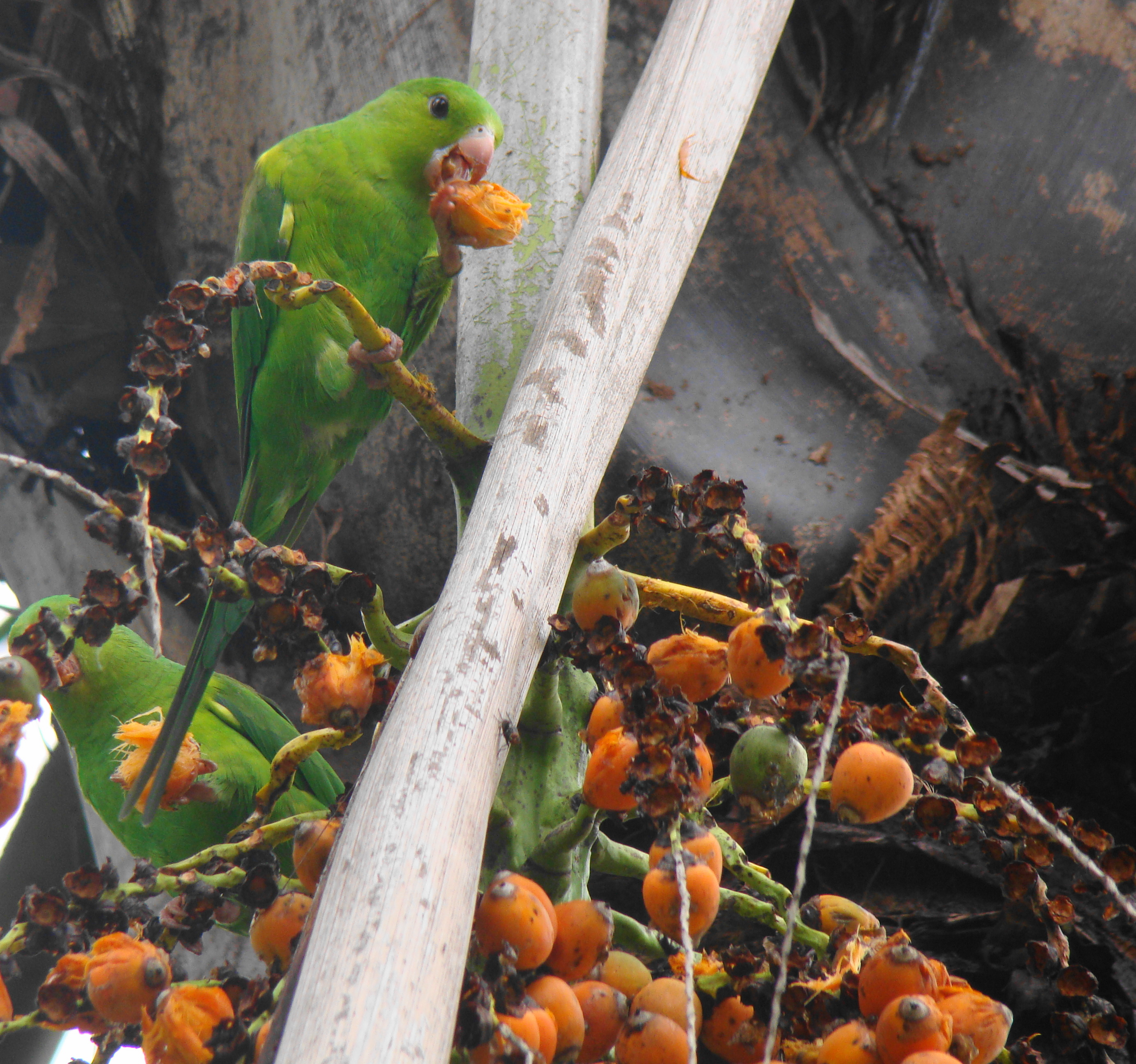
Brotogeris chiriri feeding on Syagrus romanzoffiana in São Paulo.
