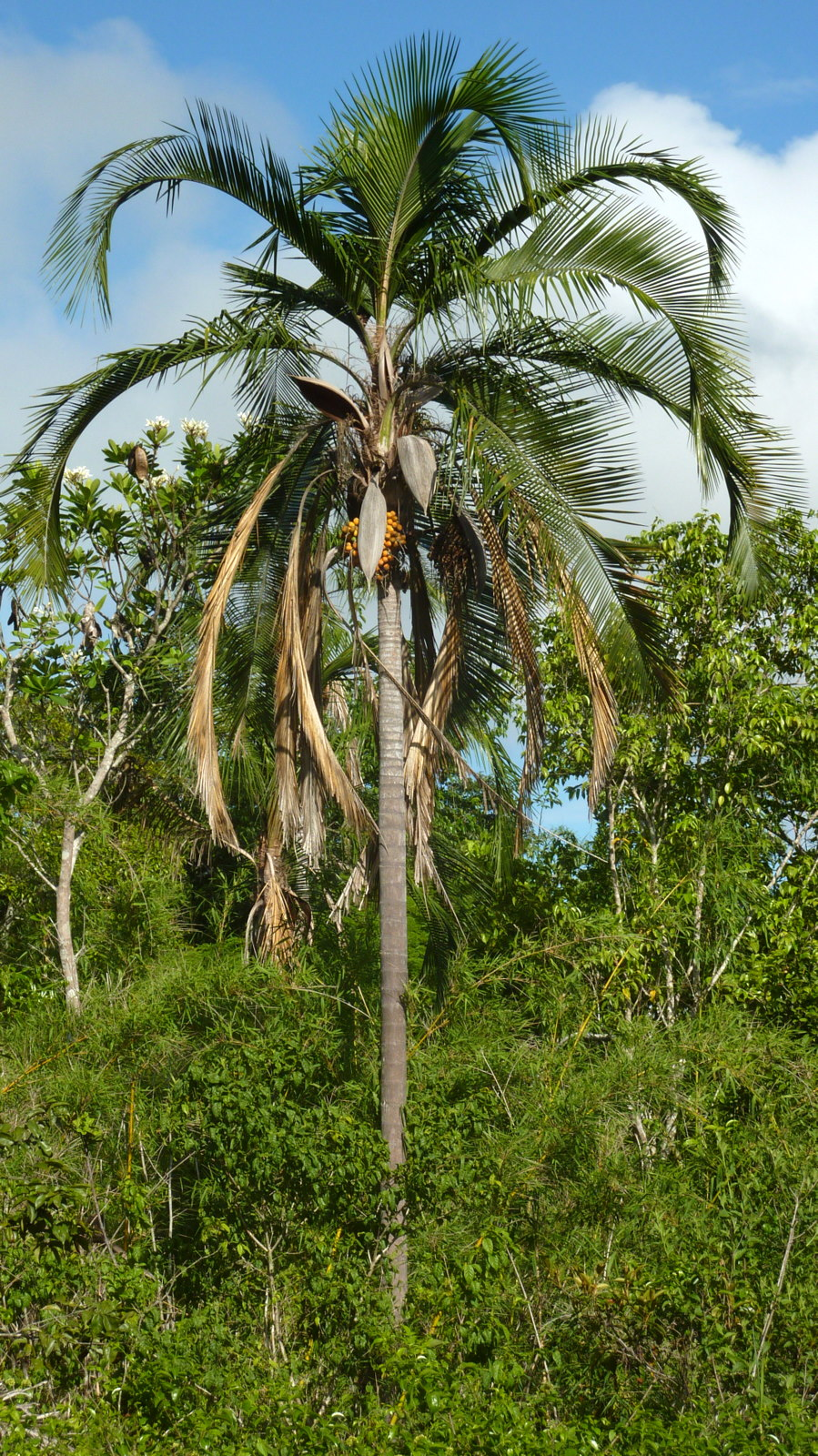

Conservation status
- Near Threatened (IUCN 2.3)

Scientific classification
- Kingdom: Plantae
- Clade: Tracheophytes
- Clade: Angiosperms
- Clade: Monocots
- Clade: Commelinids
- Order: Arecales
- Family: Arecaceae
- Genus: Syagrus
- Species: S. botryophora

Binomial name
- Syagrus botryophora (C. Martius) C. Martius

= Syagrus botryophora =

Species of palm

Syagrus botryophora is a species of flowering plant in the family Arecaceae. It is endemic to Brazil. It is threatened by habitat loss.
