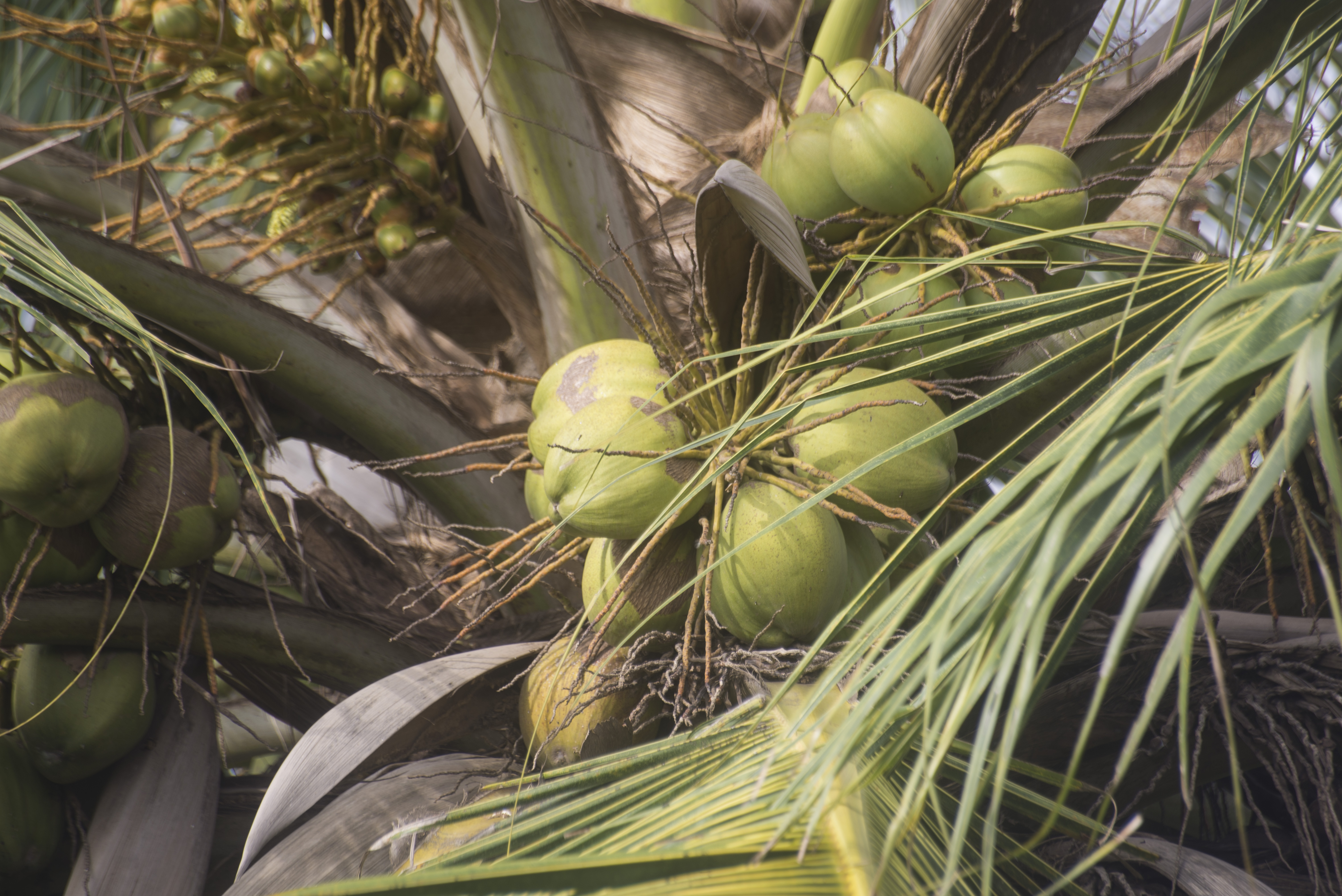
- Coconut fruit (Cocos nucifera)

Scientific classification
- Kingdom: Plantae
- Clade: Tracheophytes
- Clade: Angiosperms
- Clade: Monocots
- Clade: Commelinids
- Order: Arecales
- Family: Arecaceae
- Subfamily: Arecoideae
- Tribe: Cocoseae
- Subtribe: Attaleinae; Drude

= Attaleinae =

Tribe of palms

Attaleinae is a subtribe of plants in the family Arecaceae. Genera in the subtribe, the majority of which are found in South America, are:

- Beccariophoenix – Madagascar
- Jubaeopsis – South Africa; monotypic genus
- Voanioala – NE Madagascar; monotypic genus; monotypic genus
- Allagoptera – Central South America
- Attalea – Americas
- Butia – SE South America
- Cocos – cosmopolitan; monotypic genus
- Jubaea – Chile; monotypic genus
- Syagrus – South America
- Parajubaea – Andes

== See also ==
- List of Arecaceae genera
