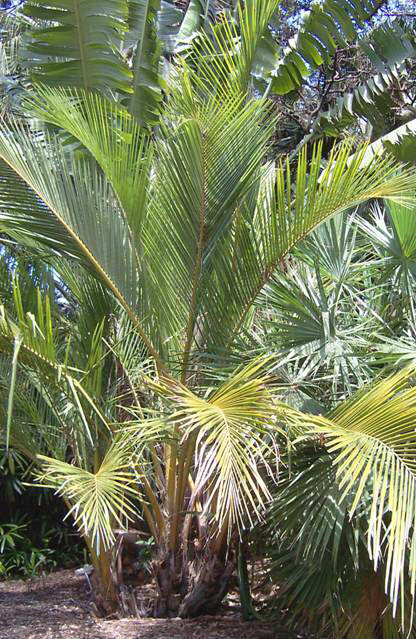

Conservation status
- Vulnerable (IUCN 2.3)

Scientific classification
- Kingdom: Plantae
- Clade: Tracheophytes
- Clade: Angiosperms
- Clade: Monocots
- Clade: Commelinids
- Order: Arecales
- Family: Arecaceae
- Subfamily: Arecoideae
- Tribe: Cocoseae
- Subtribe: Attaleinae
- Genus: Jubaeopsis; Becc.
- Species: J. afra

Binomial name
- Jubaeopsis afra Becc.

Synonyms
- Jubaeopsis caffra

= Jubaeopsis =

Monotypic genus of palms

Jubaeopsis afra, the Pondoland palm, is a flowering plant species in the palm family (Arecaceae). It belongs to the monotypic genus Jubaeopsis.

It is endemic to South Africa, where it is threatened due to habitat loss. This tree is a living fossil, being the last remaining lineage of the palm trees that were widespread in southern Africa in prehistoric times.

== Taxonomy ==
Jubaeopsis is named after King Juba II.

The etymology of the original species name caffra is related to kaffir, an ethnic slur used towards black people in Africa. At the July 2024 International Botanical Congress, a vote was held with the result that "caffra" related names will be emended to afra related ones, with the implementation of this being done at the end of July 2024.
