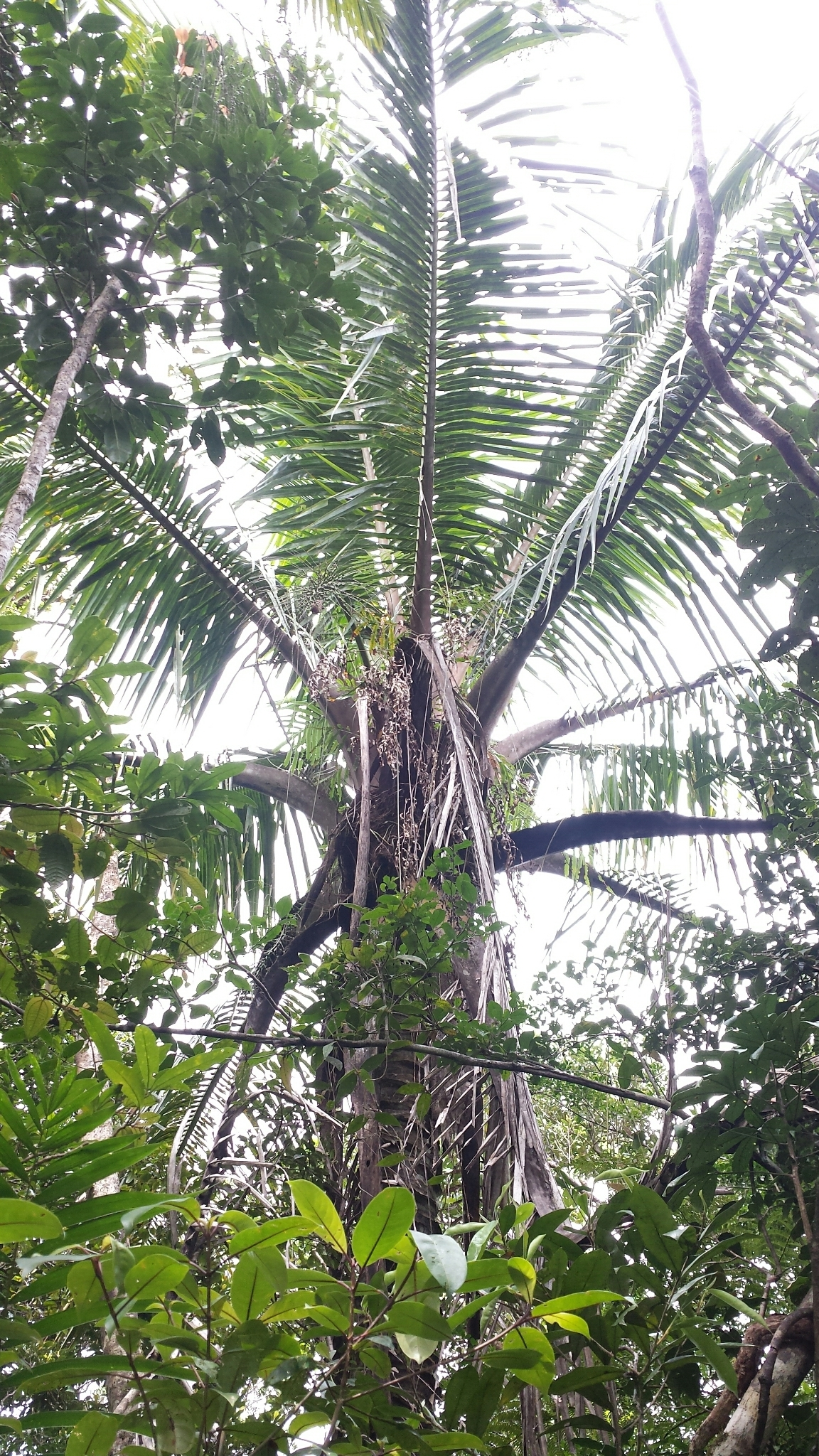

Conservation status
- Critically Endangered (IUCN 3.1)
- CITES Appendix II

Scientific classification
- Kingdom: Plantae
- Clade: Tracheophytes
- Clade: Angiosperms
- Clade: Monocots
- Clade: Commelinids
- Order: Arecales
- Family: Arecaceae
- Subfamily: Arecoideae
- Tribe: Cocoseae
- Subtribe: Attaleinae
- Genus: Voanioala; J. Dransf.
- Species: V. gerardii

Binomial name
- Voanioala gerardii J. Dransf.

= Voanioala =

Genus of palms

Voanioala gerardii, commonly known as the forest coconut, is a species of flowering plant in the family Arecaceae. It is a relative of the coconut, and is generally regarded as monotypic within the genus Voanioala. However, a team of geneticists headed by Bee F. Gunn found sufficient genetic variation within Voanioala to constitute at least two and possibly four cryptospecies. Voanioala is endemic to Madagascar, and is threatened by habitat loss. Voanioala is harvested for its edible seeds and palm heart. It is estimated that there are fewer than 15 mature trees remaining.

== Description ==
The forest coconut is a Madagascan tree that can reach 15–20 meters high in the wild. It is supported by a strong root base, and its leaves sprout from the crown. Voanioala can reach up to 5 meters in height. The leaflets are waxy, green, and stiff, and seventy of them can grow from each side of a leaf. The fruit grows in groups at the crown with a thick reddish-brown color. Each seed is up to 2.8 inches (7 cm) long and 1.5 inches (3.5 cm) thick and is longitudinally grooved. A scientifically remarkable trait is that each cell has about 600 chromosomes, which is extraordinary for a monocotyledon.

The fleshy, fibrous fruit of these trees has a highly sculptured endocarp (woody inner layer surrounding the seed), which has been suggested to be an adaptation to being swallowed and surviving the crop of elephant birds, an extinct group of large flightless birds formerly native to the island, as New Guinea palm fruit with similar features, belonging to the genera Ptychococcus, Brassiophoenix and Licuala are readily eaten by cassowaries who serve as their major seed dispersers. The trees appear to lack effective living seed dispersers, and rotting fruit blankets the ground beneath the trees, with seedlings seemingly unable to disperse significant distances away from mature trees without human intervention.

== Distribution ==
Voanioala gerardii is endemic to Madagascar, and is found in only the Bay of Antongil of the Masoala Peninsula, in the northeastern area of the island. It is extremely rare.

== Habitat ==
The forest coconut is found in the bottom of swampy valleys, as well as slopes in rainforests at an elevation of 200–450 meters above sea level.

== Conservation ==
Voanioala gerardii is critically endangered because of its scarcity. Only 10-15 trees are found. They are cut down for their edible palm hearts, and their seeds are used for market trade. They are also rare because of its poor dispersal of seeds. Habitat loss through agricultural logging threatens forest coconuts as well. The national park in Masoala Peninsula protects the forest coconuts on its property, and its future depends greatly on the effort of the national park. Its population is currently decreasing.
