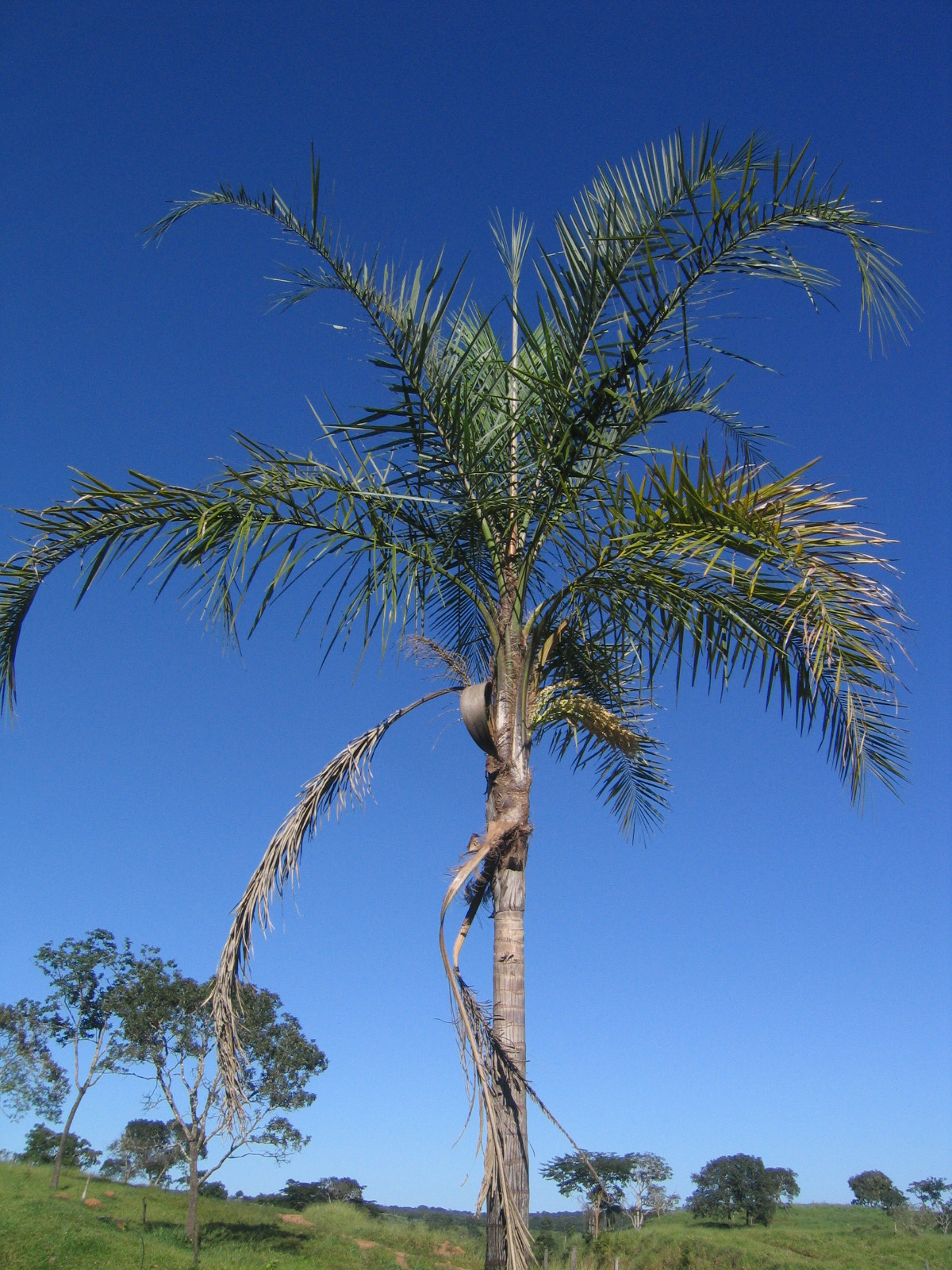

Scientific classification
- Kingdom: Plantae
- Clade: Tracheophytes
- Clade: Angiosperms
- Clade: Monocots
- Clade: Commelinids
- Order: Arecales
- Family: Arecaceae
- Genus: Syagrus
- Species: S. oleracea

Binomial name
- Syagrus oleracea (Mart.) Becc. 1916

Synonyms
- Cocos flexuosa Mart. Cocos oleracea Mart. (basiônimo); Syagrus flexuosa (Mart.) Becc. Syagrus gomesii Glassman

= Syagrus oleracea =

Species of palm

Syagrus oleracea, the guariroba or palmito amargo, is a species of palm native to Brazil.

== Etymology ==
The term "guariroba" originates from the Tupi word gwarai-rob, which means "the bitter one".

Other common names include gueiroba, gueroba, gariroba, gairoba, palmito-amargoso, catolé, coco-babão, pati-amargoso, coco-amargoso, and coqueiro-amargoso.

== Description ==
This elegant species has a tall, slender trunk and arched, feathery leaves. In Brazil, this is a very popular ornamental plant, and it is also cultivated to obtain its apical bud, with a somewhat bitter taste, and for its large fruits.

The solitary, columnar tree reaches up to 20 meters (70 ft) in height. It has large leaves up to 3 meters (10 ft) long and flowers that appear in clusters during the spring until the autumn.

Its slightly elliptical fruit, yellowish-green in color, whose mesocarp and oilseed kernel are edible, occurs in clusters between October and February. This palm is cultivated by seeds, although it grows spontaneously in the forests of the Midwest and Southeast of Brazil. It prefers warm weather and well-drained soil.

== Occurrence ==
It is distributed throughout the semi-deciduous forests and the Cerrado of Brazil, and also found in the Caatinga biome. It has also been reported in Paraguay and Bolivia.

== Uses ==
Among its products, the palm heart or terminal bud stands out. Considered by many as a bitter-flavored vegetable — which in fact is when compared to sweet hearts of Atlantic Forest species — the guariroba heart of palm is a delicacy of wide culinary use in some states, including some regions of Goiás and Minas Gerais.

In the good recipes of empadão goiano, for example, it is essential to include good pieces of guariroba bitter heart of palm. Substantial food and very strong seasoning, the filling of this pie, together with guariroba, must contain pieces of chicken, preferably thighs, sausages, potatoes and whole boiled eggs or just broken in half and ripe tomatoes. It can also be used as a salad: with cherry tomatoes and plenty of seasoning.

Edible oil is extracted from the seed.

The plant is also widely used in landscaping in squares and mainly in central flowerbeds of streets and avenues in cities in the interior of Goiás, as an example in the city of Jataí that over the years has been planting thousands of seedlings throughout the city.
