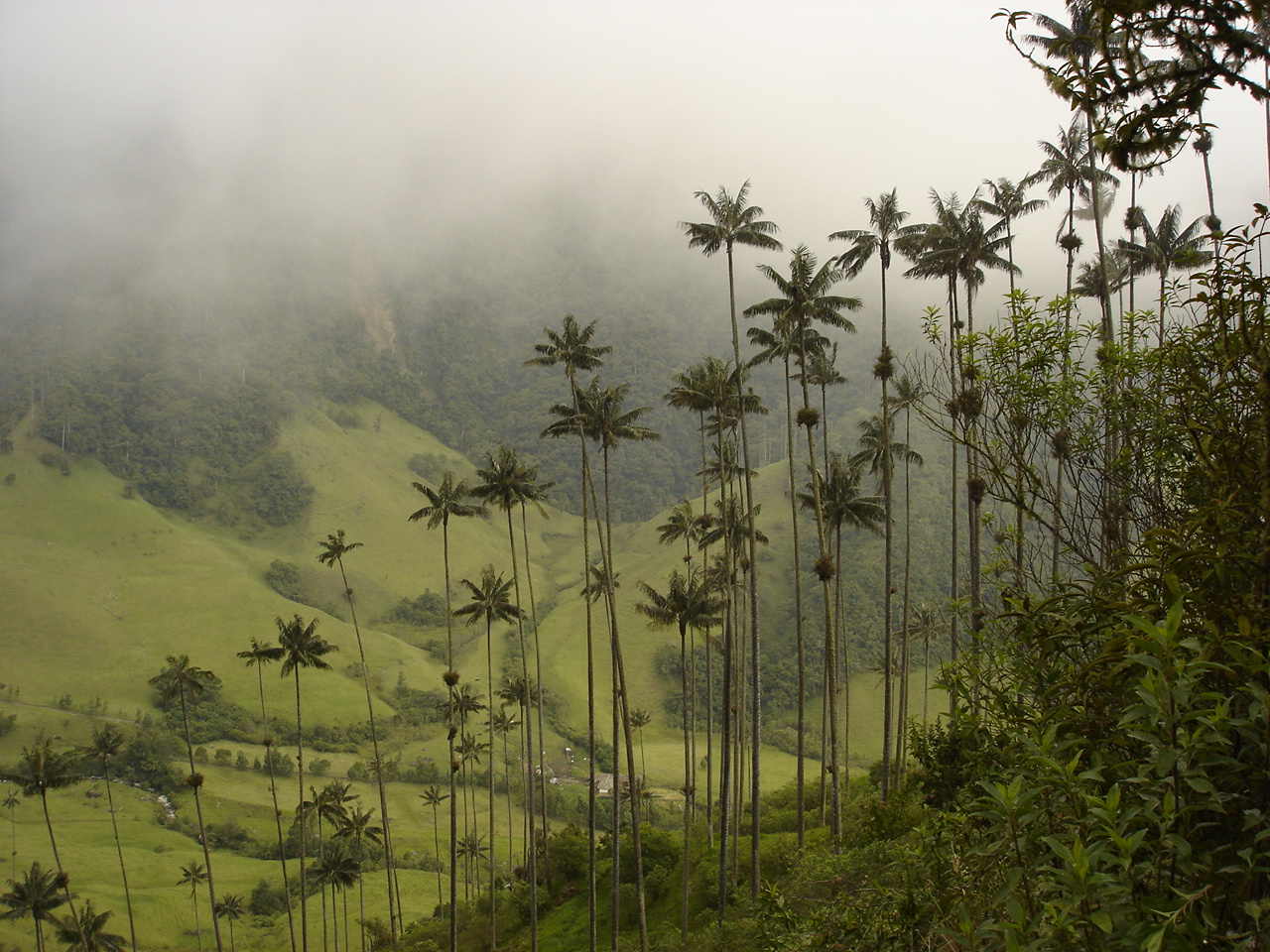
- Ceroxylon quindiuense

Scientific classification
- Kingdom: Plantae
- Clade: Embryophytes
- Clade: Tracheophytes
- Clade: Spermatophytes
- Clade: Angiosperms
- Clade: Monocots
- Clade: Commelinids
- Order: Arecales
- Family: Arecaceae
- Subfamily: Ceroxyloideae
- Tribe: Ceroxyleae; Satake 1962

Type genus
- Ceroxylon
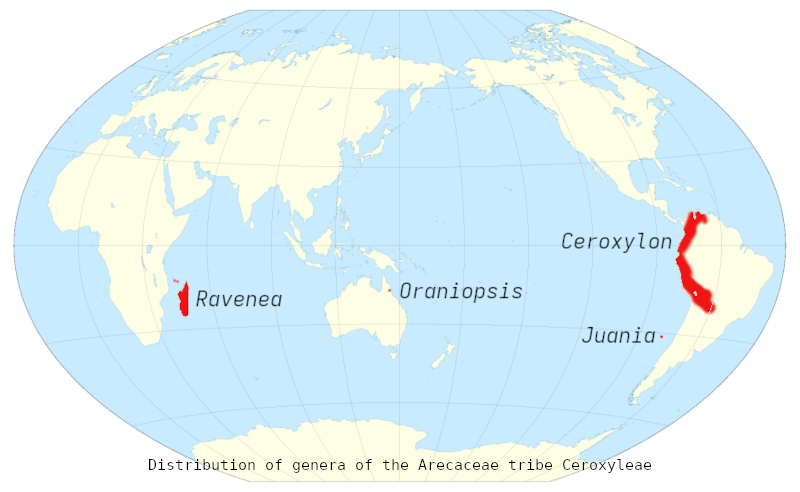

= Ceroxyleae =

Tribe of palms

Ceroxyleae is a tribe of plants in the family Arecaceae.

== Genera ==
Genera in the tribe are:

Image	Genus	Living species	Distribution
	Ceroxylon Bonpl. ex DC	Ceroxylon alpinum Bonpl. ex DC. - Colombia, Venezuela; Ceroxylon amazonicum Galeano - Ecuador; Ceroxylon ceriferum (H.Karst.) Pittier - Colombia, Venezuela; Ceroxylon echinulatum Galeano - Ecuador, Peru; Ceroxylon parvifrons (Engel) H.Wendl. - Colombia, Venezuela, Ecuador, Peru, Bolivia; Ceroxylon parvum Galeano - Ecuador; Ceroxylon peruvianum Galeano, Sanín & K.Mejia - Peru; Ceroxylon pityrophyllum (Mart.) Mart. ex H.Wendl. - Peru, Bolivia; Ceroxylon quindiuense (H.Karst.) H.Wendl. - Colombia, Peru; Ceroxylon sasaimae Galeano - Antioquia, Cundinamarca; Ceroxylon ventricosum Burret - Colombia, Ecuador; Ceroxylon vogelianum (Engel) H.Wendl. - Colombia, Venezuela, Ecuador, Peru	northern Andes
	Juania Drude	Juania australis Drude ex Hook.f.	Juan Fernández Islands
	Oraniopsis (Becc.) J. Dransf. A.K.Irvine & N.W.Uhl	Oraniopsis appendiculata (F.M.Bailey) J.Dransf., A.K.Irvine & N.W.Uhl	Queensland
	Ravenea C.D.Bouché	Ravenea albicans (Jum.) Beentje; Ravenea beentjei Rakotoarin. & J.Dransf.; Ravenea cycadifolia J.Dransf.; Ravenea declivium J.Dransf. & Rakotoarin.; Ravenea delicatula Rakotoarin.; Ravenea dransfieldii Beentje; Ravenea glauca Jum. & H.Perrier; Ravenea hildebrandtii H.Wendl. ex C.D.Bouché; Ravenea hypoleuca Rakotoarin. & J.Dransf.; Ravenea julietiae Beentje; Ravenea krociana Beentje; Ravenea lakatra (Jum.) Beentje; Ravenea latisecta Jum.; Ravenea louvelii Beentje; Ravenea madagascariensis Becc.; Ravenea moorei J.Dransf. & N.W.Uhl; Ravenea musicalis Beentje; Ravenea nana Beentje; Ravenea rivularis Jum. & H.Perrier; Ravenea robustior Jum. & H.Perrier; Ravenea sambiranensis Jum. & H.Perrier; Ravenea xerophila Jum.	Madagascar and Comoros

== See also ==
- List of Arecaceae genera
