= Ceroxyloideae =

- Ceroxylon, the type genus.

Scientific classification
- Kingdom: Plantae
- Clade: Tracheophytes
- Clade: Angiosperms
- Clade: Monocots
- Clade: Commelinids
- Order: Arecales
- Family: Arecaceae
- Subfamily: Ceroxyloideae; Drude

Tribes
- Ceroxyleae; Cyclospatheae; Phytelepheae
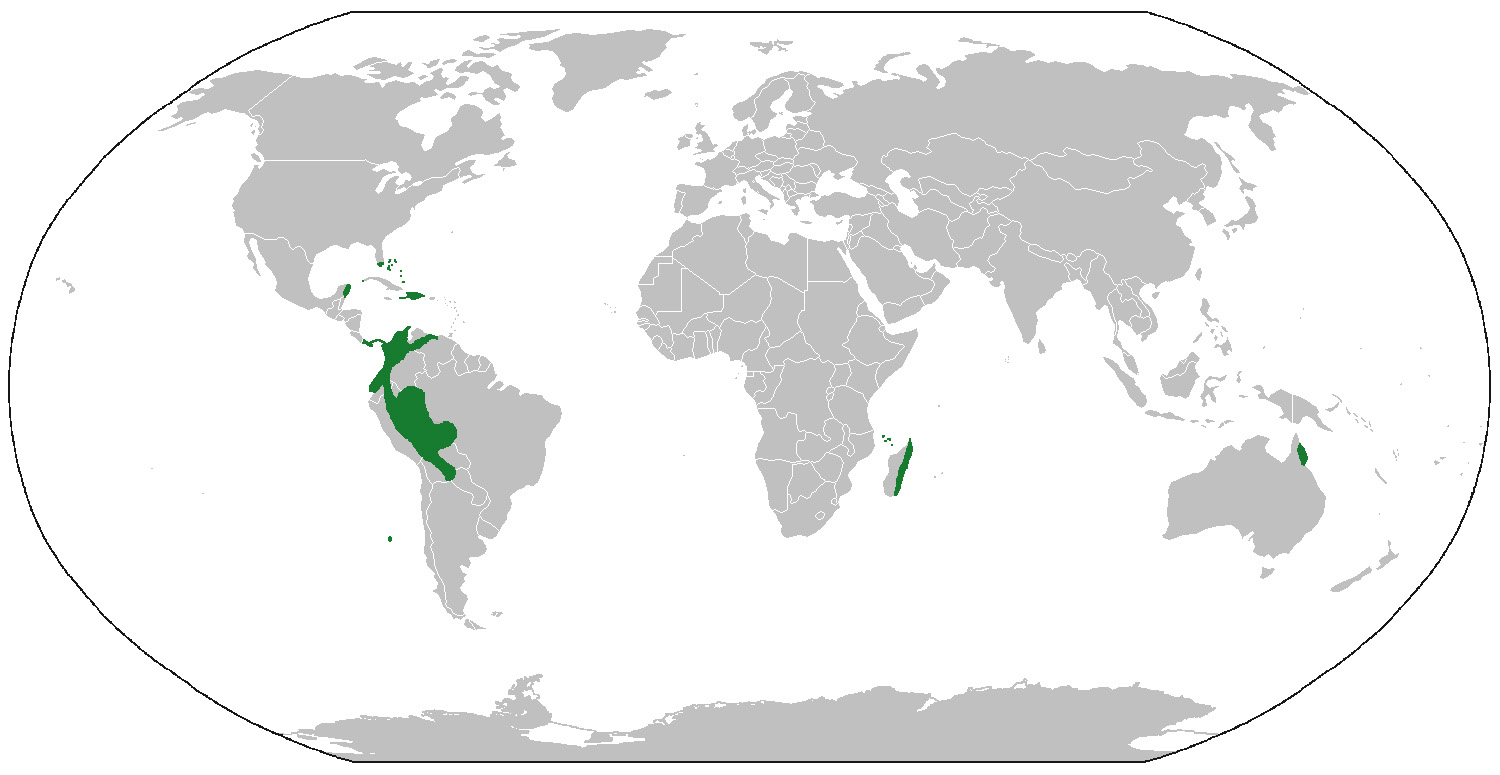

Subfamily of palms

The Ceroxyloideae are a subfamily of flowering plants in the palm family found mainly in the Americas with an outlying genus in each of Australia, Madagascar, and the Comoros. Recently revised, the former subfamily Phytelephantoideae was reduced to the tribal level and included, while the Hyophorbeae tribe was reassigned to Arecoideae; it now contains eight genera.

== Description ==
From small to moderate to the tallest in the family, the trunks may be solitary or clustering and lack armament. The reduplicate leaf is regularly or irregularly pinnate, bifid, or entire with pinnate ribs; crownshafts are present in some members and absent in others. Monoecious, dioecious, and hermaphroditic palms occur in the group; a protective prophyll accompanies the inflorescence, and all feature peduncular bracts. Any unisexual flowers are slightly dimorphic, solitary, or in rows; all have syncarpous, triovulate gynoecium.

== Tribes ==
=== Ceroxyleae ===
Four widely spread genera occur in South America, Australia, and Madagascar, characterized by tall, rarely slender, trunks which lack crownshafts. The flowers are early-opening, solitary, spirally or subdistichously arranged, with small bracts.

Image	Genus	Species
	Ceroxylon Bonpl. ex DC.	Ceroxylon alpinum Bonpl. ex DC. - Colombia, Venezuela; Ceroxylon amazonicum Galeano - Ecuador; Ceroxylon ceriferum (H.Karst.) Pittier - Colombia, Venezuela; Ceroxylon echinulatum Galeano - Ecuador, Peru; Ceroxylon parvifrons (Engel) H.Wendl. - Colombia, Venezuela, Ecuador, Peru, Bolivia; Ceroxylon parvum Galeano - Ecuador; Ceroxylon peruvianum Galeano, Sanín & K.Mejia - Peru; Ceroxylon pityrophyllum (Mart.) Mart. ex H.Wendl. - Peru, Bolivia; Ceroxylon quindiuense (H.Karst.) H.Wendl. - Colombia, Peru; Ceroxylon sasaimae Galeano - Antioquia, Cundinamarca; Ceroxylon ventricosum Burret - Colombia, Ecuador; Ceroxylon vogelianum (Engel) H.Wendl. - Colombia, Venezuela, Ecuador, Peru
	Juania Drude	Juania australis, the Chonta palm
	Oraniopsis (Becc.) J. Dransf. A.K.Irvine & N.W.Uhl	Oraniopsis appendiculata
	Ravenea C.D.Bouché	Ravenea albicans (Jum.) Beentje; Ravenea beentjei Rakotoarin. & J.Dransf; Ravenea delicatula Rakotoarin.; Ravenea dransfieldii Beentje; Ravenea glauca Jum. & H.Perrier; Ravenea hildebrandtii H.Wendl. ex Bouché; Ravenea hypoleuca Rakotoarin. & J.Dransf.; Ravenea julietiae Beentje; Ravenea krociana Beentje; Ravenea lakatra (Jum.) Beentje; Ravenea latisecta Jum.; Ravenea louvelii Beentje; Ravenea madagascariensis Becc.; Ravenea moorei J.Dransf. & N.W.Uhl; Ravenea musicalis Beentje; Ravenea nana Beentje; Ravenea rivularis Jum. & H.Perrier; Ravenea robustior Jum. & H.Perrier; Ravenea sambiranensis Jum. & H.Perrier; Ravenea xerophila Jum.

=== Cyclospatheae ===
A monotypic tribe from North and Central America, they have moderately sized, erect trunks, with crownshafts. The flowers are solitary, spirally arranged, hermaphroditic, and borne in the axils of small bracts.

Image	Genus	Species
	Pseudophoenix H.Wendl. ex Sarg.	Pseudophoenix ekmanii; Pseudophoenix lediniana; Pseudophoenix sargentii; Pseudophoenix vinifera

=== Phytelepheae ===
Three genera of dioecious South American palms, with moderate to large, acaulescent or erect trunks, their staminate inflorescences are spike-like, while the pistillate are branched and spreading. The fruit is usually borne in dense clusters, each containing five to 10 seeds.

Image	Genus	Species
	Ammandra O.F.Cook	Ammandra decasperma
	Aphandra Barfod	Aphandra natalia
	Phytelephas Ruiz & Pav.	Phytelephas aequatorialis Spruce – Ecuadorean ivory palm - Ecuador; Phytelephas macrocarpa Ruiz & Pav. – Large-fruited ivory palm - northwestern Brazil, Bolivia, Peru, Colombia; Phytelephas olsonii R.W. Brown; Phytelephas schottii H.Wendl. – Colombian ivory palm - Colombia; Phytelephas seemannii O.F.Cook - Colombia, Panama; Phytelephas tenuicaulis (Barfod) A.J.Hend. - Colombia, Ecuador, Peru; Phytelephas tumacana O.F.Cook - Nariño Department of Colombia
