= Gloria Galeano Garcés =

Colombian scientist (1958–2016)

- Born: April 22, 1958; Medellín, Colombia
- Died: February 23, 2016 (aged 57)
- Scientific career
- Fields: agronomy, botany
- Thesis: Quantitative forest inventories on the Pacific coast of Chocó, Colombia
- Author abbrev. (botany): Galeano

Gloria Amparo Galeano Garcés (April 22, 1958 – March 23, 2016) was a Colombian botanist and agronomist specializing in the palm family. Galeano was a faculty member at the National University of Colombia, and was the director of the Institute of Natural Sciences from 2003 to 2006. She received her Ph.D. from the University of Aarhus, Denmark in 1997.

Galeano authored taxonomic descriptions of 58 species, subspecies and varieties of plants, especially in the palm family. She published 17 books, 68 scientific papers, and 15 book chapters, mostly on palm and its taxonomy, systematics, ecology, uses, traditional knowledge, ecology, conservation and harvest impacts of Colombian plants and Neotropical palms. She also co-authored a field guide to the palms of the Americas.

In 1996 she won the science prize from Fundación Alejandro Angel Escobar for the Field guide to American palms (co-authored by Andrew Henderson & Rodrigo Bernal).

The palm species Geonoma galeanoae is named after her.

== New species of plants discovered ==
=== Arecaceae ===
- Aiphanes acaulis Galeano & R.Bernal – Principes 29(1): 20. 1985
- Aiphanes graminifolia Galeano & R.Bernal – Caldasia 24(2): 277 (-280; fig. 1). 2002
- Astrocaryum triandrum Galeano, R.Bernal & F.Kahn – Candollea 43(1): 279 (1988)
- Bactris rostrata Galeano & R.Bernal – Caldasia 24(2): 280 (-283; fig. 2). 2002
- Ceroxylon amazonicum Galeano – Caldasia 17: 398 fig. 1995
- Ceroxylon echinulatum Galeano – Caldasia 17: 399-402 fig. 1995
- Ceroxylon parvum Galeano – Caldasia 17: 403 1995
- Ceroxylon peruvianum Galeano, Sanín & K.Mejia – Revista Peru. Biol. 15(Supl. 1): 65 (-67; figs. 1-3). 2008
- Ceroxylon sasaimae Galeano – Caldasia 17: 404-405 fig. 1995
- Chamaedorea murriensis Galeano – Principes 31: 143 1987
- Chamaedorea ricardoi R.Bernal, Galeano & Hodel – Palms 48(1): 27 (-29; fig. 1). 2004
- Geonoma chlamydostachys Galeano-Garcés – Principes 30: 71 1986
- Geonoma santanderensis Galeano & R.Bernal – Caldasia 24(2): 282 (-284; fig. 3). 2002
- Geonoma wilsonii Galeano & R.Bernal – Caldasia 24(2):284 (-290; figs. 4-5). 2002
- Oenocarpus makeru R.Bernal, Galeano & A.J.Hend. – Brittonia 43(3): 158 (1991)
- Oenocarpus simplex R.Bernal, Galeano & A.J.Hend. – Brittonia 43(3): 154 (1991)
- Sabinaria R.Bernal & Galeano – Phytotaxa 144: 28. 2013
- Sabinaria magnifica Galeano & R.Bernal – Phytotaxa 144: 34
- Wettinia oxycarpa Galeano & R.Bernal – Caldasia 13(65): 695 (1983)

=== Cyclanthaceae ===
- Asplundia harlingiana Galeano & R.Bernal – Caldasia 14: 27 (-28). 1984
- Asplundia sanctae-ritae Galeano & R.Bernal – Caldasia 14: 28 (-29). 1984
- Asplundia sarmentosa Galeano & R.Bernal – Caldasia 14: 29 (-30). 1984
- Dicranopygium fissile Galeano & R.Bernal – Caldasia 14: 31, figs. 1984
- Dicranopygium scoparum Galeano & R.Bernal – Caldasia 14: 32, figs. 1984
