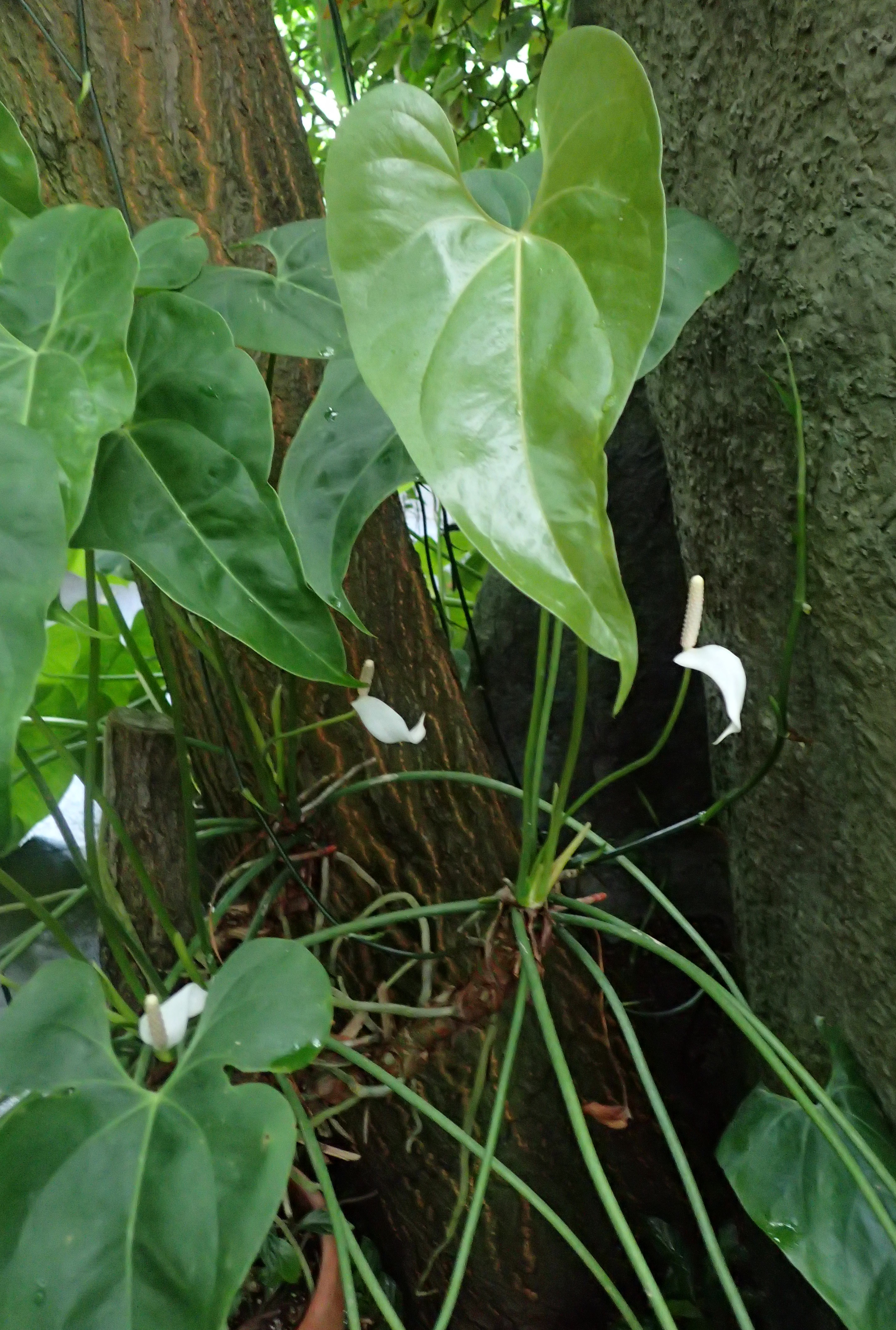

Scientific classification
- Kingdom: Plantae
- Clade: Tracheophytes
- Clade: Angiosperms
- Clade: Monocots
- Order: Alismatales
- Family: Araceae
- Genus: Anthurium
- Species: A. nymphaeifolium

Binomial name
- Anthurium nymphaeifolium K.Koch & C.D.Bouché

Synonyms
- Anthurium cardiophyllum K.Koch & Augustin; Anthurium cochleatum Moritz ex Schott; Anthurium fraternum Schott; Anthurium fucatum Schott; Anthurium inamoenum Schott; Anthurium lindenianum Engl.; Anthurium nymphaeifolium var. cochleatum (Moritz ex Schott) Engl.; Anthurium nymphaeifolium var. fucatum (Schott) Engl.; Anthurium nymphaeifolium var. fulcratum Engl.; Anthurium nymphaeifolium var. ornatum (Schott) Kuntze; Anthurium nymphaeifolium var. ovatum Engl.; Anthurium nymphaeifolium var. roezlii Regel; Anthurium ornatum Schott; Anthurium quindiuense Schott

= Anthurium nymphaeifolium =

Species of flowering plant

Anthurium nymphaeifolium is a species of Anthurium found in Colombia to Venezuela.
