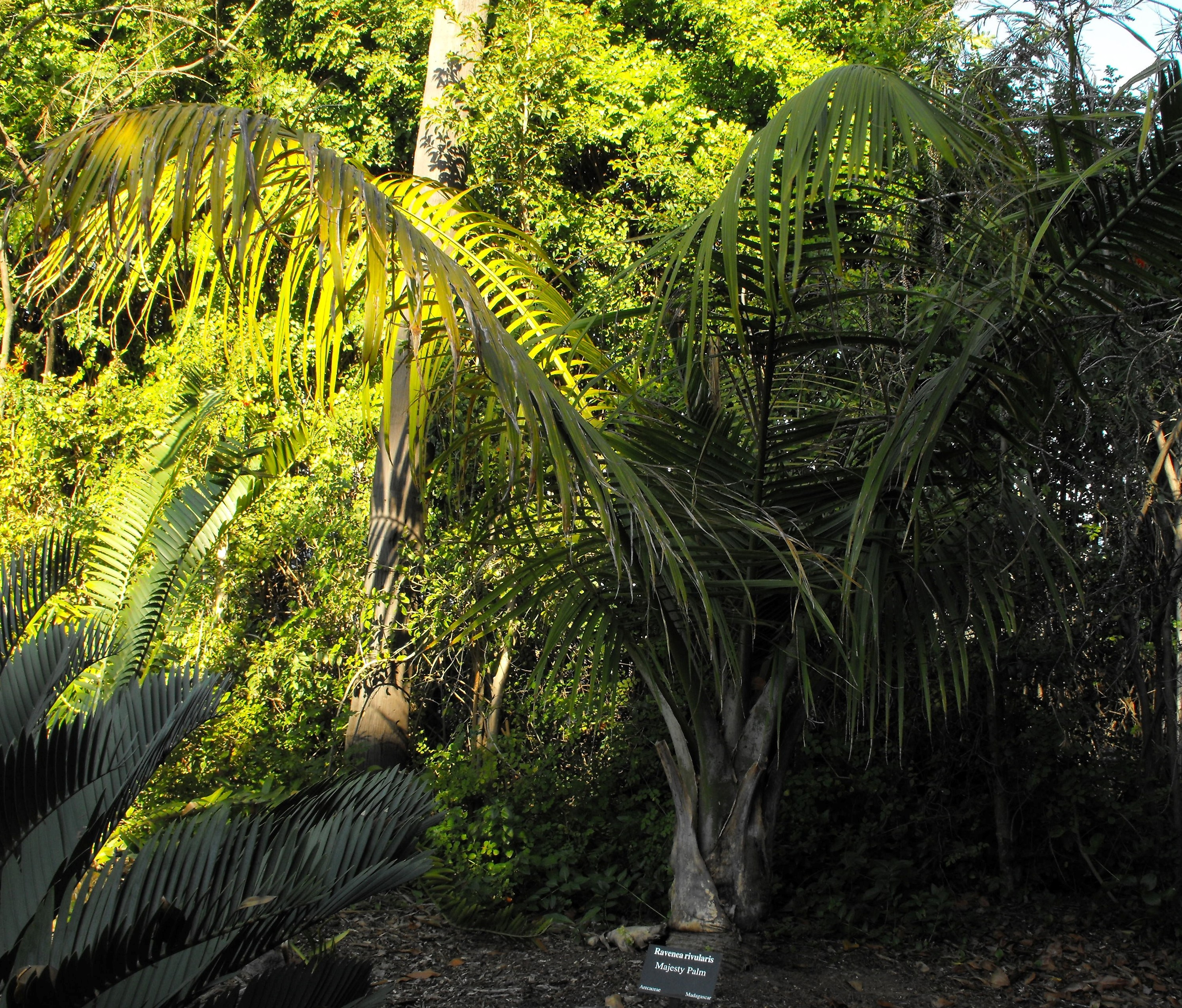
- Ravenea rivularis

Scientific classification
- Kingdom: Plantae
- Clade: Tracheophytes
- Clade: Angiosperms
- Clade: Monocots
- Clade: Commelinids
- Order: Arecales
- Family: Arecaceae
- Subfamily: Ceroxyloideae
- Tribe: Ceroxyleae
- Genus: Ravenea; H.Wendl. ex C.D.Bouché

Synonyms
- Ranevea L.H.Bailey; Louvelia Jum. & H.Perrier

= Ravenea =

Genus of palms

Ravenea is a genus of 20 known species of palms, all native to Madagascar and the Comoros. It is not to be confused with Ravenala, a genus of superficially palm-like plants also from Madagascar.

They are small to large, dioecious palms, with solitary, robust grey stems, swollen at base and gradually tapering upward. The species vary greatly in size, with R. hildebrandtii and R. nana only reaching 4 m, while R. robustior and R. sambiranensis both reach 30 m. The leaves are up to 2–5 m long, pinnately compound, reduplicate, erect at first then arching, twisted near the apex; with numerous crowded narrow ribbed leaflets. The inflorescence is short, borne among the leaves; the fruit is a red drupe. One particular species, Ravenea rivularis, is commonly cultivated as a houseplant and grown indoors all over the world. However, it is actually considered a vulnerable species in its wild habitat with fewer than 900 trees growing naturally.

== Species ==
Image	Scientific name	Conservation Status	Distribution
	Ravenea albicans (Jum.) Beentje	Endangered	Northeast Madagascar
	Ravenea beentjei Rakotoarin. & J.Dransf	Critically endangered	Vondrozo, Madagascar
	Ravenea cycadifolia J.Dransf.		Madagascar
	Ravenea declivium J.Dransf. & Rakotoarin.	Critically endangered	Madagascar
	Ravenea delicatula Rakotoarin.	Critically endangered	Northwest Madagascar
	Ravenea dransfieldii Beentje	Endangered	Madagascar
	Ravenea glauca Jum. & H.Perrier	Vulnerable	Madagascar
	Ravenea hildebrandtii H.Wendl. ex Bouché	Endangered	Comoros
	Ravenea hypoleuca Rakotoarin. & J.Dransf.	Critically endangered	Southeast Madagascar
	Ravenea julietiae Beentje	Endangered	Madagascar
	Ravenea krociana Beentje	Endangered	Madagascar
	Ravenea lakatra (Jum.) Beentje	Critically endangered	Madagascar
	Ravenea latisecta Jum.	Critically endangered	Eastern central Madagascar
	Ravenea louvelii Beentje	Critically endangered	Madagascar
	Ravenea madagascariensis Becc.	Least concern	Madagascar
	Ravenea moorei J.Dransf. & N.W.Uhl	Critically endangered	Comoros
	Ravenea musicalis Beentje	Critically endangered	Madagascar
	Ravenea nana Beentje	Endangered	Madagascar
	Ravenea rivularis Jum. & H.Perrier	Critically endangered	Madagascar
	Ravenea robustior Jum. & H.Perrier	Near threatened	Madagascar
	Ravenea sambiranensis Jum. & H.Perrier	Least concern	Madagascar
	Ravenea xerophila Jum.	Vulnerable	Madagascar

Most of the species are endangered. Species such as R. moorei are critically so, with only two specimens known, last seen in 1993 (IUCN report). R. louvelii is little better off, with fewer than 25 plants known (IUCN report). Overall, less than 50 trees of several species are still alive. Historical data indicates that populations are still decreasing for most, except for Ravenea sambiranesis and Ravenea madagascariensis. The species listed as critically endangered will most likely become extinct this century unless measures are taken to cultivate new trees and protect their habitats from being disrupted by deforestation and water pollution. Even if as few as a dozen trees of each species were planted on ideal, protected land where they could reproduce, it would give each species a much better chance for survival.

== Cultivation and uses ==
Ravenea rivularis (majesty palm) is widely cultivated in subtropical regions, and it is sold commercially as a houseplant. It is an adaptable palm that looks somewhat similar to the ever-popular queen palm. It is a very large palm with a large, untidy crown. It has symmetrical leaves and develops an attractive swollen base of the trunk. Majesty palms prefer full sun, plenty of water, and high humidity to ensure healthy growth. It is tolerant of different soil types. Propagation is by seeds, which germinate in 2–3 months.

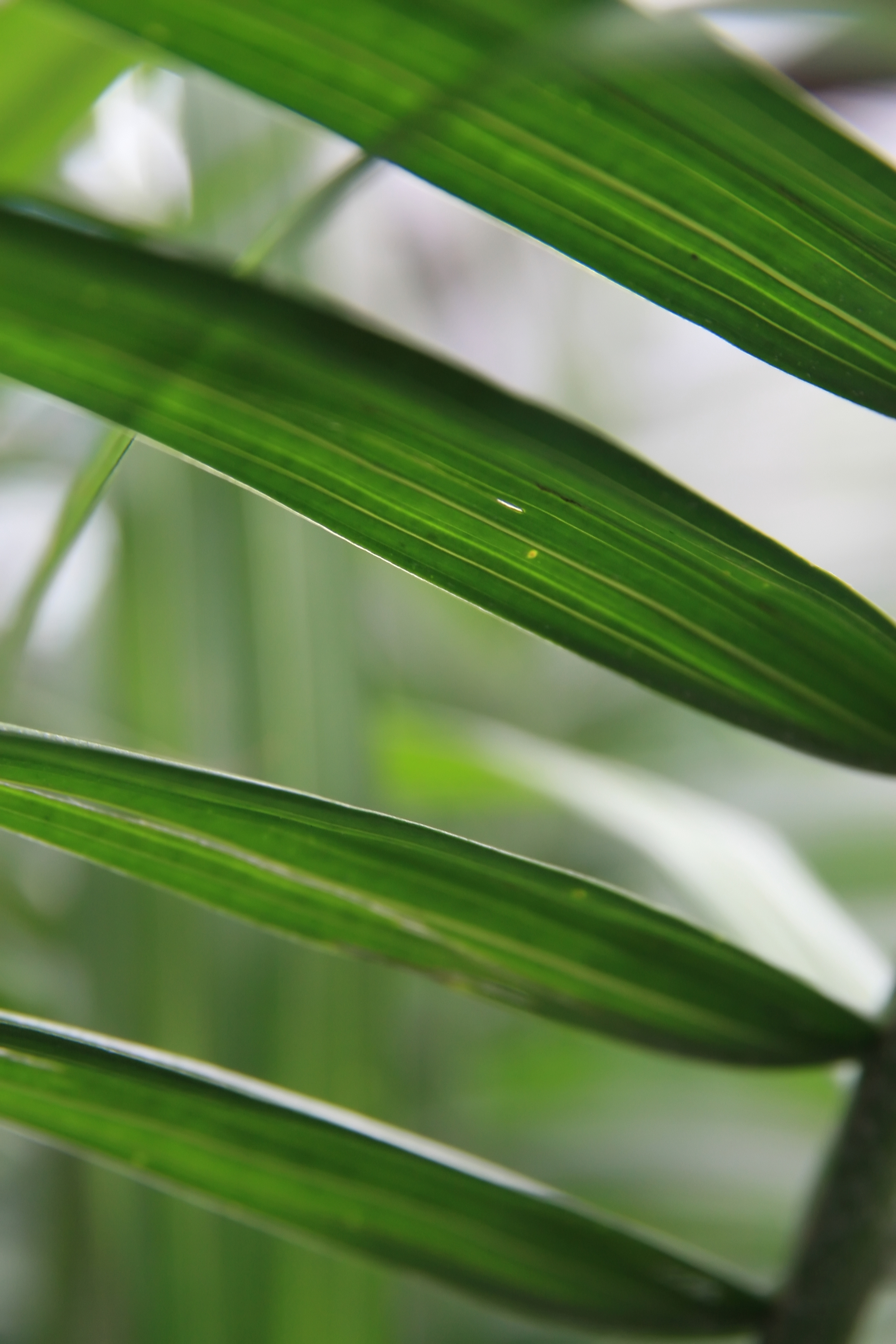
Pinnate leaves characteristic to Ravenea
