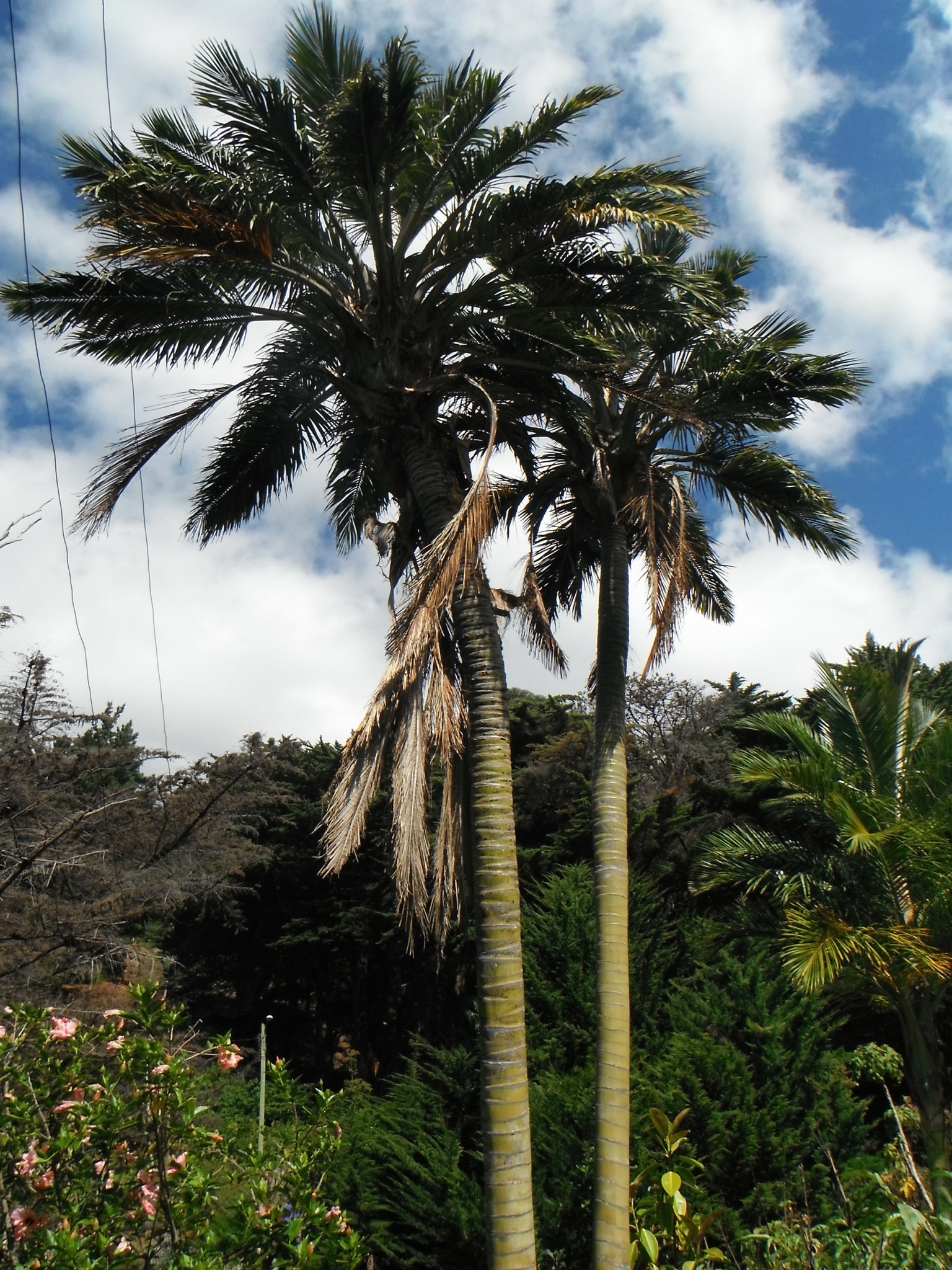
- Juania australis

Conservation status
- Critically Endangered (IUCN 3.1)

Scientific classification
- Kingdom: Plantae
- Clade: Tracheophytes
- Clade: Angiosperms
- Clade: Monocots
- Clade: Commelinids
- Order: Arecales
- Family: Arecaceae
- Subfamily: Ceroxyloideae
- Tribe: Ceroxyleae
- Genus: Juania; Drude
- Species: J. australis

Binomial name
- Juania australis Drude ex Hook.f.

= Juania =

Genus of palms

Juania australis, the Chonta palm, is a species of flowering plant in the family Arecaceae, the only species in the genus Juania. It is a solitary trunked palm tree which is endemic to the Juan Fernández Islands archipelago in the southeast Pacific Ocean west of Chile.

This palm is slow growing and has a green trunk; plants are either male or female. It is threatened by habitat loss. Only one mature tree grows outside its native island habitat. It is assessed as critically endangered on the IUCN Red List of Threatened Species.

== Cultivation ==
Juania australis is extremely rare in cultivation. Seeds from the Chonta palm are banned from being exported from the Juan Fernández Islands by the Chilean government, and so are virtually impossible to get hold of. The palm is also extremely hard to grow as it has very particular requirements, preferring cool night temperatures and summer temperatures below 25 °C (77 °F). It is cold tolerant to about −5 °C (23 °F). Seed germination in laboratory conditions is reportedly slow, and can span several months.

It can grow successfully in cultivation for years and then die for no apparent reason. They have been grown successfully in San Francisco, but two specimens were lost during an unusually hot summer. There is a large 7 m (23 ft) specimen at Earlscliffe in Dublin, Ireland, growing well where the climate seems to suit this rare palm tree.

== See also ==
- Fernandezian region
- Juan Fernández Islands flora
