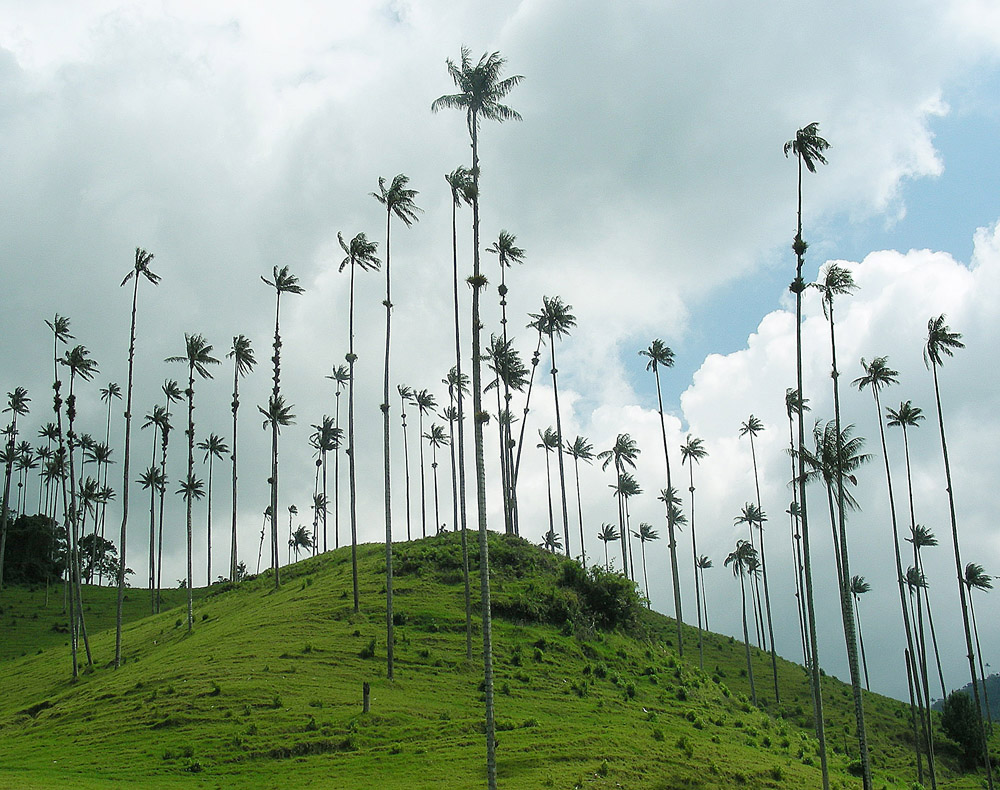
- Ceroxylon quindiuense

Scientific classification
- Kingdom: Plantae
- Clade: Tracheophytes
- Clade: Angiosperms
- Clade: Monocots
- Clade: Commelinids
- Order: Arecales
- Family: Arecaceae
- Subfamily: Ceroxyloideae
- Tribe: Ceroxyleae
- Genus: Ceroxylon; Bonpl. ex DC.

Type species
- Ceroxylon alpinum

Synonyms
- Klopstockia H.Karst.; Beethovenia Engel

= Ceroxylon =

Andean wax palms

Genus of palms

Ceroxylon is a genus of flowering plants in the family Arecaceae, native to the Andes in Venezuela, Colombia, Ecuador, Peru, and Bolivia, known as Andean wax palms.

The species are almost exclusively montane and include the tallest palm (and thus tallest monocotyledon), C. quindiuense, which reaches 61 m (200 ft) in height, and species growing at the highest altitude of the palm family (Arecaceae), at more than 3,000 m (10,000 ft) in elevation.

The genus name is derived from Ancient Greek κηρός (kērós ("wax") and ξύλον (xúlon, "wood").

== Taxonomy ==
Ceroxylon is most closely related to the genus Oraniopsis, which is restricted to northern Australia. The common ancestor of both genera likely dispersed across the Antarctic land bridge during the Late Eocene.

== Description ==
Ceroxylon palms develop single, smooth, wax-covered, often whitish cylindrical trunks encircled by ringed leafbase scars. Ceroxylon species are dioecious (the individual plant produces flowers of only one sex). Leaves are pinnate. Inflorescences emerge from among, and often project conspicuously beyond the leaves. Round fruits, up to one inch in diameter, are red or orange at maturity. Many Ceroxylon species are endangered by habitat destruction.

Two species of Andean wax palms, C. quindiuense and C. alpinum, provide nesting sites and food for a species of Colombian parrot now in danger of extinction, Ognorhynchus icterotis.

== Uses ==
In Colombia, Ceroxylon palms are frequently harvested for their wood. Ceroxylon palm leaves are also used in Palm Sunday ceremonies.

== Cultivation ==
Several Ceroxylon species, including C. quindiuense, C. alpinum, C. vogelianum, C. ventricosum, and C. parvifrons, are cultivated as ornamental trees outside their native range in cool, humid, mild climates with minimal frosts, such as parts of Australia, coastal California, Hawai'i, New Zealand, South Africa, and coastal Western Europe. The Jose Celestino Mutis Botanical Garden in Bogotá, Colombia, contains an extensive planting of Ceroxylon palms. Other public gardens where cultivated Ceroxylon spp. can be viewed include the San Francisco Botanical Garden in Golden Gate Park, San Francisco, California, the Huntington Botanical Gardens, in Pasadena (near Los Angeles), California, and the Oakland Palmetum at the Lakeside Garden Center in Oakland, California.

== Species ==
The genus contains the following species:

Image	Scientific name	Distribution
	Ceroxylon alpinum Bonpl. ex DC.	Colombia, Venezuela
	Ceroxylon amazonicum Galeano	Ecuador
	Ceroxylon ceriferum (H.Karst.) Pittier	Colombia, Venezuela
	Ceroxylon echinulatum Galeano	Ecuador, Peru
	Ceroxylon parvifrons (Engel) H.Wendl.	Colombia, Venezuela, Ecuador, Peru, Bolivia
	Ceroxylon parvum Galeano	Ecuador
	Ceroxylon peruvianum Galeano, Sanín & K.Mejia	Peru
	Ceroxylon pityrophyllum (Mart.) Mart. ex H.Wendl.	Peru, Bolivia
	Ceroxylon quindiuense (H.Karst.) H.Wendl.	Colombia
	Ceroxylon sasaimae Galeano	Antioquia, Cundinamarca
	Ceroxylon ventricosum Burret	Colombia, Ecuador
	Ceroxylon vogelianum (Engel) H.Wendl.	Colombia, Venezuela, Ecuador, Peru
