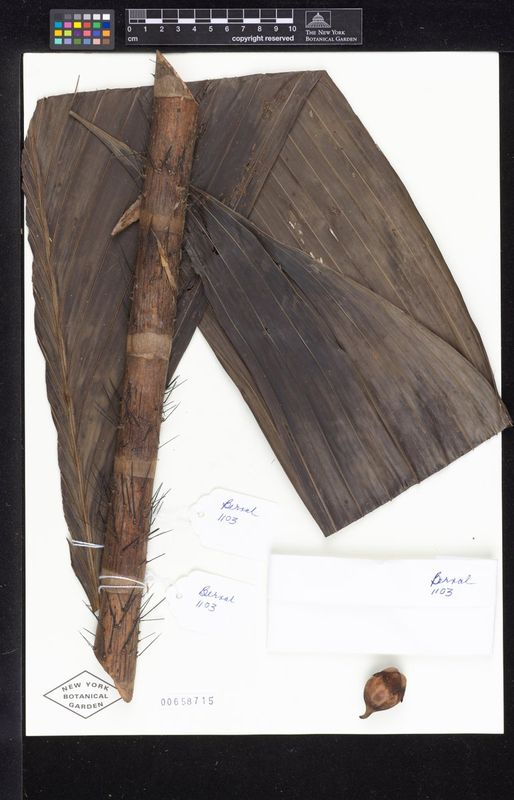

Scientific classification
- Kingdom: Plantae
- Clade: Embryophytes
- Clade: Tracheophytes
- Clade: Spermatophytes
- Clade: Angiosperms
- Clade: Monocots
- Clade: Commelinids
- Order: Arecales
- Family: Arecaceae
- Genus: Bactris
- Species: B. rostrata

Binomial name
- Bactris rostrata Galeano & R.Bernal

= Bactris rostrata =

Species of flowering plant

Bactris rostrata is a species of flowering plant in the family Arecaceae. It is a tree native to Colombia. The species was described in 2002.

== Taxonomy ==
The species was described by Gloria Amparo Galeano-Garces and Rodrigo Bernal in 2002.

== Distribution ==
Bactris rostrata is native to the wet tropical biome of Colombia.

== Description ==
Bactris rostrata is a tree.

== Nomenclature ==
In Spanish, the species is known as Chacarrá Picudo.
