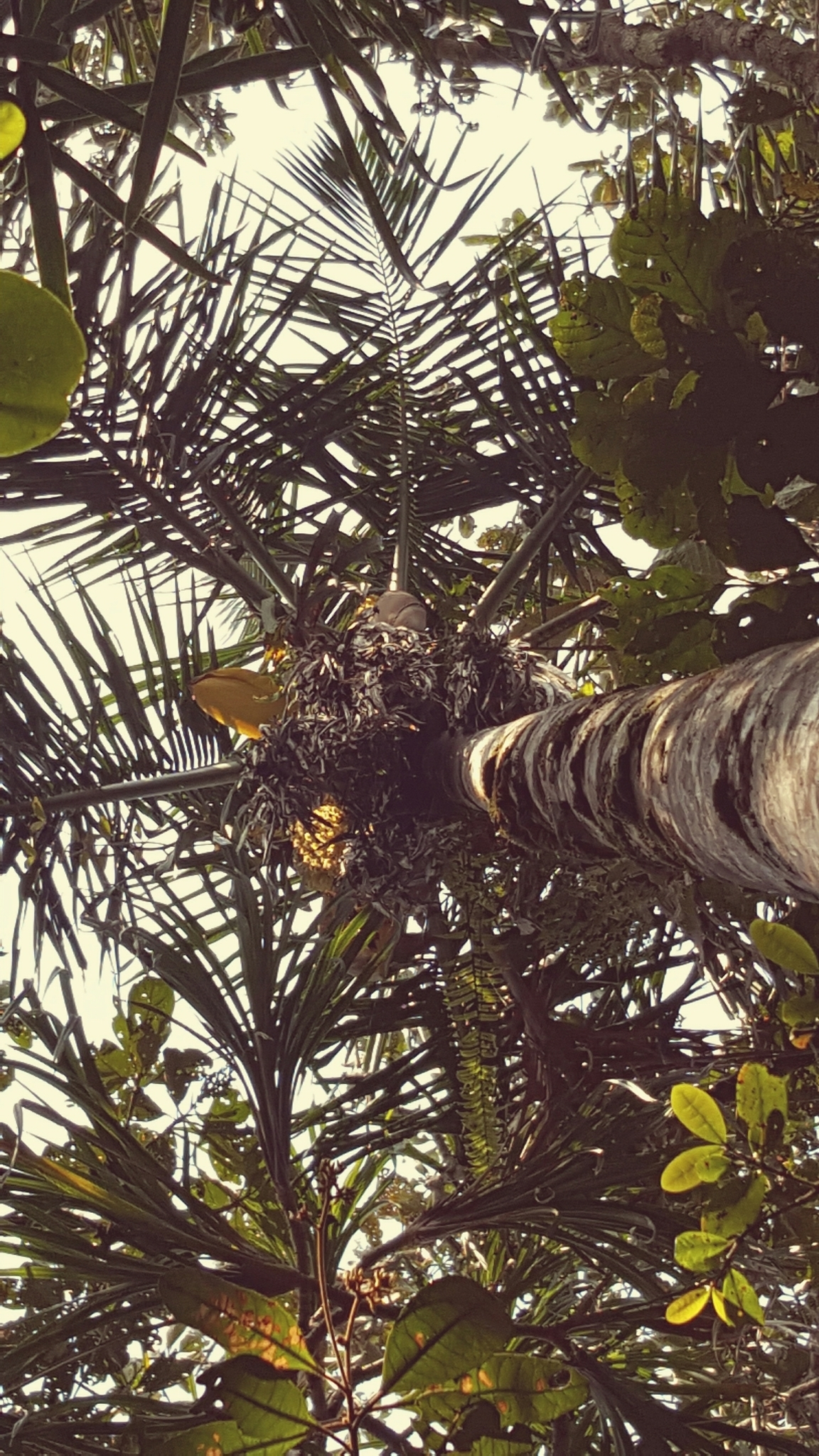

Conservation status
- Critically Endangered (IUCN 3.1)

Scientific classification
- Kingdom: Plantae
- Clade: Tracheophytes
- Clade: Angiosperms
- Clade: Monocots
- Clade: Commelinids
- Order: Arecales
- Family: Arecaceae
- Genus: Ravenea
- Species: R. beentjei

Binomial name
- Ravenea beentjei Rakotoarin & j.Dransf.

= Ravenea beentjei =

Species of palm

Ravenea beentjei is a species of palm tree. It is endemic to Madagascar, where it grows in a frequently flooded area within a single locality of southeast Madagascar called Vondrozo. There are only about 40 mature trees known in their natural range. Like the majority of species in the Ravenea genus, it requires ample freshwater to survive. Therefore, it grows in valleys and swampy areas within the lowland tropical and subtropical moist broadleaf forests that carpet eastern Madagascar.
