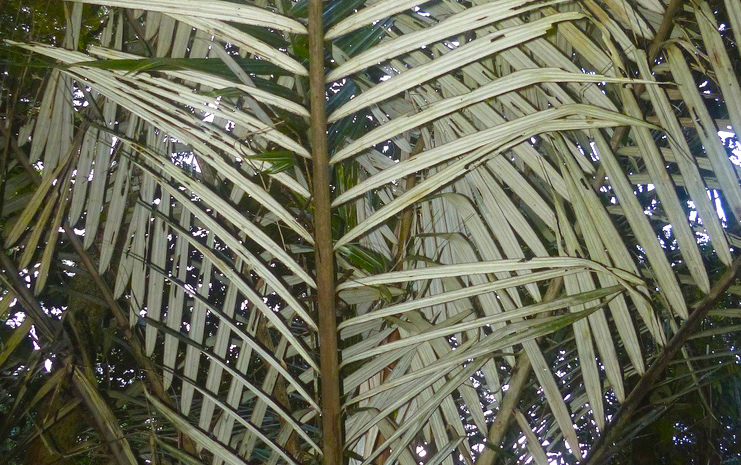
- Ravenea albicans pinnate leaves

Conservation status
- Endangered (IUCN 3.1)

Scientific classification
- Kingdom: Plantae
- Clade: Tracheophytes
- Clade: Angiosperms
- Clade: Monocots
- Clade: Commelinids
- Order: Arecales
- Family: Arecaceae
- Genus: Ravenea
- Species: R. albicans

Binomial name
- Ravenea albicans (Jum.) Beentje

Synonyms
- Louvelia albicans Jum.

= Ravenea albicans =

Species of flowering plant

Ravenea albicans is a species of flowering plant in the Arecaceae family. It is a palm endemic to northeast Madagascar and found in seven fragmented locations between the towns of Ampasimanolotra and Antalaha with the exception of one location much further south near Vondrozo. It is an endangered species threatened by habitat loss. There are perhaps 200 mature individuals remaining. In its natural range it tends to grow in humid forests within northeast Madagascar's mountain valleys. It is unique among the Ravenea genus because its pinnate leaves have an exotic, colorful appearance. Its species name, albicans, is derived from the Latin word for the color white, album, as is the word for albinism. The base of each frond is green, yet they become white to dark grey near the tip at maturity. Some individuals have completely white fronds.
