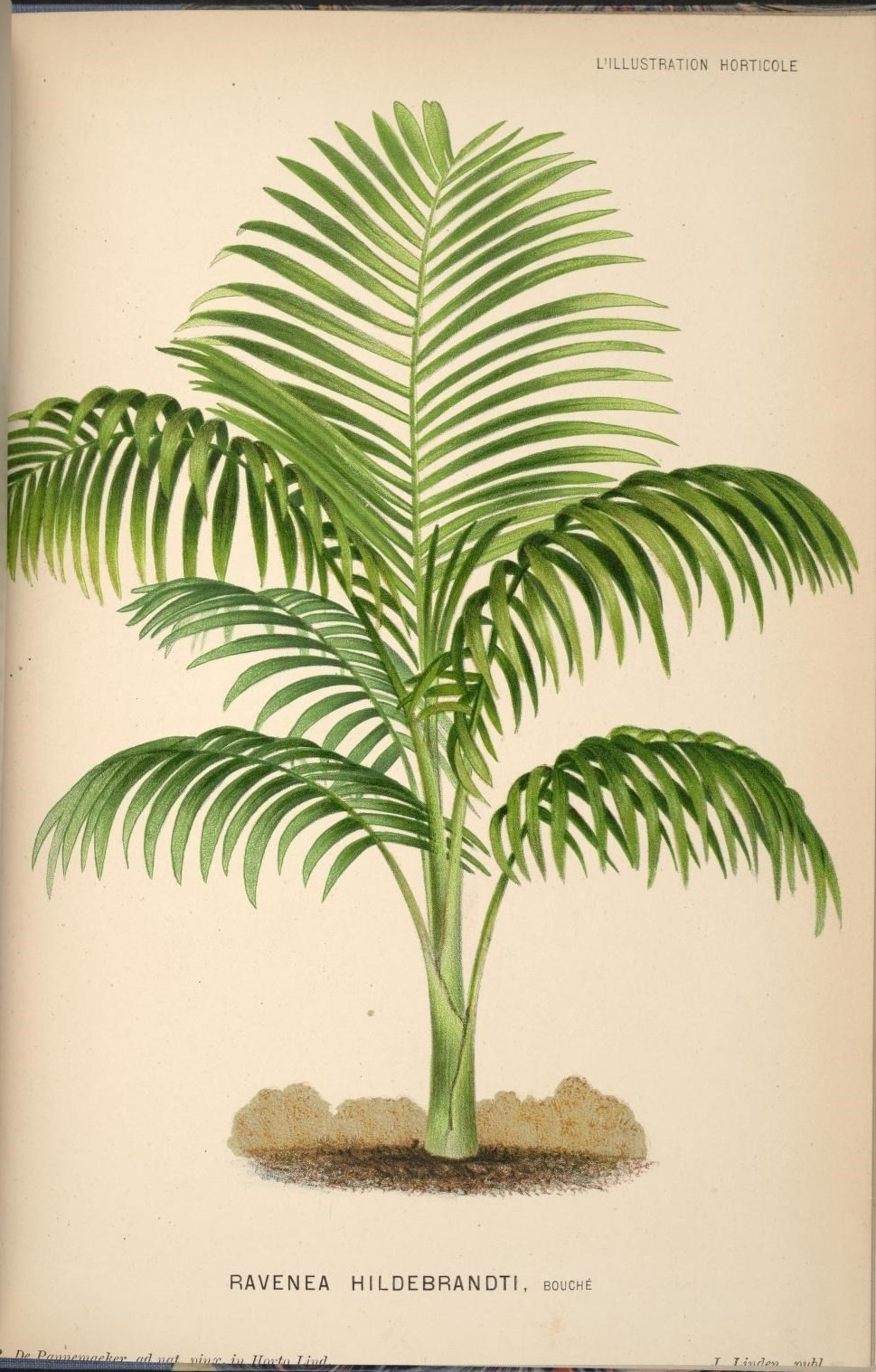

Conservation status
- Endangered (IUCN 2.3)

Scientific classification
- Kingdom: Plantae
- Clade: Tracheophytes
- Clade: Angiosperms
- Clade: Monocots
- Clade: Commelinids
- Order: Arecales
- Family: Arecaceae
- Genus: Ravenea
- Species: R. hildebrandtii

Binomial name
- Ravenea hildebrandtii H.Wendl. ex C.D.Bouché

Synonyms
- Ranevea hildebrandtii (H.Wendl. ex C.D.Bouché) L.H.Bailey

= Ravenea hildebrandtii =

Species of palm

Ravenea hildebrandtii is a species of palm tree in the family Arecaceae. It is endemic to the Comoros. It is threatened by habitat loss.
