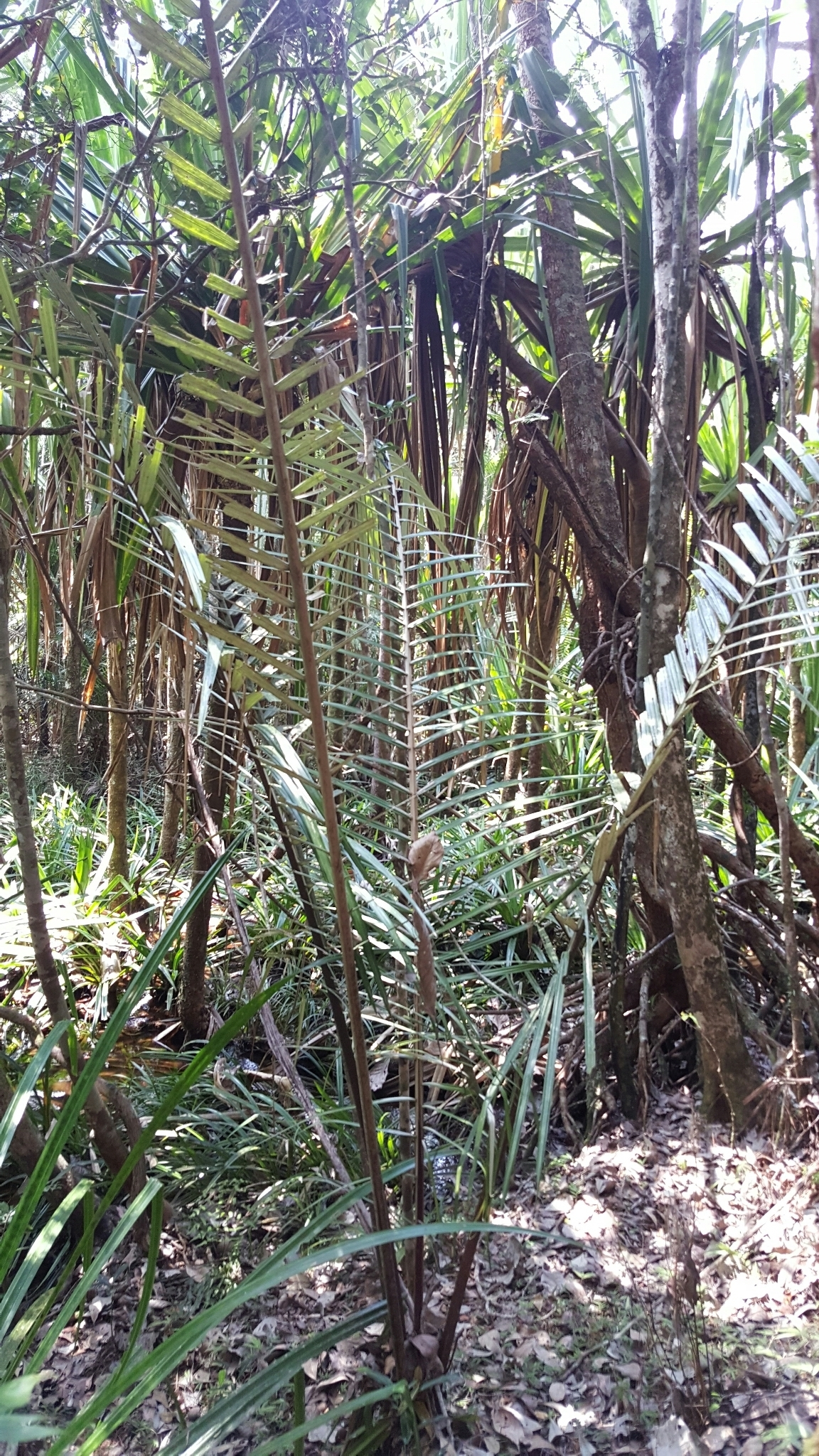

Conservation status
- Critically Endangered (IUCN 3.1)

Scientific classification
- Kingdom: Plantae
- Clade: Tracheophytes
- Clade: Angiosperms
- Clade: Monocots
- Clade: Commelinids
- Order: Arecales
- Family: Arecaceae
- Genus: Ravenea
- Species: R. hypoleuca

Binomial name
- Ravenea hypoleuca Beentje

= Ravenea hypoleuca =

Species of palm

Ravenea hypoleuca is a species of palm tree. It is endemic to Madagascar, where it grows in two locations within southeast Madagascar; One is near a town called Vondrozo and the other near Tsitongambarika. There are only about 40 mature trees known in their natural range.
