= Ravenea musicalis =

Conservation status
- Critically Endangered (IUCN 3.1)

Scientific classification
- Kingdom: Plantae
- Clade: Tracheophytes
- Clade: Angiosperms
- Clade: Monocots
- Clade: Commelinids
- Order: Arecales
- Family: Arecaceae
- Genus: Ravenea
- Species: R. musicalis

Binomial name
- Ravenea musicalis Beentje

Species of flowering plant

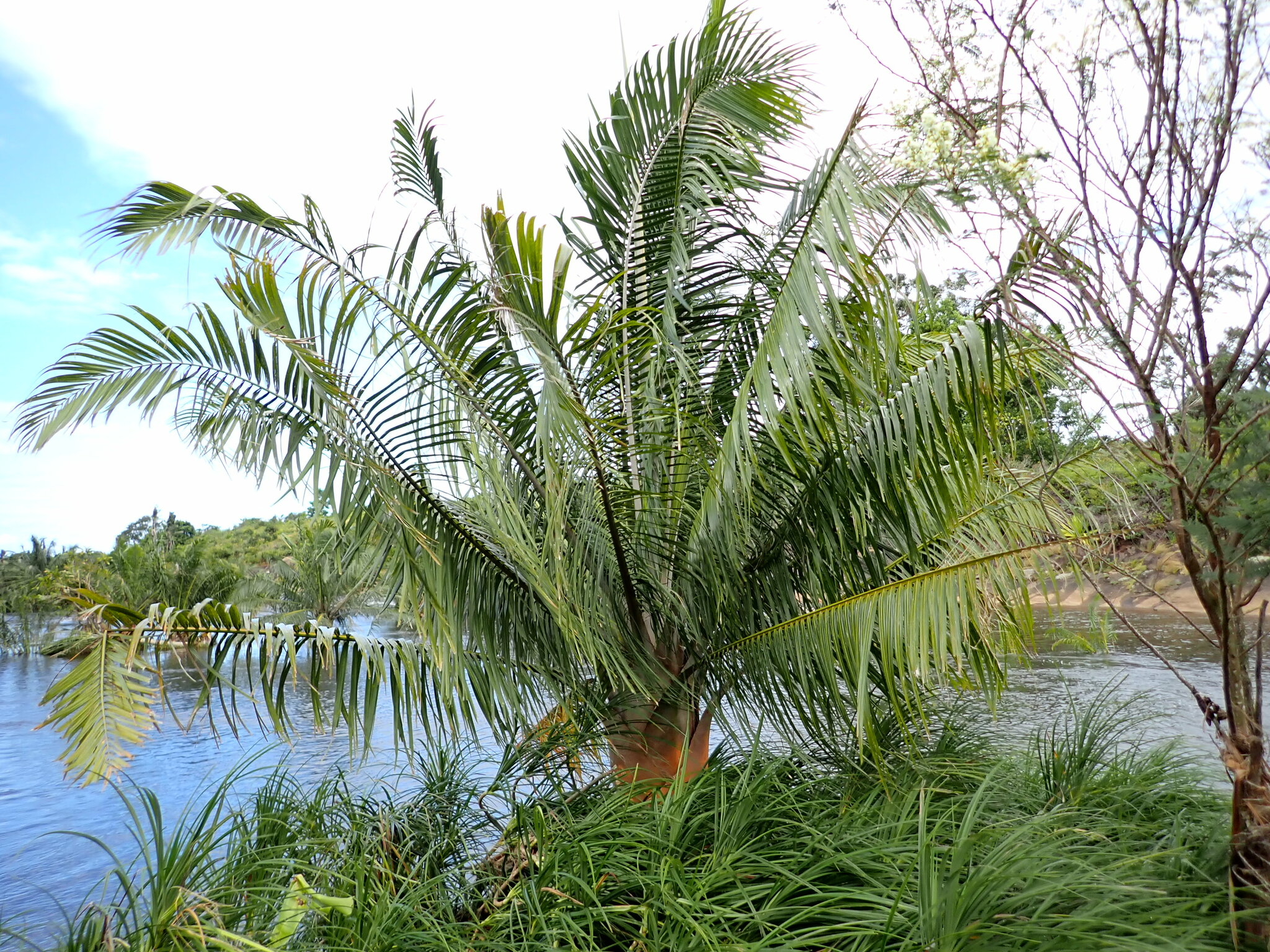
A mature ravenea musicalis in Madagascar

Ravenea musicalis, or the river palm, is a species of flowering plant in the family Arecaceae. Also known by the Antanosy word "torendriky", meaning "submerged trunk", R. musicalis is known for being the only truly aquatic palm tree. Like many mangrove trees, R. musicalis seeds germinate within the fruit, and the seedling takes root underwater, as much as 2.5 m (8 ft) below the surface, so that it spends its early years completely under water. Endemic to Madagascar, R. musicalis was first discovered in 1993 by Henk Beentje on an expedition funded by the McDonald's restaurant. although of course it was ethnoknown by the Antanosy People for centuries. This palm is listed in the IUCN Red List. This tree is harvested by local people primarily for building material and food. Over-harvesting, habitat degradation and habitat loss threaten the remaining populations. Horticulturalists prize R. musicalis for its rarity and unique life history.

== Distribution ==
Endemic to southeast Madagascar, R. musicalis has only been found to live in three populations in the Belavenoka, Vatomirindry, and Ebakika Rivers. The Area of Occupancy, a measure frequently used by the IUCN to determine conservation status, is estimated to be only 7.25 square kilometers (2.80 sq mi). Henk Beentje originally discovered the species in the Belavenoka River in 1993 during his primary expedition, while the Vatomirindry and Ebakika populations were found later in the 2000s. The Ebabkika and Belavenoka populations portray clear signs of palm tree harvesting and are dwindling at a higher rate than the remote Vatomirindry population. Ravenea musicalis does not appear to be thriving in any other location of the world.

== Habitat and ecology ==
Ravenea musicalis can be found in rivers with flowing waters that are 0.5–2.5 meters (1 ft 8 in – 8 ft 2 in) deep. It only grows to maturity on sandy river beds and seems unable to flourish on other soil types. It is adapted to warm, wet conditions, with precipitation averaging approximately 1680 mm/year and temperatures between 16 and 30 degrees Celsius. Lack of sufficient data makes the impact of R. musicalis on other species unclear. Not an ecologically dominant species, R. musicalis seems to be adapted to very specific environmental conditions.

Ravenea musicalis has a unique life history. Its reproductive cycle more closely resembles mangroves than its fellow palms. The pleonanthic palm flowers every year. R. musicalis is dioecious, and female trees develop mature fruit during the wet season, in late February. Mature, floating fruits fall into the water where they are dispersed by the river away from the parent. Within each fruit is a single seed that begins to germinate while still inside the fruit. This seed is brown before germination and has a seed coat that is 0.2 mm thick. Once germinated, the seeds develop a seed leaf that is hooked in shape. The fruit containing the germinated seed splits easily with slight disturbance. Once the fruit splits open, either by rot or collision, the seed will sink to the bottom and travel along the river floor until it catches upon a projection. The seedling will then begin to develop and take root. The seedlings will typically develop three to four leaves that increase in size as growth continues. The seedlings and the juvenile plants develop entirely underwater, their fronds remaining flaccid and flowing with the current so as to not uproot in the river current. The young palms will emerge from the water and their fronds become rigid as the trunk develops.

== Morphology ==
Mature R. musicalis range from 2.5 to 8 meters (8.2 to 26.2 ft) tall. The bottle-shaped trunk tapers down, with the broadest diameter of about 0.5 meters (1.6 ft) occurring at water level. The wood is soft and cream colored. R. musicalis is the only species in the genus Ravenea that lacks a layer of dense, hard, vertical black fibers lining the outer part of the stem, thought to benefit the structural strength of the tree.

Fourteen to sixteen pinnate ('feather-leaved') fronds emerge from the crown of the tree. They have been reported to reach up to 1.8 meters (5.9 ft) in length and have between 59 and 63 stiff leaflets, though the variation within the species can be considerable. The leaves have a tubular sheath at the base that is orange on the underside with thin, grey, tomentum. On the top, the sheath is proximally orange near the rachis of the frond, and distally green. The leaves are abaxially keeled with a glossy texture, and leaflets always occur within a single plane on either side of the rachis.

Inflorescences in the genus Ravenea are always interfoliar. R. musicalis is one of seven species in the genus observed to have apparent multiple staminate inflorescences, though, like the rest of its genus, it has solitary pistillate inflorescences. Whether or not any plants in the genus Ravenea, including R. musicalis have true multiple inflorescence or false multiple inflorescence (a condensed branch system within a single prophyll) is debated. Staminate inflorescences occur in multiples of 5 and branch to 1 order. Pistillate inflorescences are solitary and branch to 1 order.

=== Flowers and fruit ===
Ravenea musicalis is dioecious and pleonanthic, like all Ravenea species. The flowers of R. musicalis open prior to the opening of the inflorescence. Little information exists on the flowers of this species, since no known expeditions took place during flowering season.

The fruit of R. musicalis is orange and round, about 14–23 mm in diameter. Though most fruits in the genus Ravenea have a fleshy mesocarp, R. musicalis has a spongy mesocarp, allowing the fruit to float and rot. A single brown seed, which germinates within the fruit, is 10–14 mm across with a hard, black seed coat. The germinated seed has a 1 cm long hooked seed leaf, and when the seed sinks, the hook catches on the riverbed, allowing the seedling to establish itself. This of course is always downstream. None of the references deals with the issue of how the palms reached the headwaters in the first place, but birds or fruit bats are probably involved.

== Uses ==
Palm trees play a vital role in the lives of Malagasy peoples. R. musicalis is known to be harvested by local people for building materials and food. In the wet season, the wood is often used to build temporary canoes known as pirogues. In the learner dry season, the heart of the tree is harvested for edible palm hearts. This tree, like many palms, can be used for timber, fronds, and rattan. Additionally, palms like R. musicalis, can be used as a source of wax for cosmetics and be used in the kitchen in a variety of ways as source of oil, sugar, jams, heart-of-palm, etc. R. musicalis is also sought after by foreign horticulturists for their seeds due to the plant's rarity and unique life history. R. musicalis is reportedly very difficult to cultivate, since the seeds need to germinate in water, and they rot if not cleaned after collection.

== Conservation ==
An assessment done in 2012 by Rakotoarinivo and Dransfield estimated that all members of Ravenea musicalis lived in a single population of around 450 individuals within the Belavenoka River. As a result, the IUCN currently has the species listed as "Critically Endangered." However, a second expedition done in 2014 by Hogg and Henshall uncovered two additional populations of R. musicalis in the Ebakika River and the Vatomirindry River, as well as upping the estimated size of the population within the Belavenoka River. The 2014 survey counted 1797 mature individuals remaining, all located within the Belavanoka (1036 trees), Vatomirindry (726 trees), and Ebakika (35 trees) Rivers. Based on these estimates and IUCN guidelines, the Ravenea musicalis should be listed as Vulnerable, though, as Hogg and Henshall warn, extant populations could decline rapidly over the next few years in response to the increasing local human population and climate change, returning R. musicalis status to Endangered or Critically Endangered.

Much of their potential habitat occurs on ideal land for the cultivation of cassava (manioc), rice and sugar cane. Additionally, the local population of Anosy people is growing at an estimated 2.9% each year, and as their population grows, so too does their need for the rich riparian soils. Plantations occupy large swaths of the Belavenoka and Ebakika Rivers, encroaching on R. musicalis habitat. Furthermore, since R. musicalis requires sandy rather than silty riverbeds, land conversion for agriculture may be disrupting the establishment of young plants.

Already, ongoing harvesting threatens the population, especially in the more populated Ebakika and Belavenoka River areas, where R. musicalis trees were observed to have been felled, presumably for edible palm cabbage. They are threatened by logging/wood harvesting, as their wood is harvested for temporary canoes in the wet season, and the core of the tree is harvested for edible palm-hearts in the lean season. The Ebakika population suffers most from over-harvesting, and it has the lowest population.

Climate models predict that southern Madagascar will be seriously affected by a harsher dry season within the next century. The salinization process and drying-up of rivers that may result both from climate change and from agricultural practices pose a serious threat to the water-dwelling R. musicalis.
