= Ravenea latisecta =

Conservation status
- Critically Endangered (IUCN 3.1)

Scientific classification
- Kingdom: Plantae
- Clade: Tracheophytes
- Clade: Angiosperms
- Clade: Monocots
- Clade: Commelinids
- Order: Arecales
- Family: Arecaceae
- Genus: Ravenea
- Species: R. latisecta

Binomial name
- Ravenea latisecta Jum.

Species of palm

Ravenea latisecta is a species of flowering plant in the family Arecaceae.

As are most other species of palm tree in the genus Ravenea, it is threatened by habitat loss and climate change. It is native to eastern central Madagascar. Here it is known to grow in a single protected area, the Andasibe-Mantadia National Park. However biologists haven't located this species in the wild since 1992, when four mature trees were identified. Consequently, Ravenea latisecta may be extinct in the wild but recently collected data is not available to confirm nor contradict this claim. As of now, the species remains classified as critically endangered.
