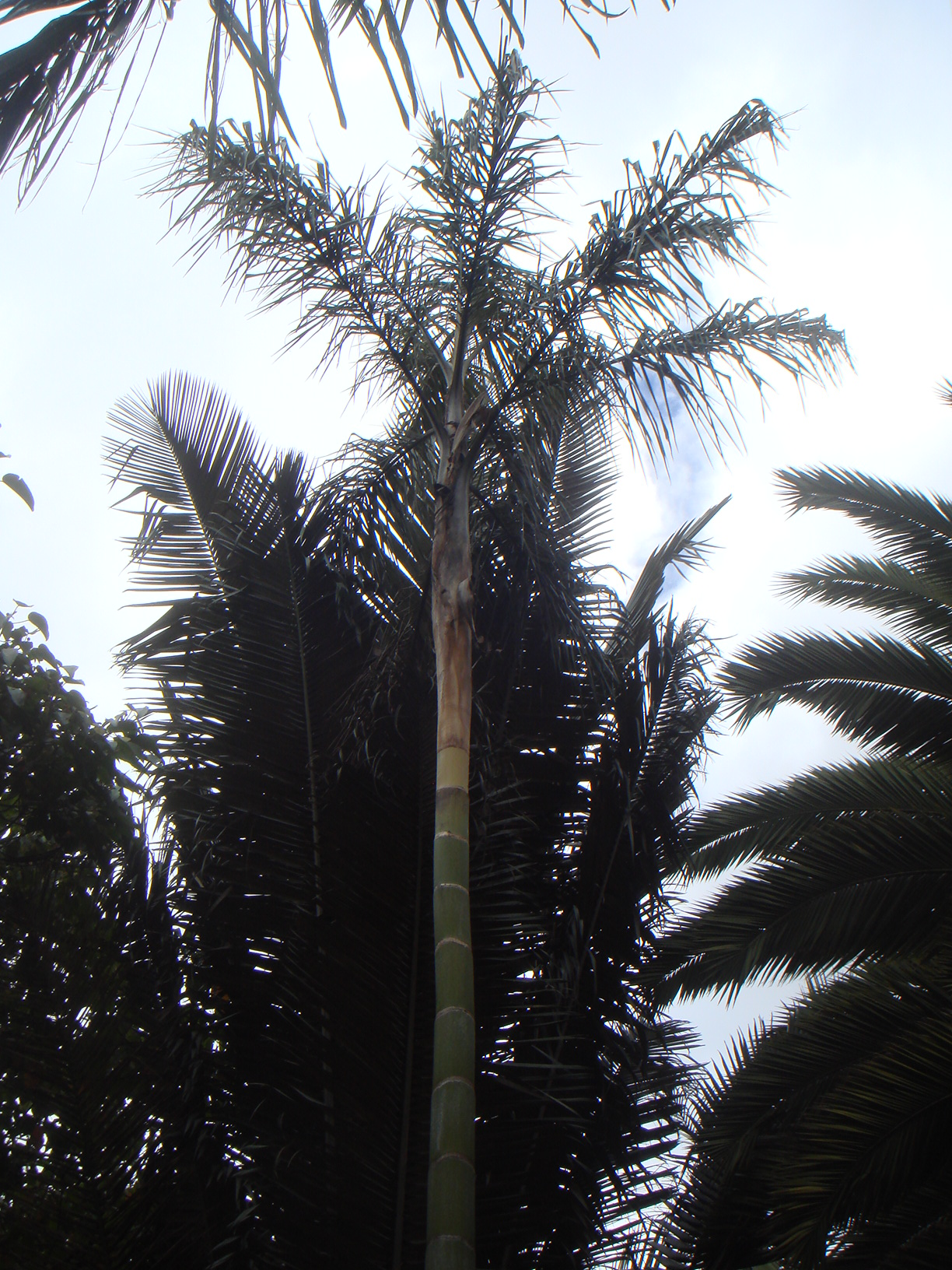
- Ceroxylon vogelianum cultivated at Bogota Botanical Garden.

Scientific classification
- Kingdom: Plantae
- Clade: Embryophytes
- Clade: Tracheophytes
- Clade: Angiosperms
- Clade: Monocots
- Clade: Commelinids
- Order: Arecales
- Family: Arecaceae
- Genus: Ceroxylon
- Species: C. vogelianum

Binomial name
- Ceroxylon vogelianum (Engel) H.Wendl.

Synonyms
- Ceroxylon coarctatum (Engel) H. Wendl.; Ceroxylon crispum Burret; Ceroxylon flexuosum Galeano & R.Bernal; Ceroxylon hexandrum Dugand; Ceroxylon verruculosum Burret; Klopstockia coarctata Engel; Klopstockia vogeliana Engel

= Ceroxylon vogelianum =

Species of palm

Ceroxylon vogelianum, also known as the Vogels wax palm, is a palm native to the Andes from Venezuela south to Peru in humid montane forest, at an elevation of 1900 – 2900 meters.

== Description ==
Ceroxylon vogelianum is a small to medium-sized palm with a stem of 3–17 meters tall and 12–25 cm in diameter. The crown can have 6 to 18 leaves, most of them almost upright or horizontally arranged. Leaf blades are made of 46–129 leaflets in a rhachis of 38–210 cm long; petiole 15–75 cm long. Male inflorescences around 160 cm long, with about 40 branches; male flowers with 6 stamens, with filaments up to 1.5 mm long and anthers 1.6–2.5 mm long. Female inflorescences around. 360 cm long with 31–53 branches; female flowers with 6 staminodes and a green pistil of 2–3 mm in diameter. Fruits globose, orange-red when ripe, 1.6–2.0 cm diam. with seeds 1.1–1.6 cm diam.

== Distribution and habitat ==
This species is present in the Andes from Venezuela to Colombia, Ecuador, and Peru. It occurs in humid montane forest, between 1900–2900 meters of elevation, with sparse individuals.
