= Ceroxylon peruvianum =

Scientific classification
- Kingdom: Plantae
- Clade: Tracheophytes
- Clade: Angiosperms
- Clade: Monocots
- Clade: Commelinids
- Order: Arecales
- Family: Arecaceae
- Genus: Ceroxylon
- Species: C. peruvianum

Binomial name
- Ceroxylon peruvianum Galeano, Sanín & Mejía

Species of palm

Ceroxylon peruvianum is a species of palm tree. It is endemic to Peru.
