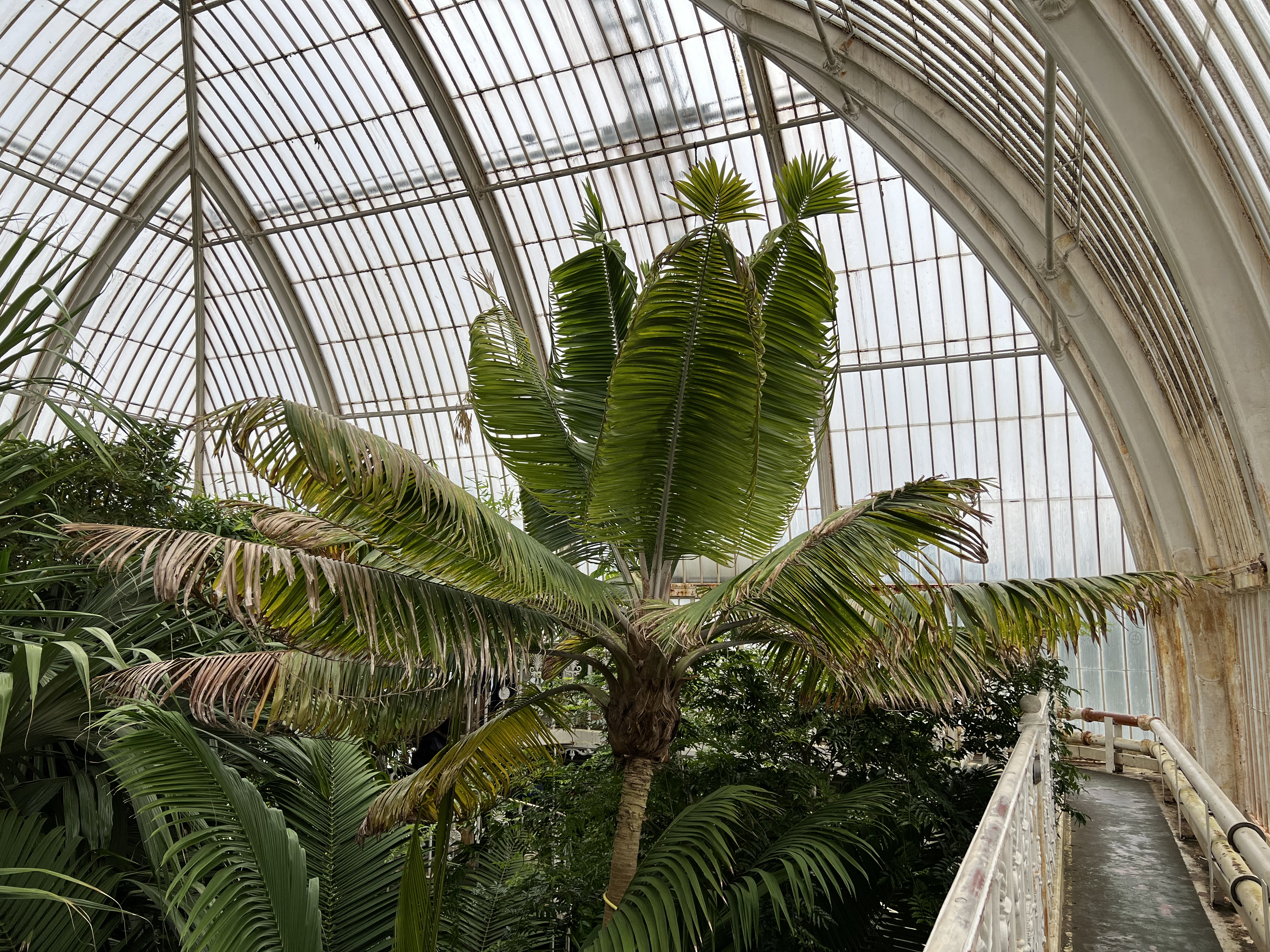

Conservation status
- Critically Endangered (IUCN 2.3)

Scientific classification
- Kingdom: Plantae
- Clade: Tracheophytes
- Clade: Angiosperms
- Clade: Monocots
- Clade: Commelinids
- Order: Arecales
- Family: Arecaceae
- Genus: Ravenea
- Species: R. moorei

Binomial name
- Ravenea moorei J.Dransf. & N.W.Uhl

= Ravenea moorei =

Species of palm

Ravenea moorei is a species of palm tree. It is endemic to the Comoros. This species is critically endangered, with only two mature specimens last noted in 1993. In 2023, a small population was found by researchers from Kew Gardens.

== Etymology ==
Ravenea moorei was named by John Dransfield and Natalie Uhl in honor of noted palm botanist Harold E. Moore.

== Description ==
Ravenea moorei grows as a tree between 15 and 20 m tall. The trunk is grey or brown, with a diameter between 11 and 35 cm across. Individuals have between 11 and 19 green leaves in its crown, each measuring between 2 and 3 m long and 70 cm across, with between 60 and 80 smaller leaflets growing from the rachis. The inflorescence resembles a brush and emerges from between the leaves. The species is dioecious.

The fruits are yellow-orange, fleshy, 16 mm in diameter and contain a spherical dark brown seed.

== Range and habitat ==
The only recorded specimens of Ravenea moorei in the wild have been found on Grande Comore, in rainforest between 700 and 1000m. Recent sightings have been on Mount Karthala.
