= Ravenea delicatula =

Conservation status
- Critically Endangered (IUCN 3.1)

Scientific classification
- Kingdom: Plantae
- Clade: Tracheophytes
- Clade: Angiosperms
- Clade: Monocots
- Clade: Commelinids
- Order: Arecales
- Family: Arecaceae
- Genus: Ravenea
- Species: R. delicatula

Binomial name
- Ravenea delicatula Beentje

Species of palm

Ravenea delicatula is a species of palm tree. It is endemic to Madagascar, where it grows in a single location in northwest Madagascar, just east of a town called Andilamena. Here, it grows in a tropical montane forest among bamboo and pandans. There are only about 30 mature trees known in their natural range.
