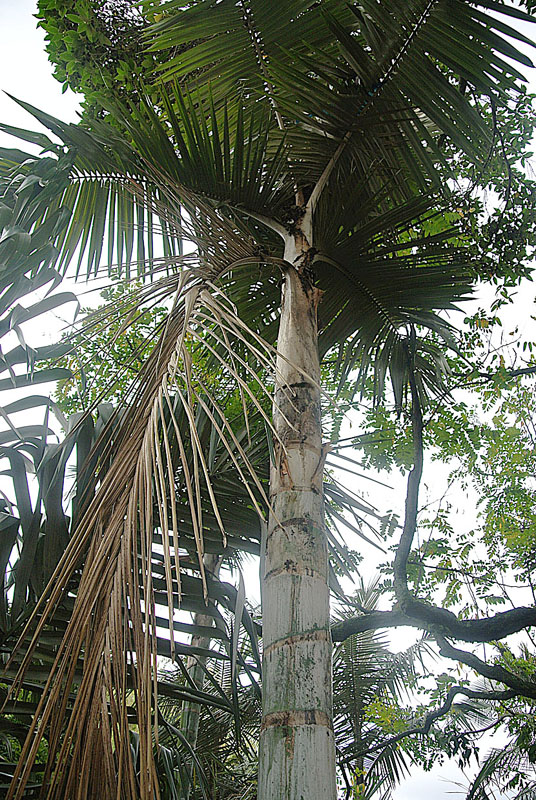

Conservation status
- Vulnerable (IUCN 3.1)

Scientific classification
- Kingdom: Plantae
- Clade: Embryophytes
- Clade: Tracheophytes
- Clade: Angiosperms
- Clade: Monocots
- Clade: Commelinids
- Order: Arecales
- Family: Arecaceae
- Genus: Ceroxylon
- Species: C. echinulatum

Binomial name
- Ceroxylon echinulatum Galeano

= Ceroxylon echinulatum =

Species of palm

Ceroxylon echinulatum, also known as the Pumbo wax palm, is a species of flowering plant in the family Arecaceae. It is found only in Ecuador and Peru. Its natural habitat is subtropical or tropical moist montane forests in the Andes. It is threatened by habitat loss.
