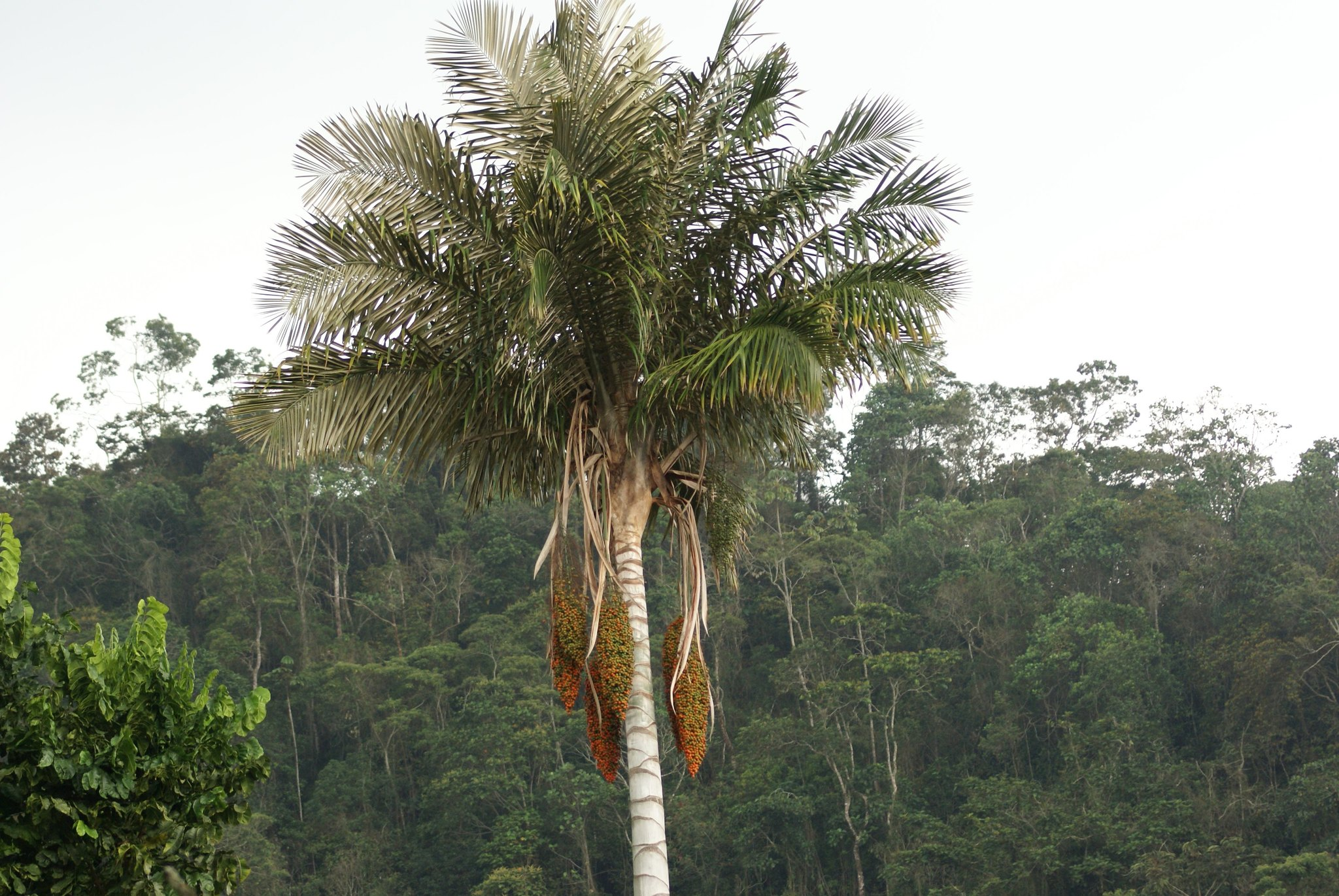

Conservation status
- Critically Endangered (IUCN 2.3)

Scientific classification
- Kingdom: Plantae
- Clade: Embryophytes
- Clade: Tracheophytes
- Clade: Angiosperms
- Clade: Monocots
- Clade: Commelinids
- Order: Arecales
- Family: Arecaceae
- Genus: Ceroxylon
- Species: C. sasaimae

Binomial name
- Ceroxylon sasaimae Galeano

= Ceroxylon sasaimae =

Species of palm

Ceroxylon sasaimae, also known as the Sasaima wax palm, is a species of flowering plant in the family Arecaceae. It is found only in Colombia. It is threatened by habitat loss.
