= Ravenea lakatra =

Conservation status
- Critically Endangered (IUCN 3.1)

Scientific classification
- Kingdom: Plantae
- Clade: Embryophytes
- Clade: Tracheophytes
- Clade: Angiosperms
- Clade: Monocots
- Clade: Commelinids
- Order: Arecales
- Family: Arecaceae
- Genus: Ravenea
- Species: R. lakatra

Binomial name
- Ravenea lakatra (Jum.) Beentje

Synonyms
- Louvelia lakatra Jum.

Species of flowering plant

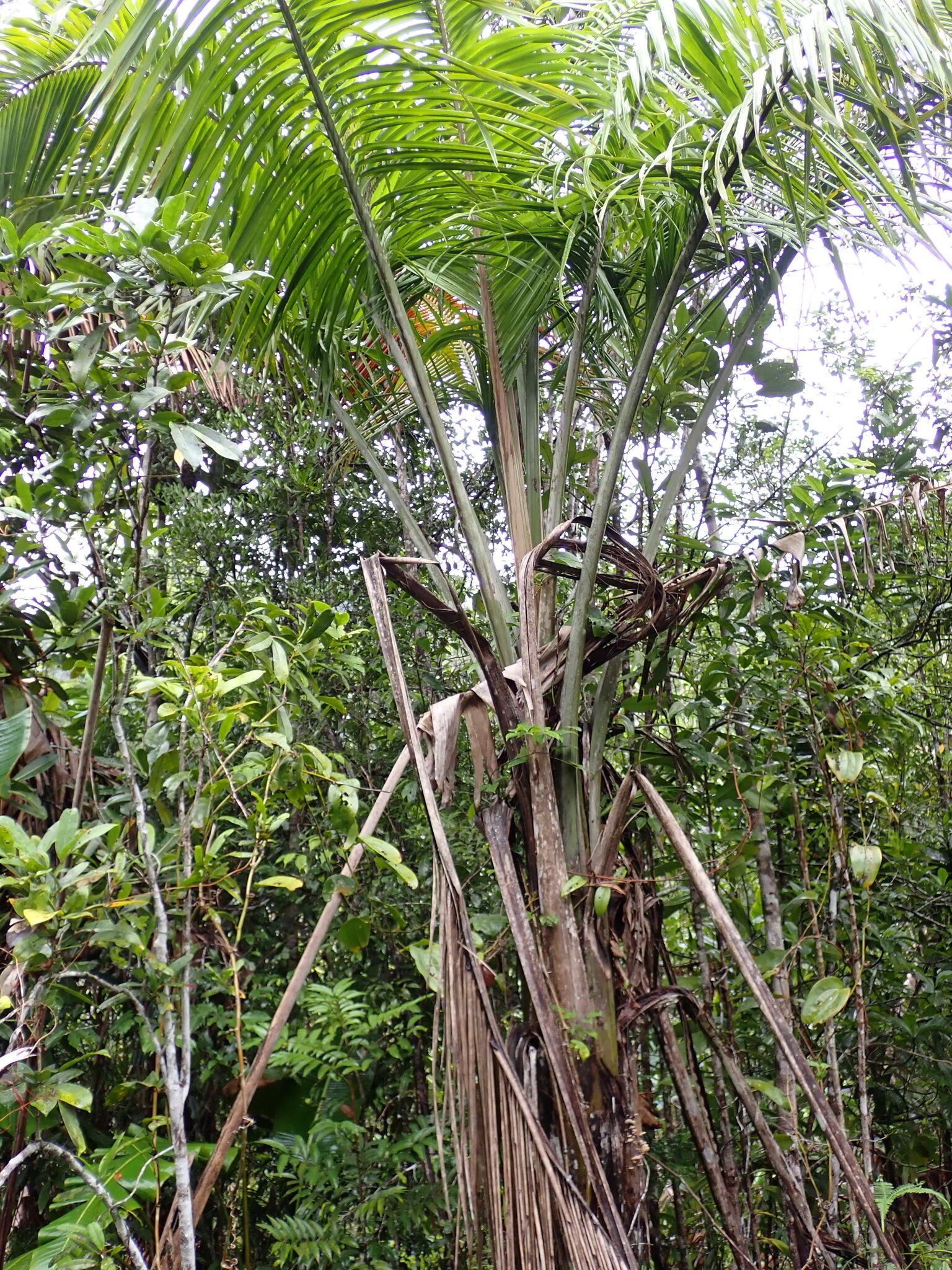
Ravenea lakatra in Madagascar

Ravenea lakatra is a species of flowering plant in the Arecaceae family. It is a palm endemic to Madagascar. It is threatened by habitat loss and overcollection. There are probably fewer than 30 mature plants remaining in the wild.
