= Ravenea sambiranensis =

Conservation status
- Least Concern (IUCN 3.1)

Scientific classification
- Kingdom: Plantae
- Clade: Tracheophytes
- Clade: Angiosperms
- Clade: Monocots
- Clade: Commelinids
- Order: Arecales
- Family: Arecaceae
- Genus: Ravenea
- Species: R. sambiranensis

Binomial name
- Ravenea sambiranensis Jum. & H.Perrier

Species of palm

Ravenea sambiranensis is a species of flowering plant in the family Arecaceae. It is found only in Madagascar. It is threatened by habitat loss.
