= Ravenea louvelii =

Conservation status
- Critically Endangered (IUCN 3.1)
- CITES Appendix II

Scientific classification
- Kingdom: Plantae
- Clade: Tracheophytes
- Clade: Angiosperms
- Clade: Monocots
- Clade: Commelinids
- Order: Arecales
- Family: Arecaceae
- Genus: Ravenea
- Species: R. louvelii

Binomial name
- Ravenea louvelii Beentje

Synonyms
- Louvelia madagascariensis Jum. & H.Perrier

Species of flowering plant

Ravenea louvelii in Madagascar

Ravenea louvelii is a species of flowering plant in the Arecaceae family. It is a palm endemic to Madagascar, where it is known from a single location. There are fewer than 10 individuals left. They are believed to be in Andasibe-Mantadia National Park on the Western margin of central Madagascar. They are protected by restriction of access to the location.
