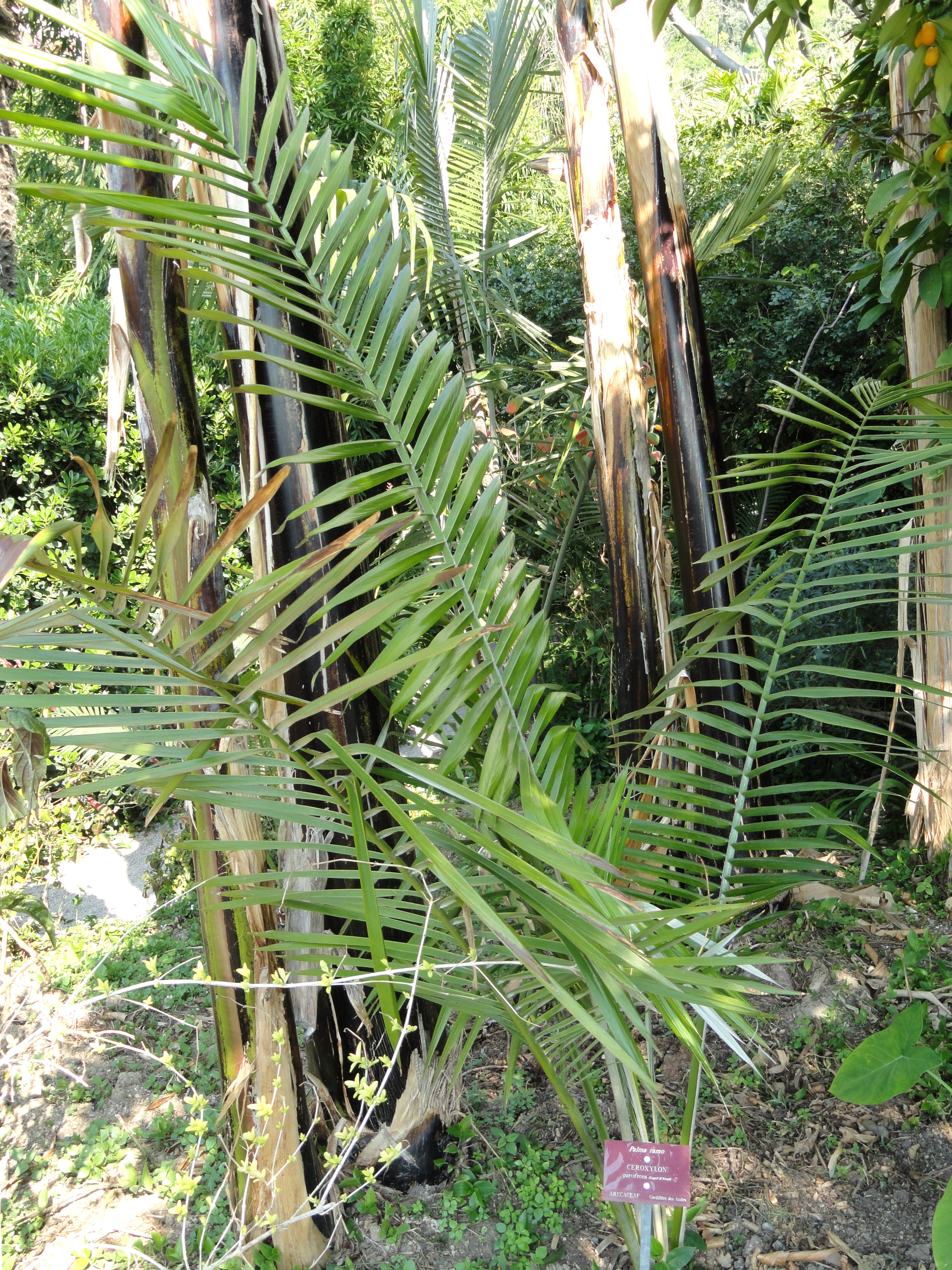

Scientific classification
- Kingdom: Plantae
- Clade: Embryophytes
- Clade: Tracheophytes
- Clade: Angiosperms
- Clade: Monocots
- Clade: Commelinids
- Order: Arecales
- Family: Arecaceae
- Genus: Ceroxylon
- Species: C. parvifrons

Binomial name
- Ceroxylon parvifrons (Engel) H.Wendl 1878

= Ceroxylon parvifrons =

Species of palm

Ceroxylon parvifrons, also known as the Golden wax palm, is a species of Ceroxylon from Colombia, Venezuela, Ecuador, Peru, and Bolivia.

== Description ==
This solitary palm can grow up to impressive heights, displaying a smooth, grayish-white trunk with distinct leaf scars. The trunk, typically cylindrical, may range from slender to more robust at the base, often with a thin layer of wax giving it a subtle sheen. The crown consists of numerous, arching pinnate leaves that create a hemispherical or funnel-like shape. Each leaf is structured with a long, slightly curved rachis bearing numerous rigid leaflets, which are dark green on the upper side and coated with a light brown to whitish wax beneath. The petiole and sheath are often covered with fine, persistent scales, adding to the textured appearance of the foliage.

Inflorescences emerge from among the leaves, gracefully curved or pendulous, and can extend up to several meters in length. These are branched multiple times, with densely arranged flowers that eventually give way to small, rounded to oblong fruits. The fruits, smooth and strikingly orange-red when mature, grow in compact clusters, contrasting beautifully with the green canopy. The surface of the rachis and leaf midribs may bear fine, hair-like scales that are more prominent on younger leaves but gradually become sparse over time. The overall structure of this palm, with its sturdy trunk and well-defined, regularly arranged foliage, gives it a distinctive and elegant profile in its natural habitat.
