= Ravenea krociana =

Conservation status
- Endangered (IUCN 3.1)

Scientific classification
- Kingdom: Plantae
- Clade: Embryophytes
- Clade: Tracheophytes
- Clade: Angiosperms
- Clade: Monocots
- Clade: Commelinids
- Order: Arecales
- Family: Arecaceae
- Genus: Ravenea
- Species: R. krociana

Binomial name
- Ravenea krociana Beentje

Species of flowering plant

Ravenea krociana is a species of flowering plant in the family Arecaceae. It is found only in Madagascar. It is threatened by habitat loss.
