= Ravenea nana =

Conservation status
- Endangered (IUCN 3.1)

Scientific classification
- Kingdom: Plantae
- Clade: Embryophytes
- Clade: Tracheophytes
- Clade: Angiosperms
- Clade: Monocots
- Clade: Commelinids
- Order: Arecales
- Family: Arecaceae
- Genus: Ravenea
- Species: R. nana

Binomial name
- Ravenea nana Beentje

Species of flowering plant

Ravenea nana is a species of flowering plant in the Arecaceae. It is a palm endemic to Madagascar. It is known from only four locations with a total population of about 100 individuals.
