= Ceroxylon parvum =

Scientific classification
- Kingdom: Plantae
- Clade: Tracheophytes
- Clade: Angiosperms
- Clade: Monocots
- Clade: Commelinids
- Order: Arecales
- Family: Arecaceae
- Genus: Ceroxylon
- Species: C. parvum

Binomial name
- Ceroxylon parvum Galeano

Species of palm

Ceroxylon parvum is a species of Ceroxylon native to the slopes of the Andes.

== Description ==
The stem reaches 2.5–6 m in height and measures 9–28 cm in diameter. It is pale or whitish near the base, gradually becoming green toward the apex, and is coated in a thin waxy layer.

The crown comprises 11 leaves arranged in a dense, rounded cluster, with senescent leaves often remaining attached and pendent. The leaf sheath is approximately 78 cm long, becoming glabrescent on the adaxial surface and bearing a deciduous covering of scales on the abaxial side. The petiole, about 10 cm long, carries indumentum similar to that of the sheath. The rachis extends to 168 cm; it is flattened along roughly half of its adaxial length and becomes nearly glabrous, while the abaxial surface retains a layer of membranous, shed scales.

Each leaf bears 102–109 pinnae per side, arranged in clusters of two to six. The lower surfaces and midribs of the pinnae are covered with small, elliptical, yellowish scales about 1 mm long, with bases 0.3–0.5 mm wide. These are organized in closely spaced, adjacent rows approximately 0.25 mm in width.

Staminate inflorescences have not been observed. Up to four pistillate inflorescences may be present simultaneously. The peduncle reaches 133 cm in length and is about 1.5 cm wide near the apex. The prophyll measures 30 cm long and 7.5 cm wide at its base. Five peduncular bracts are present, ranging from 47–155 cm in length. The rachis is about 65 cm long and supports roughly 55 lateral branches, each subtended by a thin, membranous bract 0.2–0.6 cm long. The longest branches reach 31 cm. The prophyll, peduncle, bracts, and basal portion of the rachis are covered with persistent brown lepidote indumentum, whereas the rachillae are glabrous.

Pistillate flowers have three broadly triangular, acuminate sepals, 1.0–1.5 mm long, fused for 0.6–1.0 mm, not extending to the corolla tube. The three petals are elliptical and acuminate, 5.0–6.5 mm long including a 2–3 mm acumen, and are united for 1.2–2.0 mm at the base. Staminodes number 7–11, including one antisepalous and two or three antipetalous; filaments are about 1 mm long with abortive anthers 0.9–1.2 mm in length. The pistil is green, three-lobed, and 2–3 mm in diameter.

The fruits are globose, 1–2 cm in diameter, and turn orange-red at maturity. The exocarp ranges from smooth to slightly verrucose. In fruit, the persistent perianth shows triangular-acuminate sepals 1.0–1.5 mm long, fused for 0.3–1.0 mm, with lobes that may or may not reach the corolla tube. The petals are ovate-acuminate and fused at the base for 0.3–0.7 mm, broadening toward their attachment. Each fruit contains a single seed measuring 1.0–1.2 cm in diameter. Ceroxylon parvum is the shortest species of Ceroxylon

== Distribution and habitat ==
Ceroxylon parvum grows in the eastern slopes of the Andes in Ecuador, in rainforests and clearings at altitudes of 1370 to 1740 m. A second population in southern Peru and western Bolivia was previously included in this species, but is now recognised as Ceroxylon pityrophyllum.
