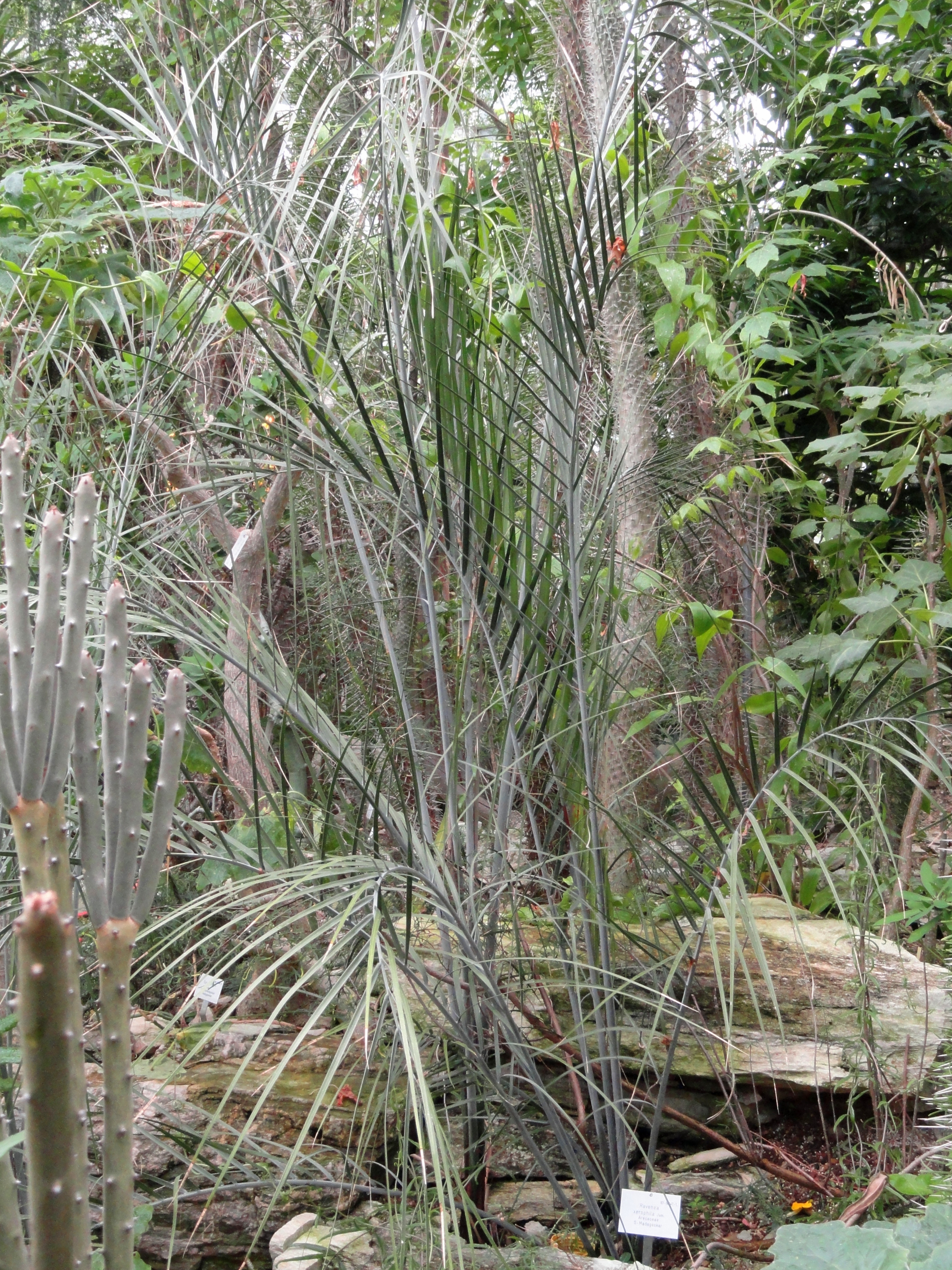

Conservation status
- Vulnerable (IUCN 3.1)

Scientific classification
- Kingdom: Plantae
- Clade: Tracheophytes
- Clade: Angiosperms
- Clade: Monocots
- Clade: Commelinids
- Order: Arecales
- Family: Arecaceae
- Genus: Ravenea
- Species: R. xerophila

Binomial name
- Ravenea xerophila Jum.

= Ravenea xerophila =

Species of palm

Ravenea xerophila is a solitary medium-sized palm in the family Arecaceae. It is found only in southern Madagascar, and is threatened by habitat loss. Trees grow from 1.5–8 meters in height, and 13–30 cm in diameter.
