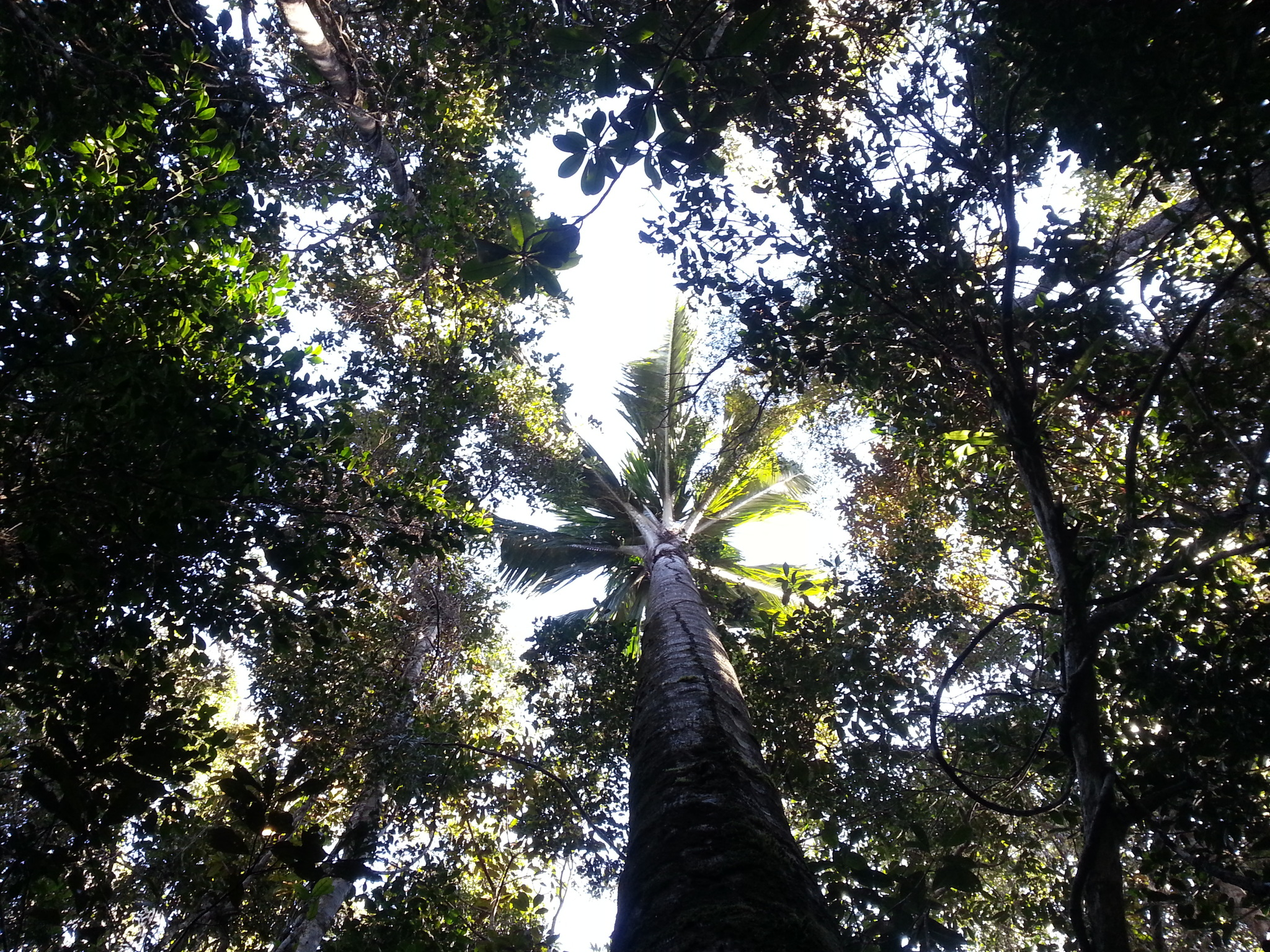
- In Andasibe-Mantidia National Park, Madagascar

Conservation status
- Near Threatened (IUCN 3.1)

Scientific classification
- Kingdom: Plantae
- Clade: Tracheophytes
- Clade: Angiosperms
- Clade: Monocots
- Clade: Commelinids
- Order: Arecales
- Family: Arecaceae
- Genus: Ravenea
- Species: R. robustior

Binomial name
- Ravenea robustior Jum. & H.Perrier

= Ravenea robustior =

Species of palm

Ravenea robustior is a species of flowering plant in the family Arecaceae. It is found only in Madagascar. It is threatened by habitat loss.
