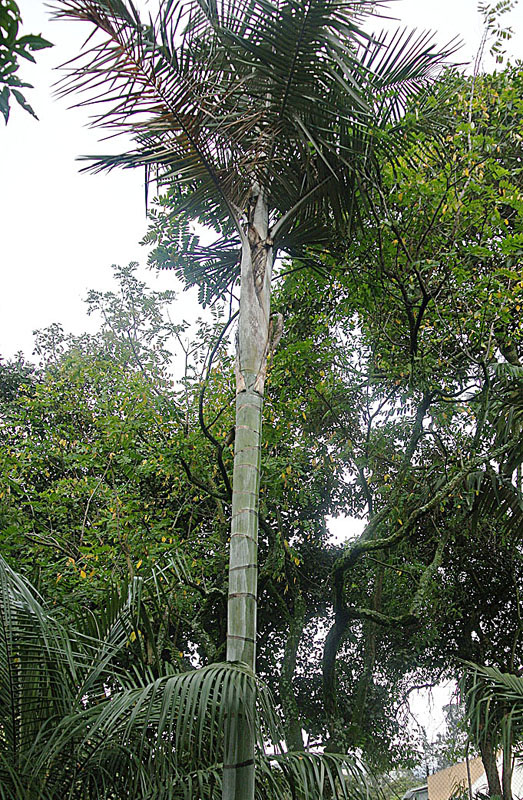

Scientific classification
- Kingdom: Plantae
- Clade: Embryophytes
- Clade: Tracheophytes
- Clade: Angiosperms
- Clade: Monocots
- Clade: Commelinids
- Order: Arecales
- Family: Arecaceae
- Genus: Ceroxylon
- Species: C. ventricosum

Binomial name
- Ceroxylon ventricosum Burret 1929

= Ceroxylon ventricosum =

Species of palm

Ceroxylon ventricosum, also known as the Ecuadorian wax palm, is a species of Ceroxylon from Colombia and Ecuador.
