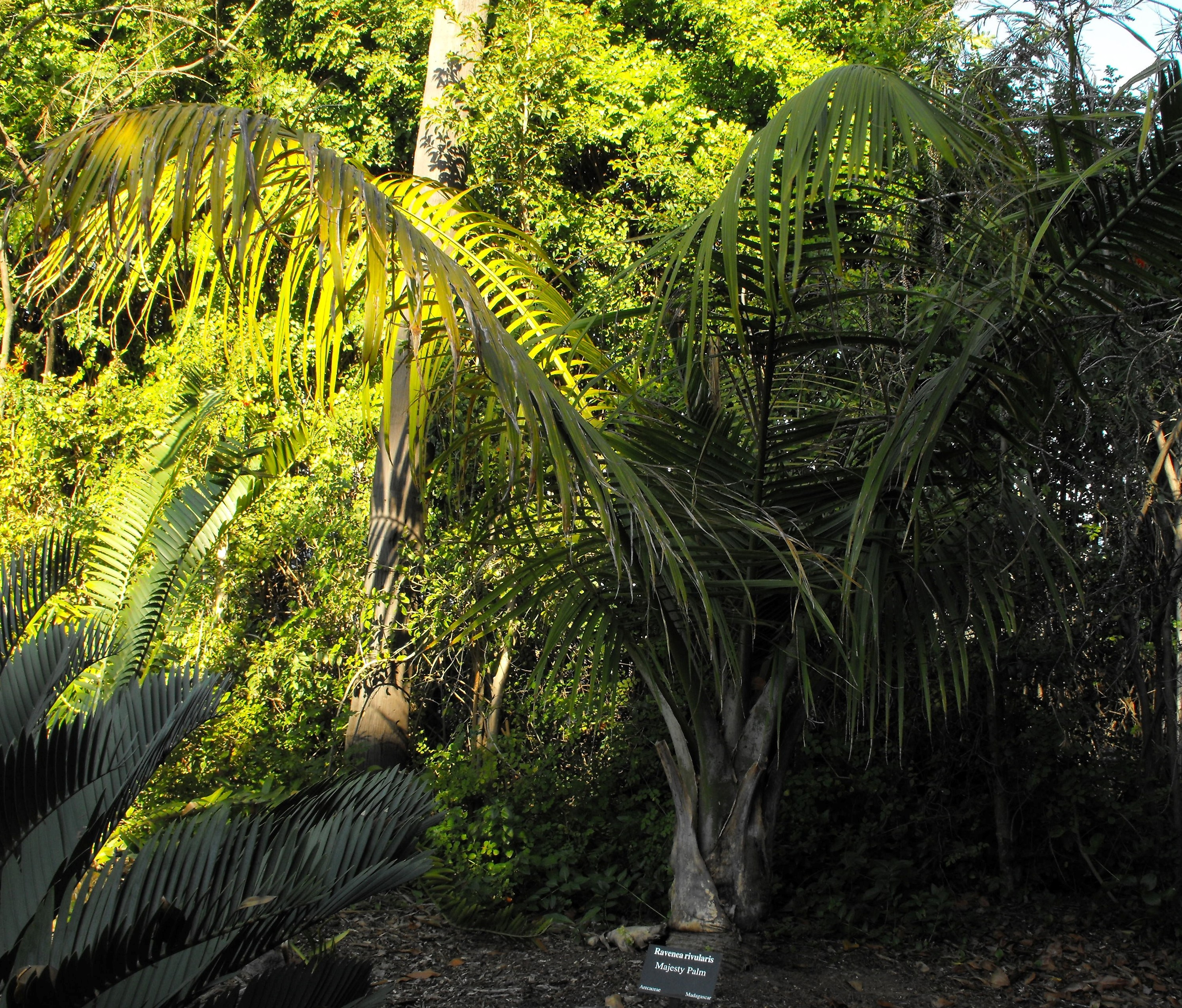

Conservation status
- Vulnerable (IUCN 3.1)
- CITES Appendix II (CITES)

Scientific classification
- Kingdom: Plantae
- Clade: Tracheophytes
- Clade: Angiosperms
- Clade: Monocots
- Clade: Commelinids
- Order: Arecales
- Family: Arecaceae
- Genus: Ravenea
- Species: R. rivularis

Binomial name
- Ravenea rivularis Jum. & H.Perrier

= Ravenea rivularis =

Species of palm

Ravenea rivularis, the majestic palm, or majesty palm, is a species of tree in the family Arecaceae. They generally grow to 10 to 12 feet tall and are often marketed in stores as a "houseplant" in a pot, in its natural state, the majesty palm may sometimes grow to 98 feet (30 meters) tall.

The palm has upward-arching leaves divided into long, thin fingers. It is native to Madagascar; however, it is believed only about 900 plants are currently alive in the wild according to an assessment conducted in 2010. The species grows in several regions of Madagascar, but because those regions are totally surrounded and separated by desert, the natural spread of the species is limited. Despite its fragility as a species in the wild, it has become a very popular houseplant due to its beautiful leaves and slow-growing nature.

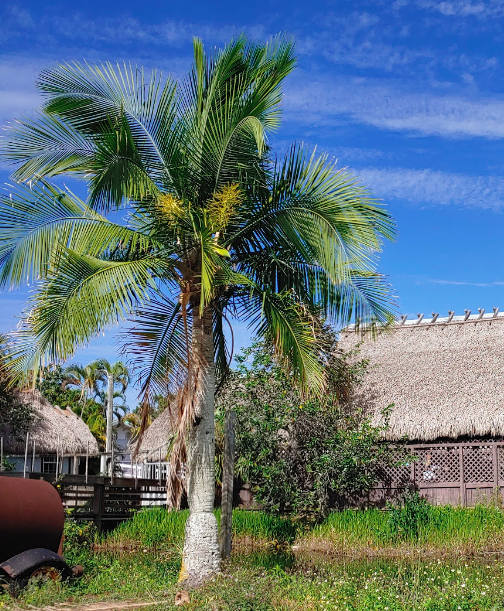
Adult Ravenea Rivularis, Florida USA

Ravenea rivularis grows in somewhat isolated humid habitats that are found in the otherwise dry, hot semi-arid climate of southwest Madagascar. Often, they grow huddled along the edges of riverbanks and natural lagoons, but also grow in shallow swamps where they receive ample water and humidity year-round. Due to its love for warm, moist air which can be difficult to provide consistently in most homes, the most common problem affecting those kept as houseplants is browning leaf tips. To replicate its natural growing conditions, plants should be misted with warm water daily or kept near a humidifier. It should also be watered more frequently than average houseplants especially in the spring and summer. That being said, fast-draining soil is preferable, such as soil labeled for cacti, in a well-draining container to allow water to seep through the root system and out of the pot. Although they can also suffer from lack of sunlight, Ravenea rivularis is much more sensitive to lack of water and humidity.

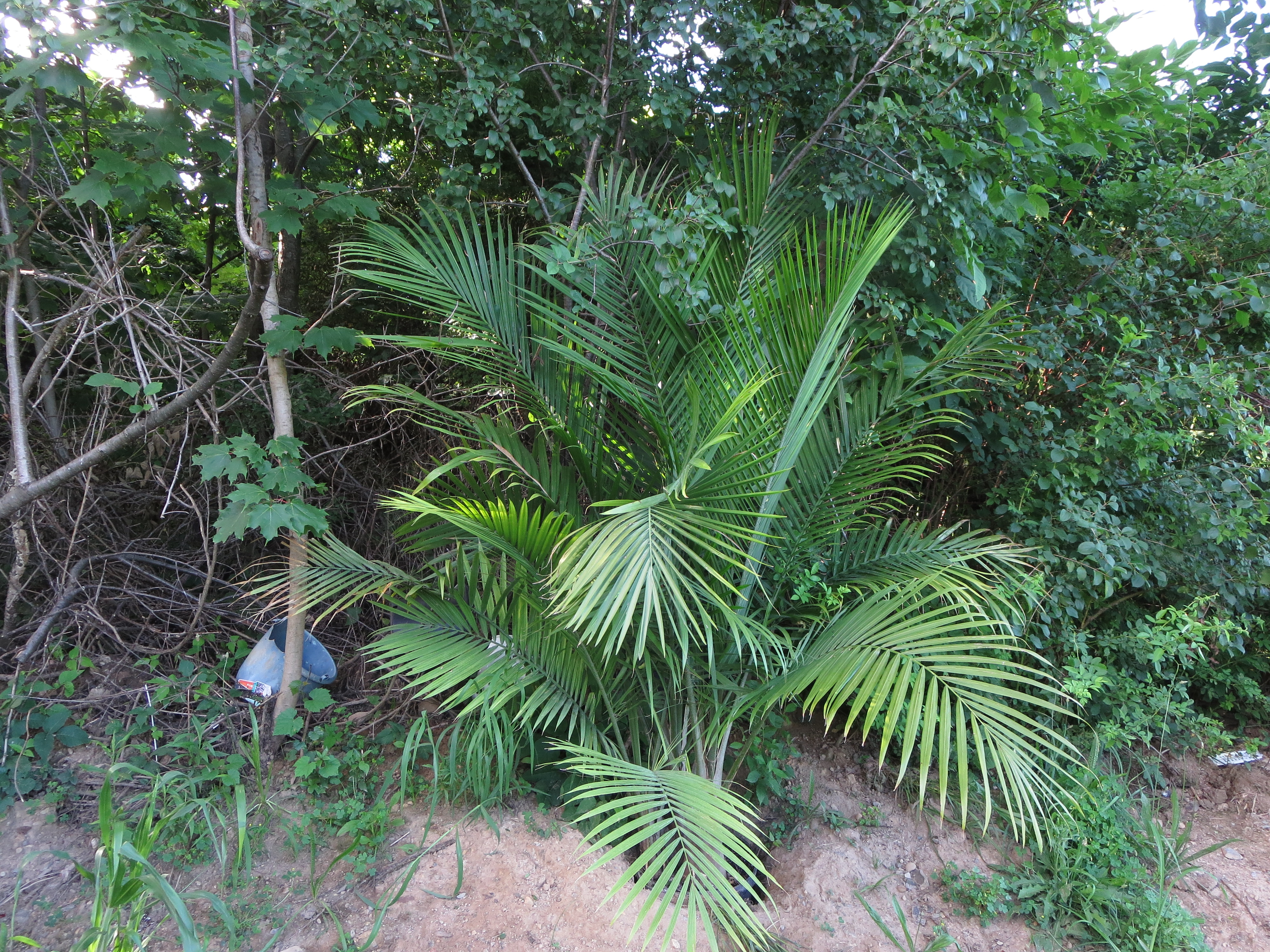
Majesty palms are often sold as cheap lush tropical foliage house plants but are hard to take care of for long term survivability.

In addition to ample water, Ravenea rivularis kept as a houseplant requires specialty fertilizer for palm trees which contains more magnesium than all-purpose fertilizers. Slow-release palm fertilizer with an NPK ratio of about 8-2-12 with at least 4% magnesium is ideal. A pinch of epsom salt may also be used as an alternative source of magnesium.
