= Ravenea julietiae =

Conservation status
- Endangered (IUCN 3.1)

Scientific classification
- Kingdom: Plantae
- Clade: Embryophytes
- Clade: Tracheophytes
- Clade: Angiosperms
- Clade: Monocots
- Clade: Commelinids
- Order: Arecales
- Family: Arecaceae
- Genus: Ravenea
- Species: R. julietiae

Binomial name
- Ravenea julietiae Beentje

Species of flowering plant

Ravenea julietiae is a species of flowering plant in the Arecaceae family. It is a palm endemic to Madagascar. It is threatened by habitat loss, and there are perhaps 80 mature individuals remaining in the wild.
