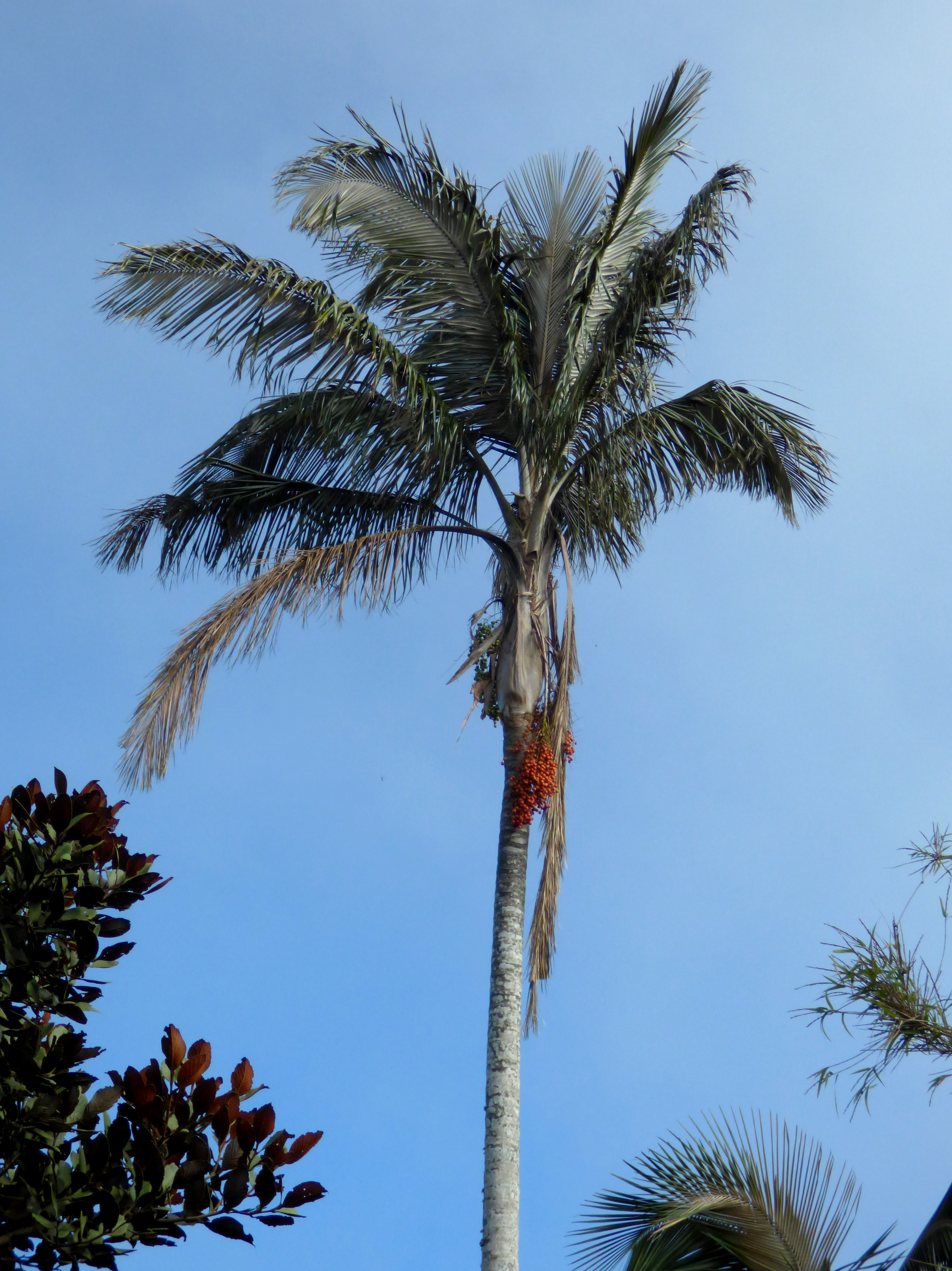

Conservation status
- Vulnerable (IUCN 3.1)

Scientific classification
- Kingdom: Plantae
- Clade: Tracheophytes
- Clade: Angiosperms
- Clade: Monocots
- Clade: Commelinids
- Order: Arecales
- Family: Arecaceae
- Genus: Ceroxylon
- Species: C. ceriferum

Binomial name
- Ceroxylon ceriferum (H.Karst.) Pittier

Synonyms
- Ceroxylon klopstockia Mart.; Iriartea klopstockia W.Watson; Klopstockia cerifera H.Karst.; Beethovenia cerifera Engel; Ceroxylon beethovenia Burret; Ceroxylon interruptum (H.Karst.) H.Wendl.; Ceroxylon schultzei Burret; Iriartea nivea W.Watson; Klopstockia interrupta H.Karst.

= Ceroxylon ceriferum =

Species of palm

Ceroxylon ceriferum, also known as the Sacred wax palm, is a species of flowering plant in the family Arecaceae. It grows from northern Colombia and Venezuela.

== Habitat ==
C. ceriferum is a rainforest species growing at altitudes of 1800 to 2700 m.
