= Carl David Bouché =

German botanist and gardener (1809–1881)

- Born: 4 June 1809
- Died: 27 September 1881 (aged 72)
- Citizenship: German
- Education: Washington University in St. Louis
- Scientific career
- Fields: Botany

Carl David Bouché (4 June 1809 – 27 September 1881) was a German botanist and gardener. He served as Inspector (technical director) of the Royal Botanic Garden in Berlin from 1843 to 1881.

Bouché described 107 plant species.

Bouché was a member of a prominent family of botanists and gardeners. His grandfather, Jean David Bouché (1747–1819), a Berlin nurseryman of French origin, installed glasshouses which became popular with the Prussian nobility. His uncle, Peter Friedrich Bouché (1785–1856), and father Peter Karl Bouché (1783–1856) continued the business. Peter Karl was also a student of Carl Ludwig Willdenow.
