= Vondrozo =

- Location in Madagascar
- Coordinates: 22°49′14″S 47°19′18″E
- Country: Madagascar
- Region: Atsimo-Atsinanana
- District: Vondrozo
- Elevation: 437 m (1,434 ft)

Population (2001)
  - Total: 10,000
- Time zone: UTC3 (EAT)
- Postal code: 322

Vondrozo is a rural municipality in Madagascar. It belongs to the district of Vondrozo, which is a part of Atsimo-Atsinanana Region. The population of the commune was estimated to be approximately 10,000 in 2001 commune census.

In addition to primary schooling the town offers secondary education at both junior and senior levels. The town provides access to hospital services to its citizens. The majority 97% of the population of the commune are farmers. The most important crops are coffee and pepper, while other important agricultural products are cassava and rice. Services provide employment for 3% of the population.

== Roads ==
This municipality is crossed by the unpaved National road 27 from Ihosy (206 km) to Farafangana (66km).
