= Ceroxylon amazonicum =

Conservation status
- Endangered (IUCN 3.1)

Scientific classification
- Kingdom: Plantae
- Clade: Tracheophytes
- Clade: Angiosperms
- Clade: Monocots
- Clade: Commelinids
- Order: Arecales
- Family: Arecaceae
- Genus: Ceroxylon
- Species: C. amazonicum

Binomial name
- Ceroxylon amazonicum Galeano

Species of palm

Ceroxylon amazonicum is a species of palm tree. It is endemic to Ecuador. There are only four known populations. The species is threatened by deforestation.
