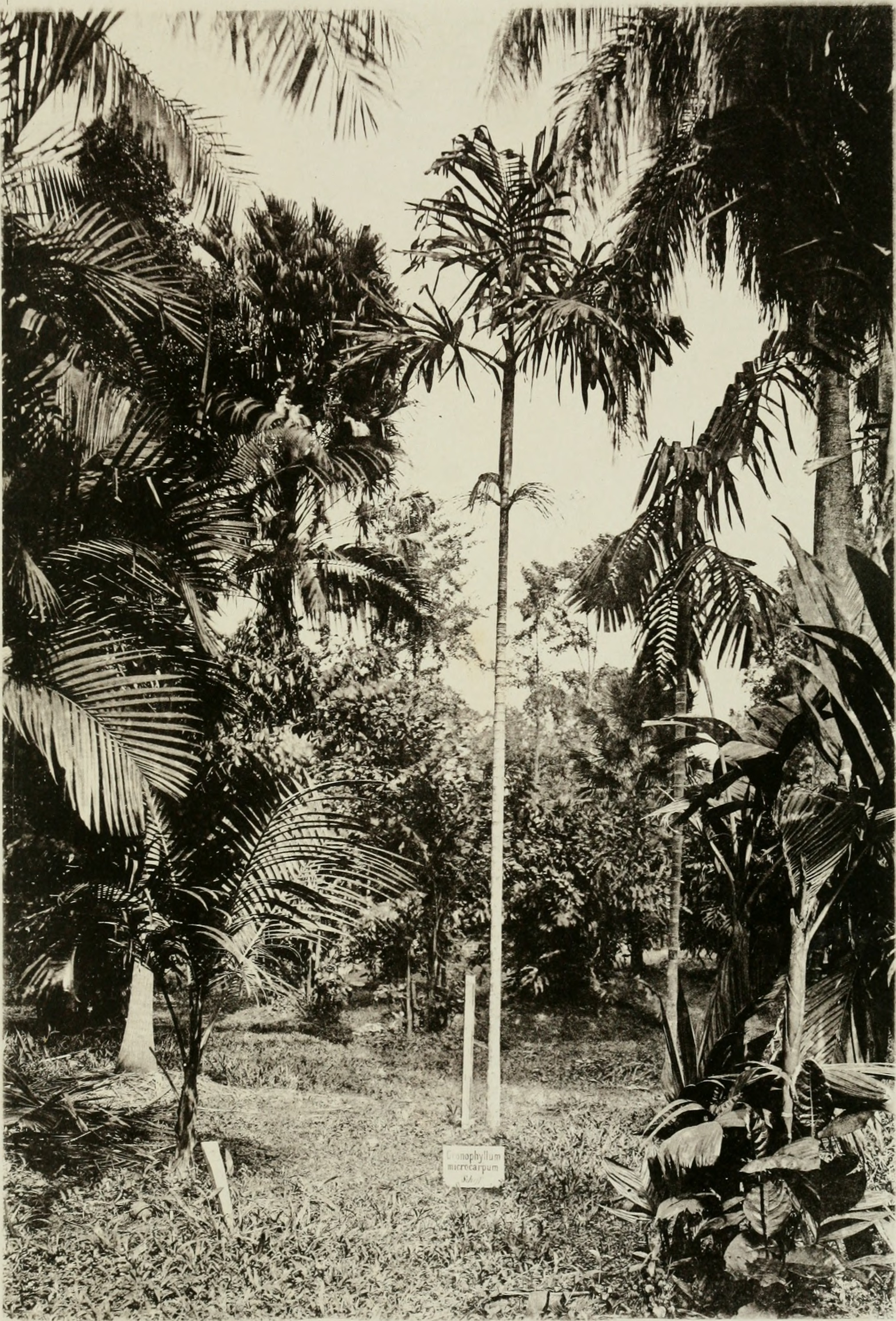

Scientific classification
- Kingdom: Plantae
- Clade: Tracheophytes
- Clade: Angiosperms
- Clade: Monocots
- Clade: Commelinids
- Order: Arecales
- Family: Arecaceae
- Genus: Hydriastele
- Species: H. microcarpa

Binomial name
- Hydriastele microcarpa (Scheff.) W.J.Baker & Loo

Synonyms
- Gronophyllum microcarpum Scheff.

= Hydriastele microcarpa =

Species of palm

Hydriastele microcarpa is a species of flowering plant in the family Arecaceae. It is endemic to the island of Seram in the Maluku Islands of Indonesia.
