= Inhambanella henriquesii =

Scientific classification
- Kingdom: Plantae
- Clade: Tracheophytes
- Clade: Angiosperms
- Clade: Eudicots
- Clade: Asterids
- Order: Ericales
- Family: Sapotaceae
- Subfamily: Sapotoideae
- Genus: Inhambanella
- Species: I. henriquesii

Binomial name
- Inhambanella henriquesii (Engl. & Warb.) Dubard (1915)

Synonyms
- Lecomtedoxa henriquesii (Engl. & Warb.) A.Meeuse (1960); Mimusops henriquesii Engl. & Warb. (1904)

Species of flowering plant

Inhambanella henriquesii, commonly known as milk pear, milk-pear, or milkpear in English, melkpeer in Afrikaans, and umbenkela or umthungulu in Zulu, is a species of flowering plant in the pea family, Fabaceae. It is a tree native to eastern Africa, ranging from Kenya to Kwazulu-Natal Province of South Africa.

It is a medium-sized evergreen tree, growing up to 25 meters tall. Young leaves are brilliant coppery–red in color, maturing to green. The bark is dark brown or grey, exuding copious amounts of white latex when cut. Fruits are red when mature, 2 to 4 cm in diameter, subglobose or ellipsoid in shape, with an edible pulp. Seeds are up to 3 cm long.

It grows in the coastal forests of Kenya, Tanzania, Mozambique, and KwaZulu-Natal, extending up river valleys into the drier interior as far as southern Malawi and Zimbabwe, from sea level up to 300 meters elevation.

The species was first described as Mimusops henriquesii in 1904 by Adolf Engler and Otto Warburg. The species epithet is named for Julio Augusto Henriques, a Portuguese botanist and plant collector. In 1915 Marcel Dubard placed it in the newly described genus Inhambanella as Inhambanella henriquesii.
