= Inhambanella =

Scientific classification
- Kingdom: Plantae
- Clade: Tracheophytes
- Clade: Angiosperms
- Clade: Eudicots
- Clade: Asterids
- Order: Ericales
- Family: Sapotaceae
- Subfamily: Sapotoideae
- Genus: Inhambanella (Engl.) Dubard

Synonyms
- Mimusops sect. Inhambanella Engl.; Kantou Aubrév. & Pellegr.

Genus of trees

Inhambanella is a group of trees in the Sapotaceae described as a genus in 1915.

The genus is native to Africa.

Species

- Inhambanella guereensis (Aubrév. & Pellegr.) T.D.Penn. - Ivory Coast, Liberia
- Inhambanella henriquesii (Engl. & Warb.) Dubard - Kenya, Tanzania, Malawi, Zimbabwe, Mozambique, KwaZulu-Natal

Formerly included

- Inhambanella natalensis (Schinz) Dubard, synonym of Vitellariopsis marginata (N.E.Br.) Aubrév.

The genus is named for Inhambane, a coastal town in Mozambique.
