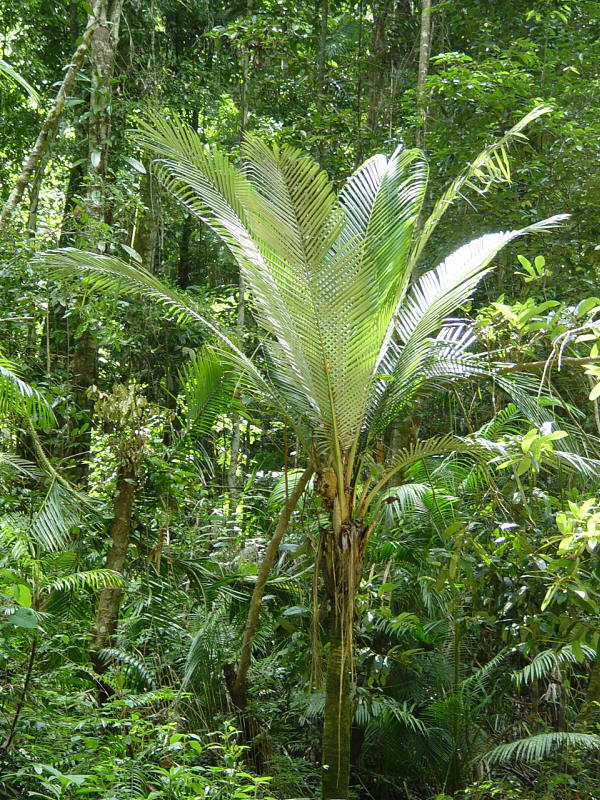

Conservation status
- Least Concern (NCA)

Scientific classification
- Kingdom: Plantae
- Clade: Embryophytes
- Clade: Tracheophytes
- Clade: Spermatophytes
- Clade: Angiosperms
- Clade: Monocots
- Clade: Commelinids
- Order: Arecales
- Family: Arecaceae
- Subfamily: Ceroxyloideae
- Tribe: Ceroxyleae
- Genus: Oraniopsis (Becc.) J. Dransf., A.K.Irvine & N.W.Uhl
- Species: O. appendiculata

Binomial name
- Oraniopsis appendiculata (F.M.Bailey) J.Dransf., A.K.Irvine & N.W.Uhl
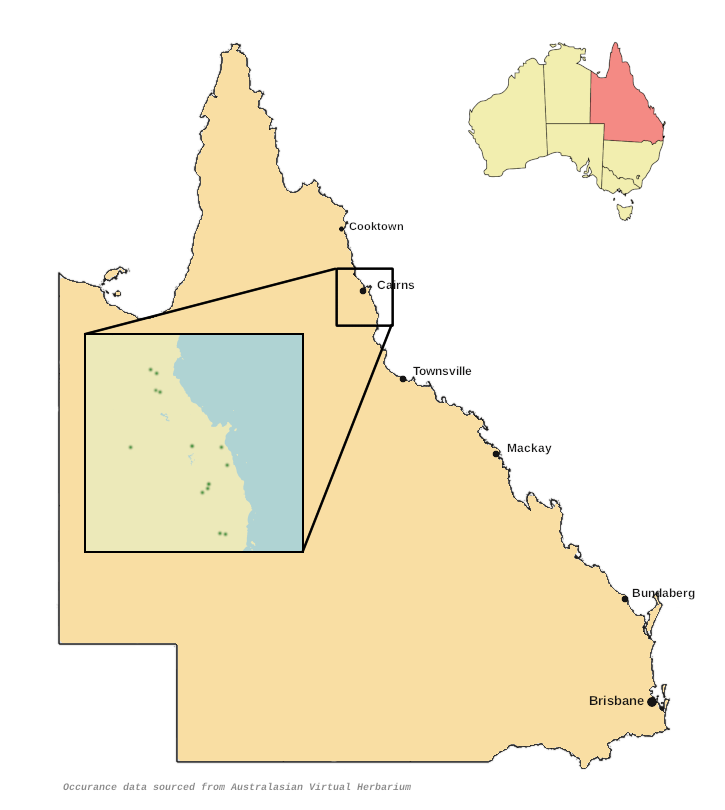

Synonyms
- Areca appendiculata F.M.Bailey; Orania appendiculata (F.M.Bailey) Domin; Orania beccarii F.M.Bailey

= Oraniopsis =

Genus of flowering plants

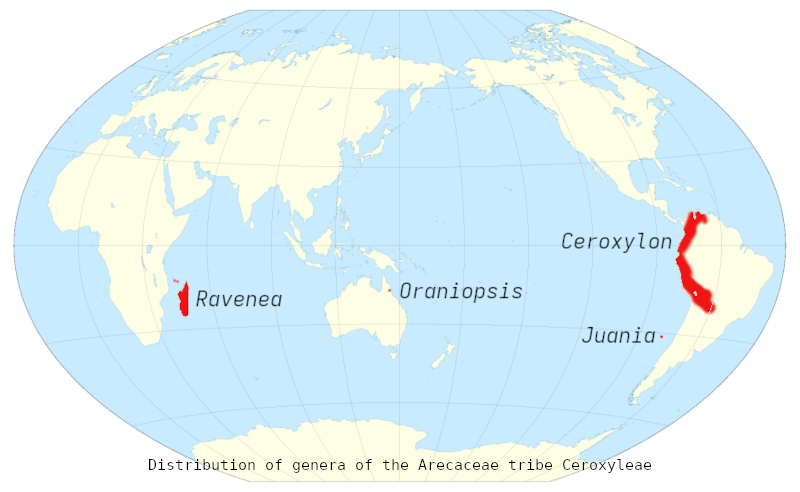
Distribution of the Arecaceae tribe Ceroxyleae to which Oraniopsis belongs

Oraniopsis is a genus of flowering plant in the palm family Arecaceae that is endemic to Queensland, Australia. It contains only one species, Oraniopsis appendiculata, commonly known as grey palm or Orania palm. It is a very slow-growing tree restricted to mountain rainforest in the Wet Tropics bioregion. It was first described in 1891 and its closest relatives occur in Madagascar and South America.

== Description ==
=== Stem and foliage ===
Oraniopsis appendiculata is a solitary, feather-leaved palm with a trunk up to 20 m (66 ft) tall and 45 cm (18 in) diameter. The trunk is grey or grey-green and bears prominent leaf scars. Eight to fifteen leaves make up the large spreading crown, each up to 6 m (20 ft) long and having 80–110 pairs of leaflets. The leaflets are dark green above and may be silvery grey or bronze underneath, and the midrib forms a prominent ridge on the upper surface. The fronds are more or less erect, and a few dead fronds may remain attached to the tree for some time, hanging beside the trunk.

=== Flowers ===
The inflorescence emerges from within the crown. It is up to 120 cm (47 in) long with a peduncle (stem) about 75 cm (30 in) long. This species is dioecious, meaning that male and female flowers are borne on separate plants. Flowers of the two sexes are similar; they are cream, have three sepals about 1 mm (0.04 in) long and three petals about 6 mm (0.24 in) long. On the inner face of the petals there is a conspicuous gland or process. In the male flowers there are six stamens which are a little longer than the petals. The female flowers have six staminodes (sterile stamens), and a three-lobed ovary about 3 mm (0.12 in) wide and 2 mm (0.08 in) tall.

=== Fruit ===
The fruits are yellow-orange drupes, more or less spherical in shape, measuring up to 4 cm (1.6 in) diameter. They contain a single seed surrounded by about 3 mm (0.12 in) of white pulp.

== Taxonomy ==
This species was first described as Areca appendiculata in 1891 by Australian botanist Frederick Manson Bailey. The description was based on specimens in poor condition which were collected during an expedition to the summit of Mount Bellenden Ker in 1889. Bailey wrote that the specimens resemble Hydriastele wendlandiana but that he "thought it advisable to keep it under Areca for the present, hoping to receive better specimens".

In 1915, Czech botanist Karel Domin transferred the species to Orania. In 1985, Dransfield et al. erected the new genus Oraniopsis and transferred the species to it.

=== Phylogeny ===
Within the Arecaceae, Oraniopsis is placed in the subfamily Ceroxyloideae and tribe Ceroxyleae. The other members of the tribe are Ravenea in Madagascar and the South American genera Juania and Ceroxylon, which together represent a very wide disjunction. When placing the Orania palm in this group in 1985, Dransfield et al. were uncertain of the process by which this disjunction came about. More recent research leans toward long distance dispersal as a more likely cause than vicariance.

=== Etymology ===
The generic name Oraniopsis is derived from the plant's earlier placement in the genus Orania, combined with the suffix -opsis 'similar to', recognising that the plant is superficially similar to Orania. The species epithet apendiculata is a reference to the appendage on the inner face of the petals.

=== Common names ===
This species is commonly referred to as grey palm or Orania palm.

== Distribution and habitat ==
O. apendiculata grows as an understory tree in well-developed rainforest, from the Walter Hill Range near Tully, northwards to Mount Spurgeon in the Mount Lewis National Park, and on the Atherton Tableland. It is found in creek beds and close to creeks, in very wet forests with annual rainfall totals of over 1,800 mm (70 in), usually on soils based on granite or metamorphics. The altitudinal range is from 80 to 1,600 m (260 to 5,250 ft), but it is rare beneath about 400 m (1,300 ft).

== Conservation status ==
This species is listed as least concern under the Queensland Government's Nature Conservation Act. The government's Wildnet website, which lists the statuses of Queensland's flora and fauna, does not provide any information on the reasoning for the assessment. As of July 2026, it has not been assessed by the International Union for Conservation of Nature.

== Cultivation ==
Seed germination is a lengthy process, to a year or more, with some seeds resisting germination to four years. Cracking the shell might assist the process, but it has been shown that bottom heat is ineffective. The grey palm is exceptionally slow-growing – after germination it remains as a stemless rosette of fronds for up to 30 years before a trunk develops. It is thought that tall specimens may be hundreds of years old.

== Gallery ==
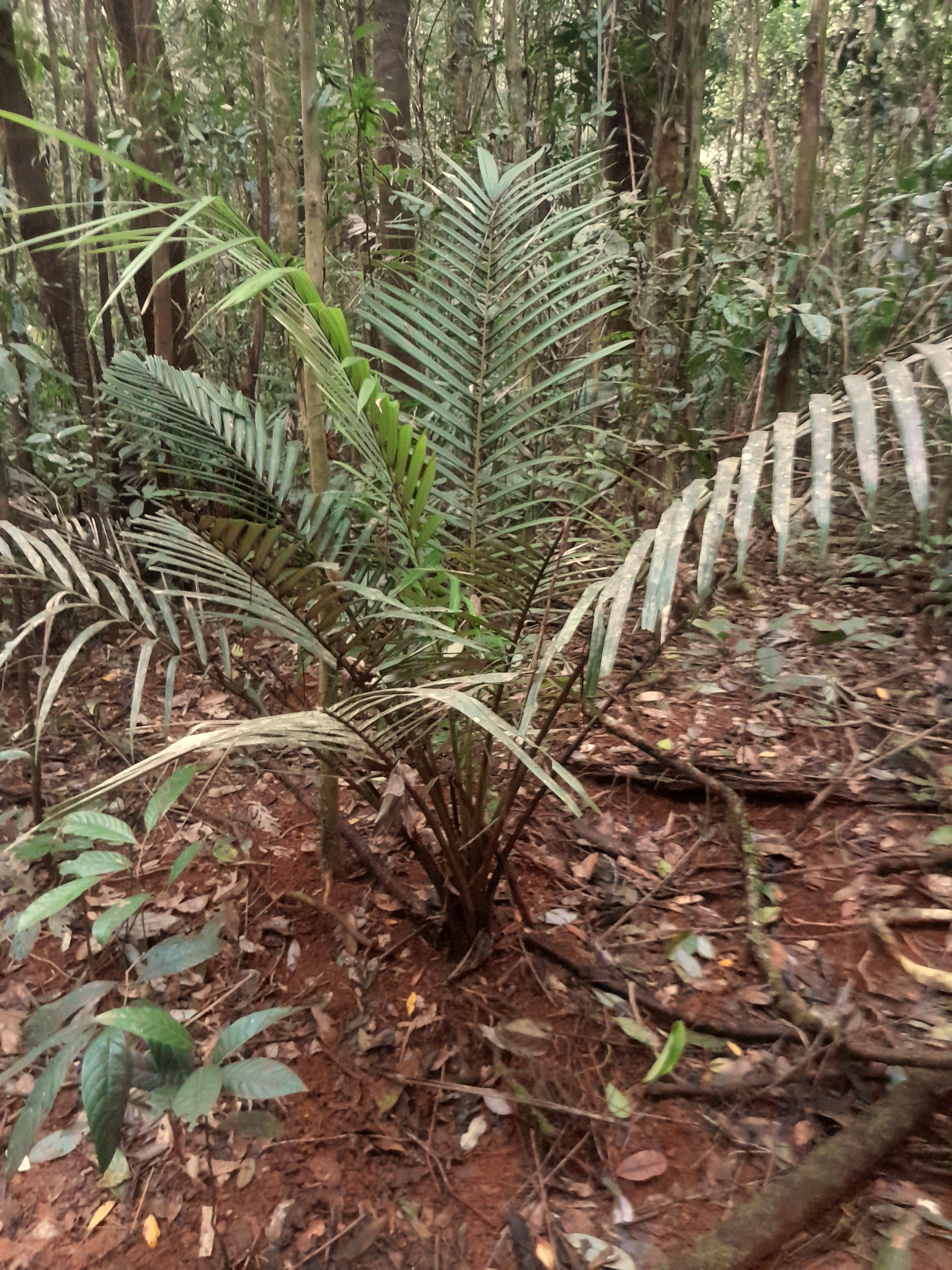
"Young" rosette form, in Wooroonooran National Park

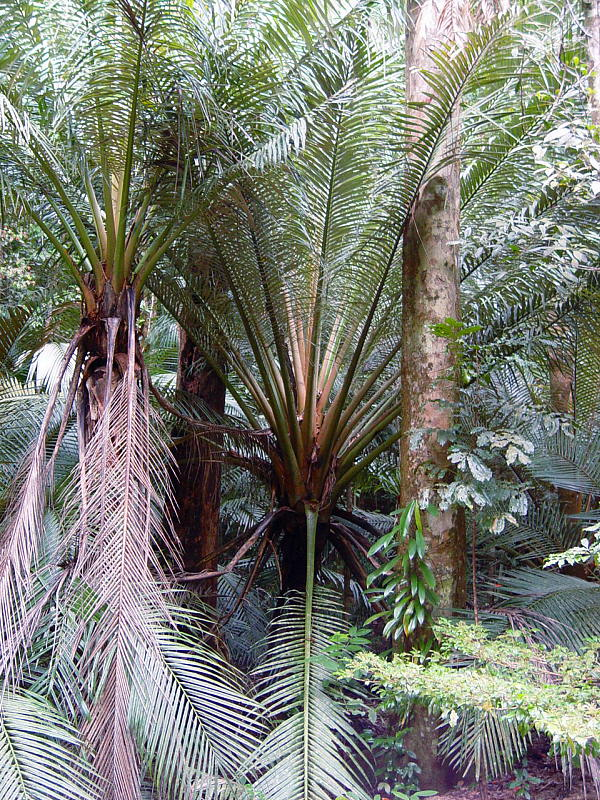
On Mount Lewis

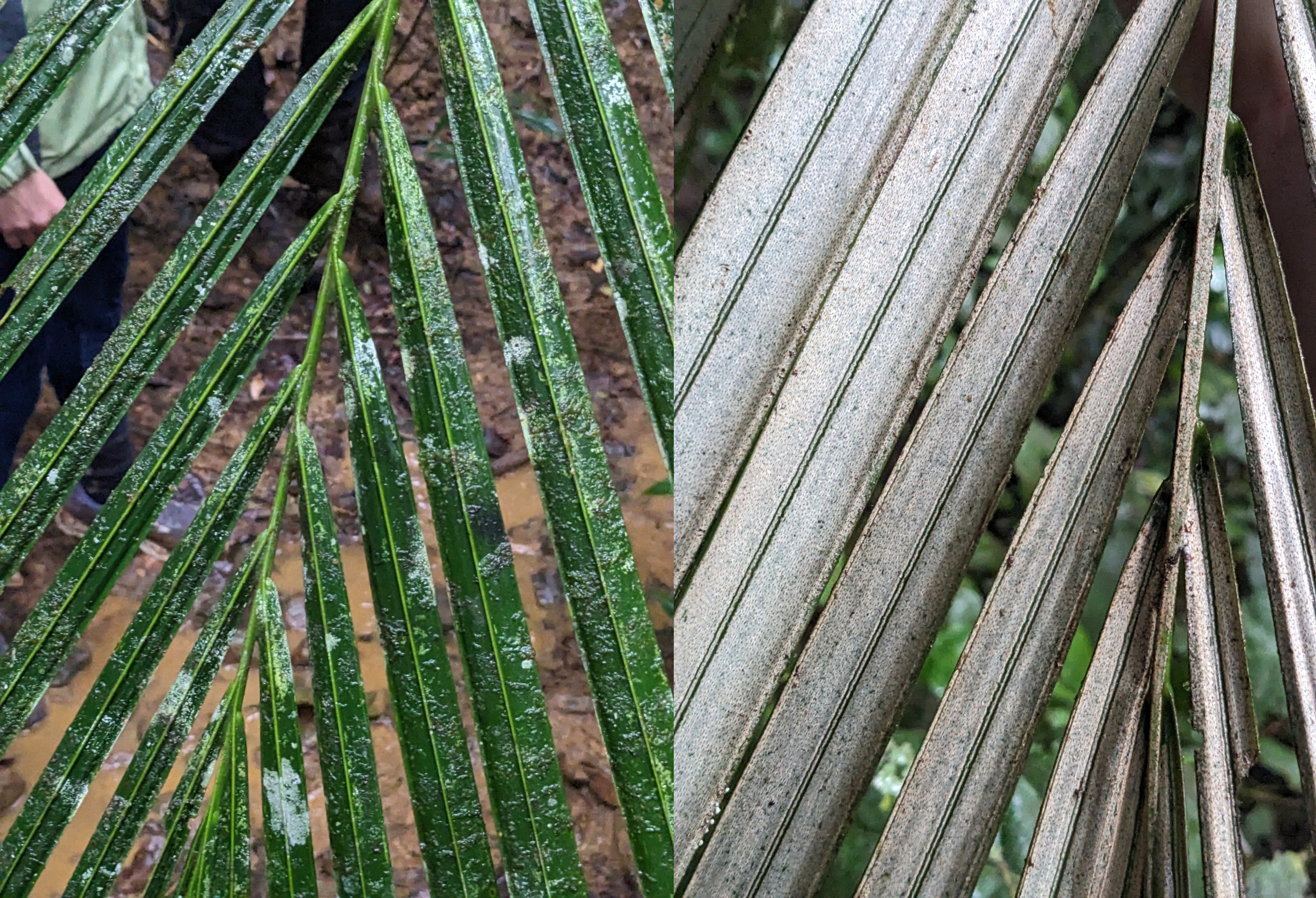
Upper (left) and lower (right) sides of the frond

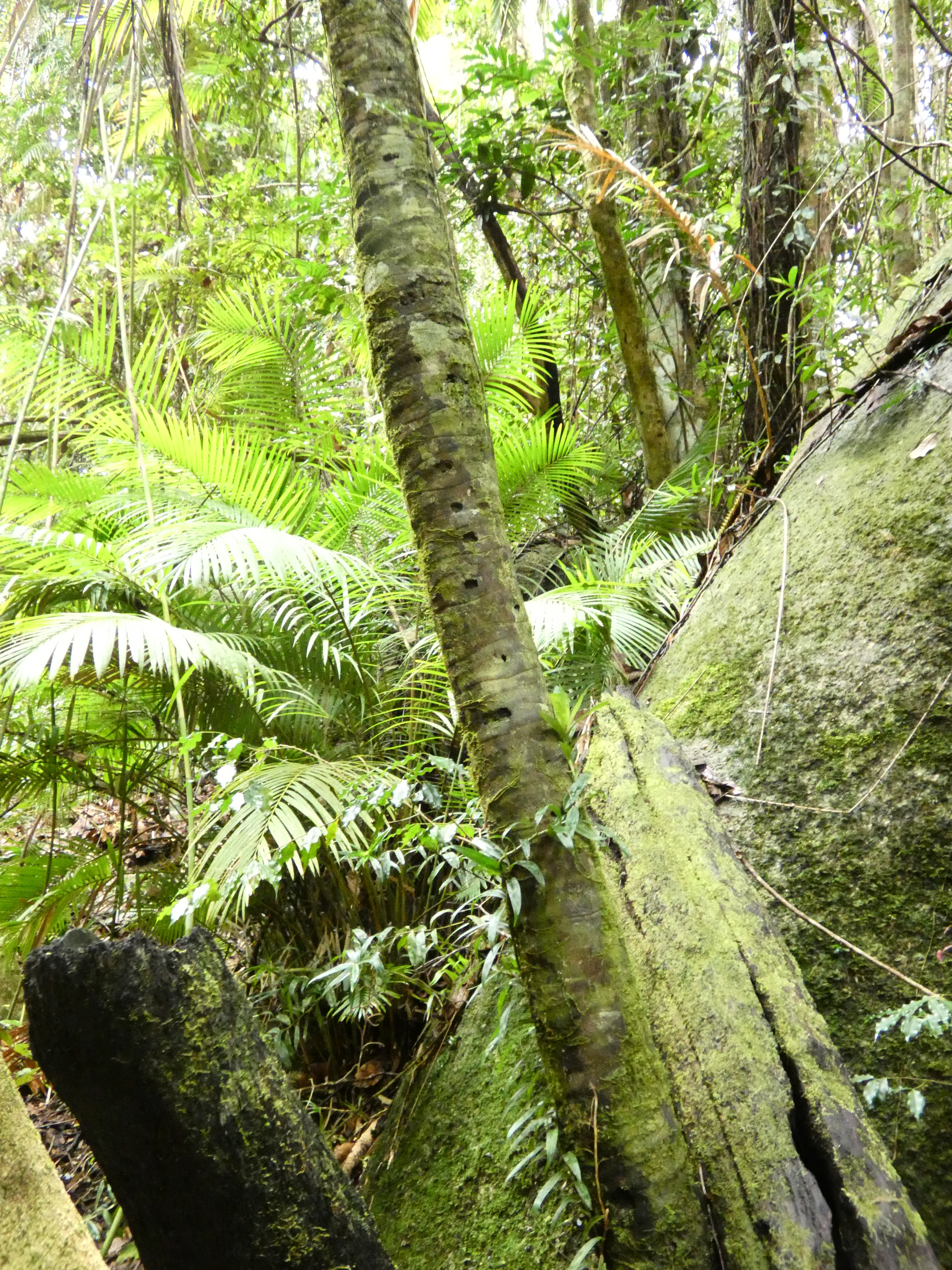
Trunk

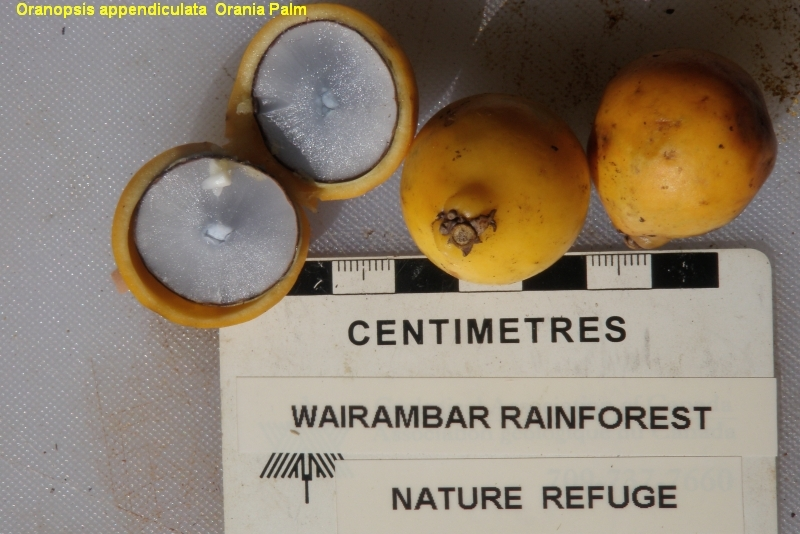
Fruit
