= Burckella sorei =

Conservation status
- Near Threatened (IUCN 2.3)

Scientific classification
- Kingdom: Plantae
- Clade: Tracheophytes
- Clade: Angiosperms
- Clade: Eudicots
- Clade: Asterids
- Order: Ericales
- Family: Sapotaceae
- Genus: Burckella
- Species: B. sorei

Binomial name
- Burckella sorei P.Royen

Species of flowering plant

Burckella sorei is a species of plant in the family Sapotaceae. It is found in Papua New Guinea and the Solomon Islands. It is threatened by habitat loss.
