= Tsebona =

Conservation status
- Near Threatened (IUCN 3.1)

Scientific classification
- Kingdom: Plantae
- Clade: Tracheophytes
- Clade: Angiosperms
- Clade: Eudicots
- Clade: Asterids
- Order: Ericales
- Family: Sapotaceae
- Subfamily: Sapotoideae
- Genus: Tsebona; Capuron
- Species: T. macrantha

Binomial name
- Tsebona macrantha Capuron

Genus of flowering plants

Tsebona is a genus of the plant family Sapotaceae described as a genus in 1962.

There is only one known species, Tsebona macrantha, endemic to Madagascar.
