= Isonandra borneensis =

Conservation status
- Endangered (IUCN 3.1)

Scientific classification
- Kingdom: Plantae
- Clade: Embryophytes
- Clade: Tracheophytes
- Clade: Angiosperms
- Clade: Eudicots
- Clade: Asterids
- Order: Ericales
- Family: Sapotaceae
- Genus: Isonandra
- Species: I. borneensis

Binomial name
- Isonandra borneensis H.J.Lam

Species of tree

Isonandra borneensis is a species of tree in the family Sapotaceae.

== Description ==
Isonandra borneensis grows as a tree up to 40 metres (130 ft) tall, with a trunk diameter of up to 70 cm (30 in). The bark is brown. Inflorescences bear up to three white flowers.

== Distribution and habitat ==
Isonandra borneensis is endemic to Borneo. Its habitat is forests from sea-level to 1,000 m (3,000 ft) elevation.
