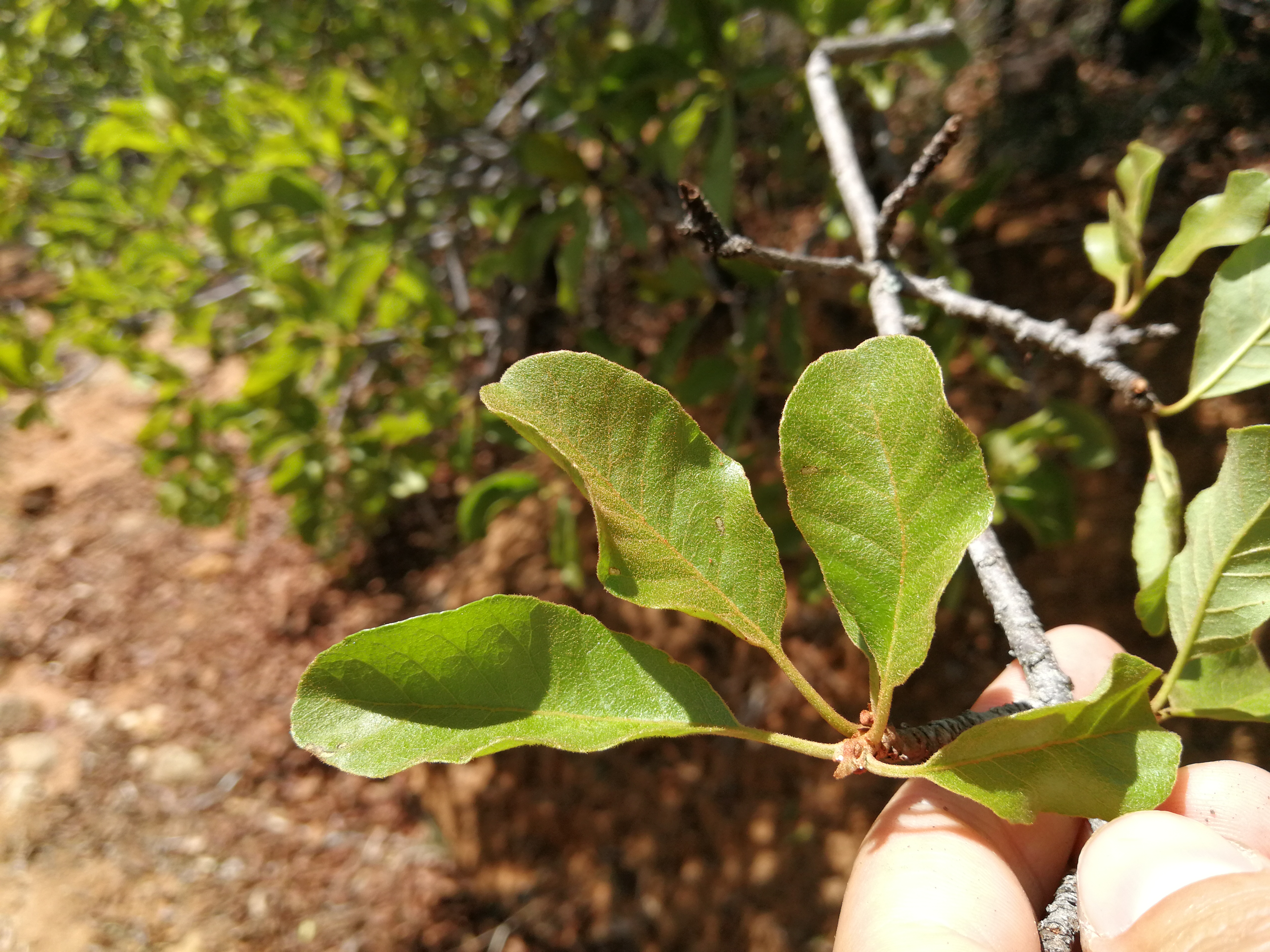
- Capurodendron mandrarense, a species from dry areas of southern Madagascar

Scientific classification
- Kingdom: Plantae
- Clade: Tracheophytes
- Clade: Angiosperms
- Clade: Eudicots
- Clade: Asterids
- Order: Ericales
- Family: Sapotaceae
- Subfamily: Sapotoideae
- Genus: Capurodendron; Aubrév.

Type species
- Capurodendron rubrocostatum (Jum. & H. Perrier) Aubrév.

= Capurodendron =

Genus of flowering plants

Capurodendron is a genus of plants in the family Sapotaceae described by André Aubréville in 1962.

The genus contains 43 species which are all endemic to Madagascar. It is the second largest endemic genus of this island after Dypsis. The major part of its species are endangered or critically endangered of extinction by selective logging and the massive deforestation that Madagascar is suffering.

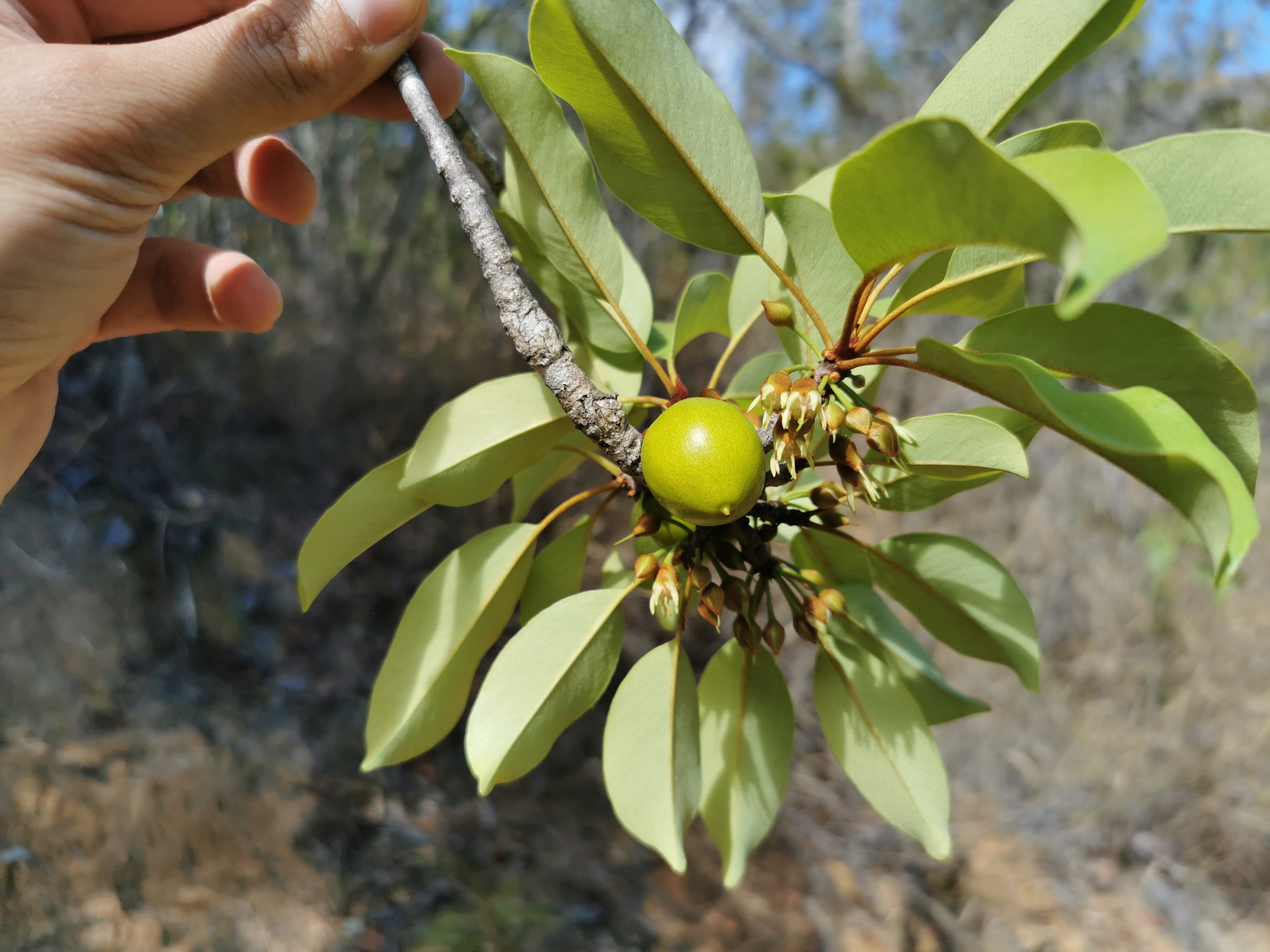
Capurodendron andrafiamenae L. Gaut & Boluda with flowers and a fruit

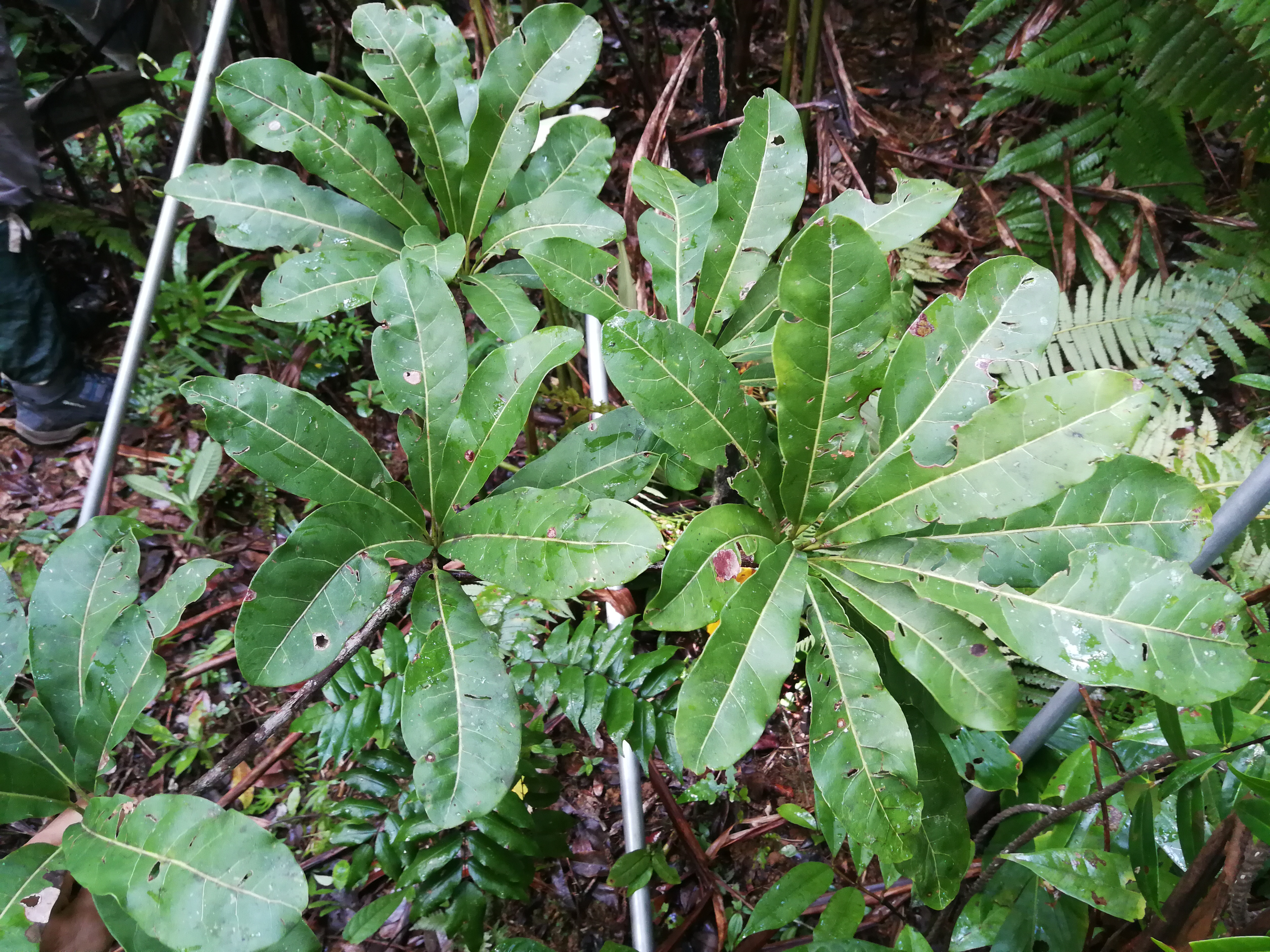
Capurodendron aubrevillei L. Gaut & Boluda, a species described in 2022.

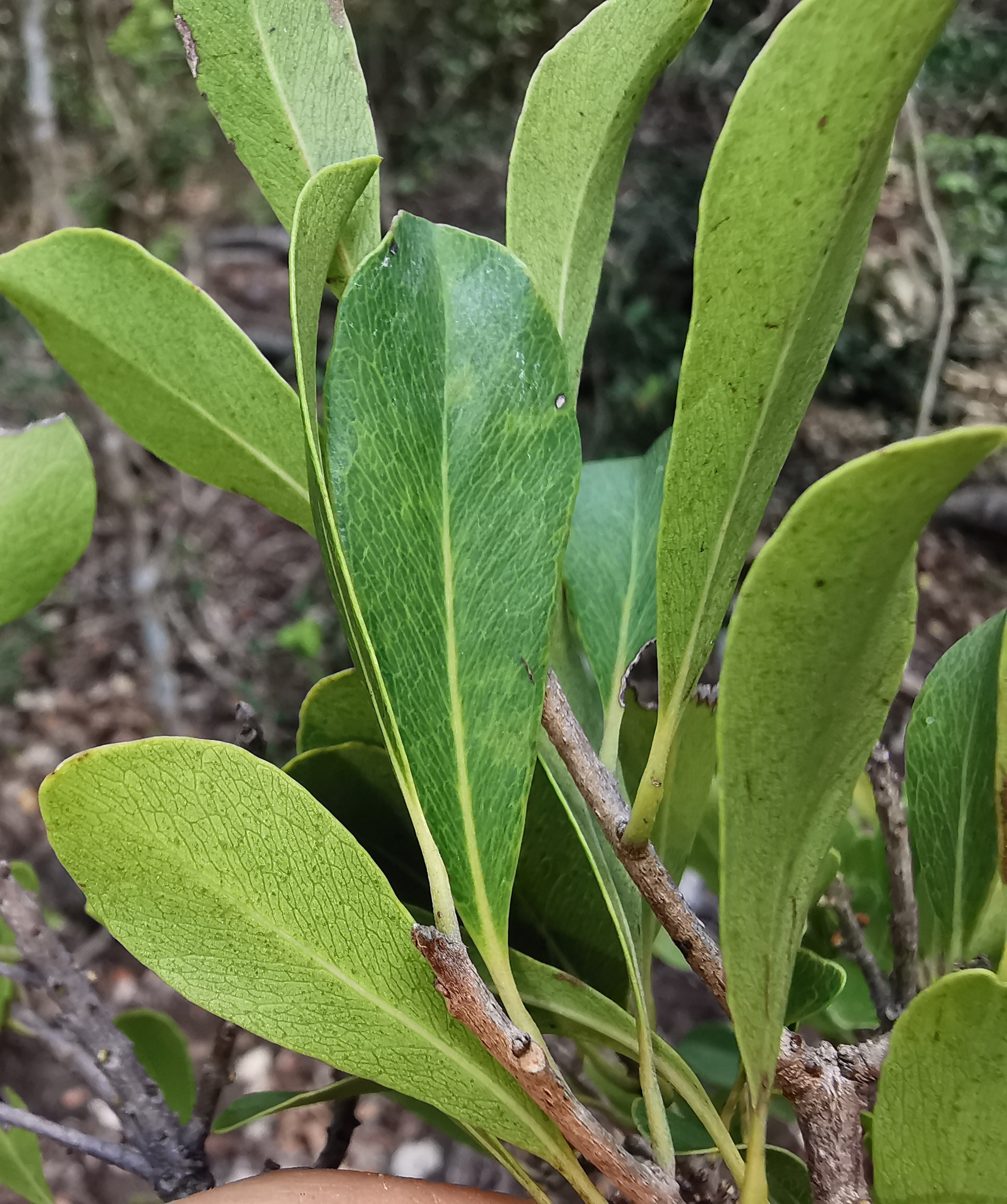
Capurodendron naciriae L. Gaut & Boluda', a species described in 2022 from the extreme north of Madagascar

== Species ==
43 species are accepted.

- Capurodendron ainae Boluda, Naciri & L.Gaut.
- Capurodendron ambanizanense Boluda & L.Gaut.
- Capurodendron andrafiamenae L.Gaut. & Boluda
- Capurodendron androyense Aubrév.
- Capurodendron ankaranense Aubrév.
- Capurodendron antilahimenae Boluda & L.Gaut.
- Capurodendron antongiliense Aubrév.
- Capurodendron apollonioides Aubrév.
- Capurodendron aubrevillei L.Gaut. & Boluda
- Capurodendron bakeri (Scott Elliot) Aubrév.
- Capurodendron birkinshawii L.Gaut. & Boluda
- Capurodendron costatum Aubrév.
- Capurodendron delphinense Aubrév.
- Capurodendron gracilifolium Aubrév.
- Capurodendron greveanum Aubrév.
- Capurodendron ludiifolium Aubrév.
- Capurodendron madagascariense (Lecomte) Aubrév.
- Capurodendron mandrarense Aubrév.
- Capurodendron microphyllum (Scott Elliot) Aubrév.
- Capurodendron mikearum L.Gaut. & Boluda
- Capurodendron naciriae L.Gaut. & Boluda
- Capurodendron namorokense L.Gaut. & Boluda
- Capurodendron nanophyllum L.Gaut. & Naciri
- Capurodendron nataliae Boluda & L.Gaut.
- Capurodendron nodosum Aubrév.
- Capurodendron oblongifolium (Lecomte) L.Gaut. & Boluda
- Capurodendron perrieri (Lecomte) Aubrév.
- Capurodendron pervillei (Engl.) Aubrév.
- Capurodendron pseudoterminalia Aubrév.
- Capurodendron randrianaivoi L.Gaut. & Boluda
- Capurodendron ratovosonii Boluda & L.Gaut.
- Capurodendron razakamalalae Boluda & L.Gaut.
- Capurodendron rubrocostatum (Jum. & H.Perrier) Aubrév.
- Capurodendron rufescens Aubrév.
- Capurodendron sahafariense L.Gaut. & Naciri
- Capurodendron sakalavum Aubrév.
- Capurodendron sakarivorum L.Gaut. & Boluda
- Capurodendron schatzii L.Gaut. & Naciri
- Capurodendron sommerae Boluda, Naciri & L.Gaut.
- Capurodendron suarezense Aubrév.
- Capurodendron tampinense (Lecomte) Aubrév.
- Capurodendron vulcanicola Boluda & L.Gaut.
