= Neohemsleya =

Conservation status
- Vulnerable (IUCN 2.3)

Scientific classification
- Kingdom: Plantae
- Clade: Tracheophytes
- Clade: Angiosperms
- Clade: Eudicots
- Clade: Asterids
- Order: Ericales
- Family: Sapotaceae
- Subfamily: Sapotoideae
- Genus: Neohemsleya; T.D.Penn.
- Species: N. usambarensis

Binomial name
- Neohemsleya usambarensis T.D.Penn.

Genus of flowering plants

Neohemsleya is a genus of plant in family Sapotaceae described as a genus in 1991.

There is only one known species, Neohemsleya usambarensis, endemic to the Usambara Mountains of Tanzania.

The species is listed as vulnerable.
