= Neolemonniera clitandrifolia =

Conservation status
- Vulnerable (IUCN 3.1)

Scientific classification
- Kingdom: Plantae
- Clade: Tracheophytes
- Clade: Angiosperms
- Clade: Eudicots
- Clade: Asterids
- Order: Ericales
- Family: Sapotaceae
- Genus: Neolemonniera
- Species: N. clitandrifolia

Binomial name
- Neolemonniera clitandrifolia (A.Chev.) Heine

Synonyms
- Le-monniera clitandrifolia (A.Chev.) Lecomte; Lecomtedoxa clitandrifolia (A.Chev.) Baehni; Mimusops clitandrifolia A.Chev. Pouteria aylmeri (M.B.Scott) Baehni; Sideroxylon aylmeri M.B.Scott

Species of flowering plant

Neolemonniera clitandrifolia is a species of plant in the family Sapotaceae. It is found in Ghana, Liberia, Nigeria, and Sierra Leone. It is threatened by habitat loss.
