= Hydriastele hombronii =

Conservation status
- Data Deficient (IUCN 2.3)

Scientific classification
- Kingdom: Plantae
- Clade: Tracheophytes
- Clade: Angiosperms
- Clade: Monocots
- Clade: Commelinids
- Order: Arecales
- Family: Arecaceae
- Genus: Hydriastele
- Species: H. hombronii

Binomial name
- Hydriastele hombronii Becc. W.J.Baker & Loo (2004)

Synonyms
- Gulubia hombronii Becc. (1910)

Species of palm

Hydriastele hombronii (formerly Gulubia hombronii) is a species of flowering plant in the family Arecaceae.

It is a palm found only in Solomon Islands, where it grows on outcrops of ultrabasic soil on Choiseul, Santa Isabel, and several other islands, from 100 up to 1,500 metres elevation. It is threatened by habitat loss.
