= Lecomtedoxa nogo =

Conservation status
- Vulnerable (IUCN 2.3)

Scientific classification
- Kingdom: Plantae
- Clade: Tracheophytes
- Clade: Angiosperms
- Clade: Eudicots
- Clade: Asterids
- Order: Ericales
- Family: Sapotaceae
- Genus: Lecomtedoxa
- Species: L. nogo

Binomial name
- Lecomtedoxa nogo (A.Chev.) Aubrév.

Synonyms
- Walkeria nogo A.Chev.; Nogo chevalieri Baehni

Species of flowering plant

Lecomtedoxa nogo is a species of plant in the family Sapotaceae. It is endemic to Gabon.

The species is listed as vulnerable.
