= Gluema ivorensis =

Conservation status
- Vulnerable (IUCN 2.3)

Scientific classification
- Kingdom: Plantae
- Clade: Tracheophytes
- Clade: Angiosperms
- Clade: Eudicots
- Clade: Asterids
- Order: Ericales
- Family: Sapotaceae
- Genus: Gluema
- Species: G. ivorensis

Binomial name
- Gluema ivorensis Aubrév. & Pellegr.

Species of flowering plant

Gluema ivorensis is a species of plant in the family Sapotaceae. It is found in Cameroon, Ivory Coast, Gabon, and Ghana. It is threatened by habitat loss.
