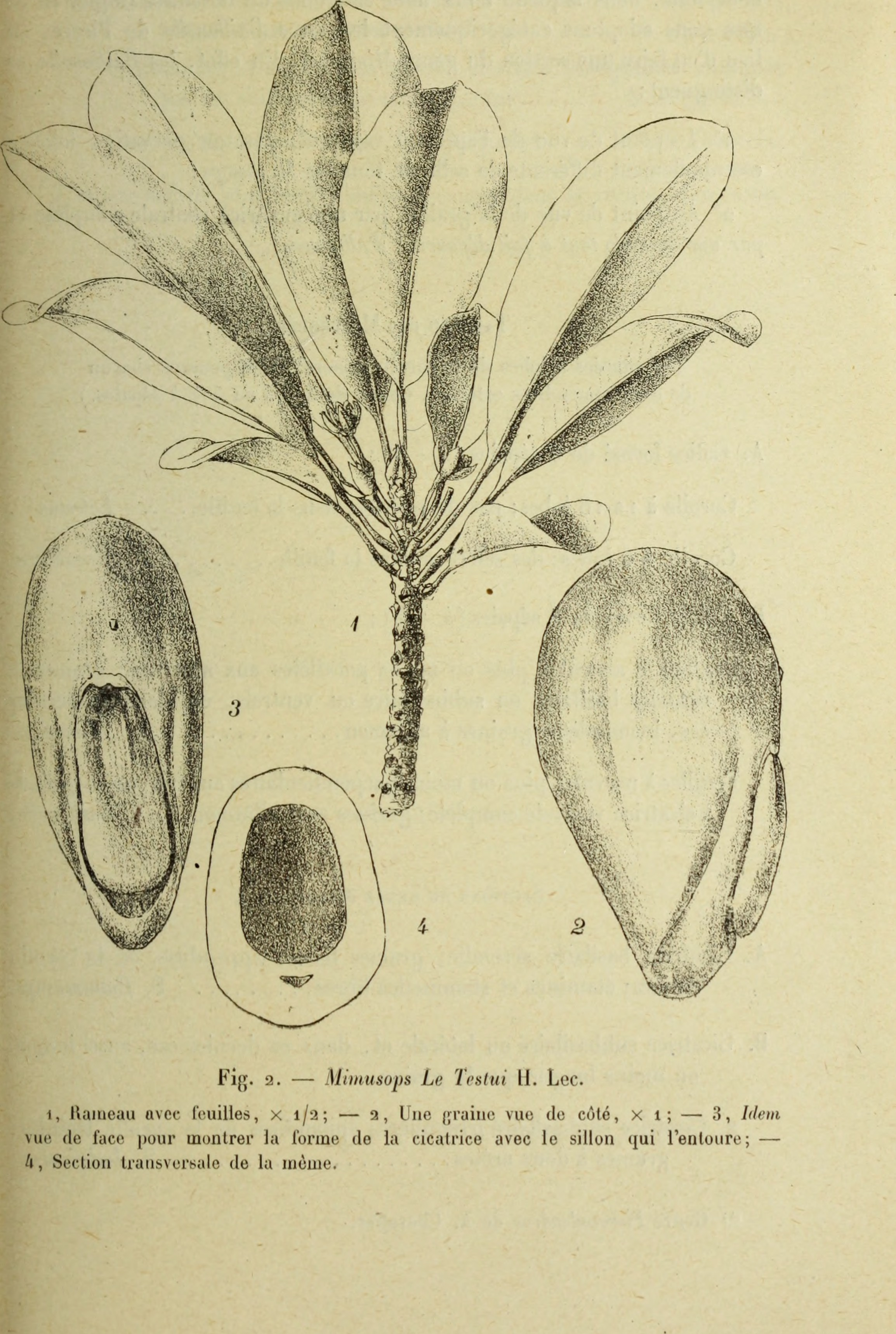

Conservation status
- Endangered (IUCN 3.1)

Scientific classification
- Kingdom: Plantae
- Clade: Tracheophytes
- Clade: Angiosperms
- Clade: Eudicots
- Clade: Asterids
- Order: Ericales
- Family: Sapotaceae
- Subfamily: Sapotoideae
- Genus: Autranella; A.Chev.
- Species: A. congolensis

Binomial name
- Autranella congolensis (De Wild.) A.Chev.

Synonyms
- Genus: Ambianella Willis; Species: Mimusops congolensis De Wild.; Mimusops boonei De Wild.; Mimusops letestui Lecomte; Autranella boonei (De Wild.) A.Chev.; Autranella letestui (Lecomte) A.Chev.

= Autranella =

Genus of flowering plants

Autranella is a genus of plant in family Sapotaceae described as a genus in 1917.

== Species and distribution ==
This genus contains only one recognized species, Autranella congolensis (also known as mukulungu), native to west-central Africa (Nigeria, Cameroon, Gabon, Central African Republic, Republic of the Congo, Cabinda, and Democratic Republic of the Congo).
