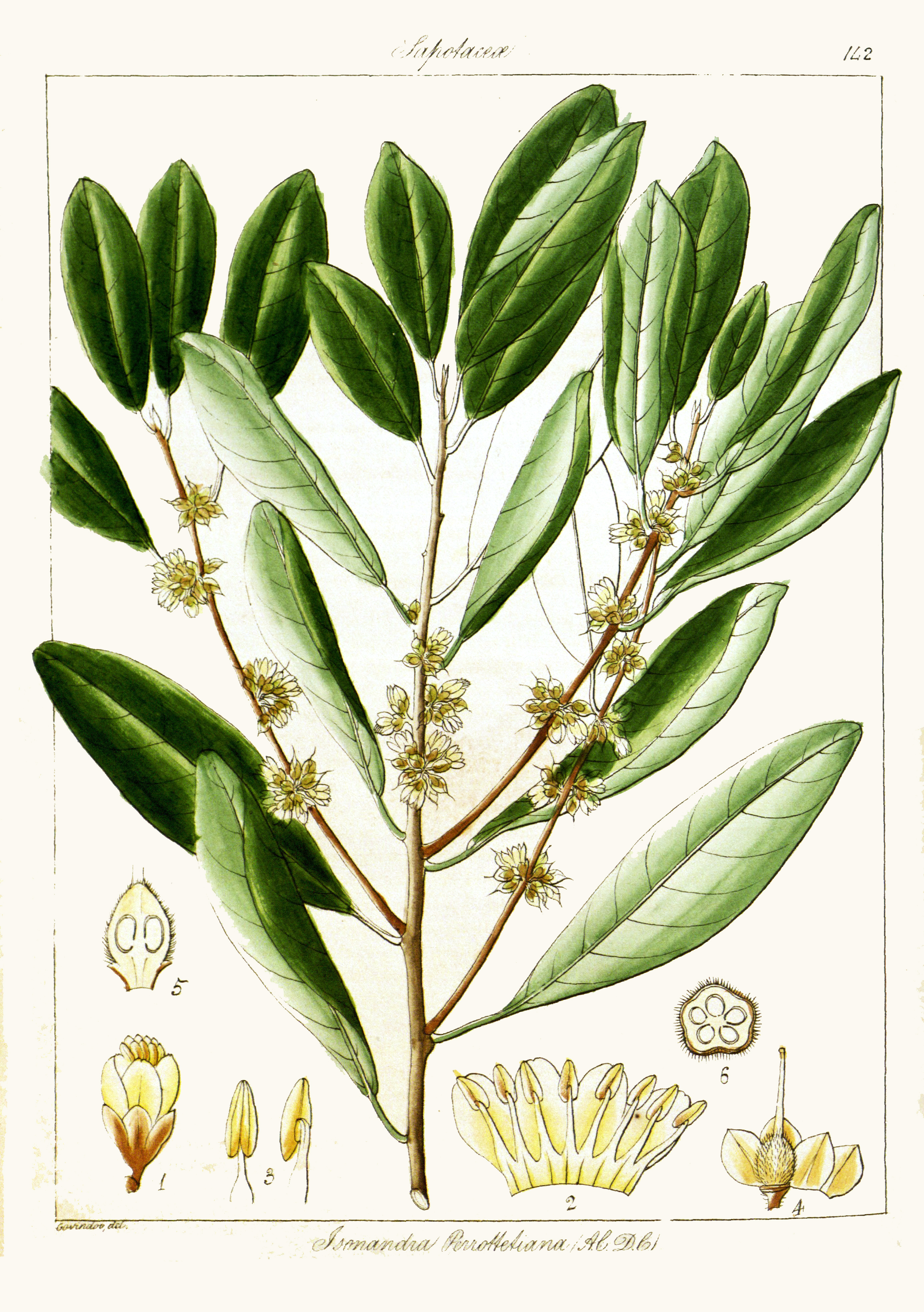
- Isonandra perrottetiana

Scientific classification
- Kingdom: Plantae
- Clade: Tracheophytes
- Clade: Angiosperms
- Clade: Eudicots
- Clade: Asterids
- Order: Ericales
- Family: Sapotaceae
- Subfamily: Sapotoideae
- Genus: Isonandra; Wight

= Isonandra =

Genus of flowering plants

Isonandra is a genus of plants in the family Sapotaceae found in tropical Asia, described as a genus in 1840.

Isonandra is native to India, Sri Lanka, Malaysia, and Borneo.

species

1. Isonandra alloneura Jeuken - Sri Lanka
2. Isonandra borneensis H.J.Lam - Borneo
3. Isonandra compta Dubard - Sri Lanka
4. Isonandra lanceolata Wight - Sri Lanka, southern India, Borneo
5. Isonandra montana (Thwaites) Gamble - Sri Lanka
6. Isonandra perakensis King & Gamble - Peninsular Malaysia
7. Isonandra perrottetiana A.DC. - southern India
8. Isonandra stocksii C.B.Clarke in J.D.Hooker - southern India
9. Isonandra villosa Wight - southern India
10. Isonandra zeylanica Jeuken - Sri Lanka
