= Neolemonniera =

Scientific classification
- Kingdom: Plantae
- Clade: Tracheophytes
- Clade: Angiosperms
- Clade: Eudicots
- Clade: Asterids
- Order: Ericales
- Family: Sapotaceae
- Subfamily: Sapotoideae
- Genus: Neolemonniera; Heine

Synonyms
- Le-monniera Lecomte 1918, illegitimate homonym, not Lemonniera De Wild 1894 (Hyphomycetes)

Genus of flowering plants

Neolemonniera is a genus of plants in the family Sapotaceae first described as a genus in 1918.

Neolemonniera is native to tropical western and west-central Africa.

species

1. Neolemonniera batesii (Engl.) Heine - Ivory Coast, Liberia, Gabon, possibly Cameroon
2. Neolemonniera clitandrifolia (A.Chev.) Heine - Ivory Coast, Liberia, Sierra Leone
3. Neolemonniera ogouensis (Dubard) Heine - Gabon
