= Vitellariopsis kirkii =

Conservation status
- Vulnerable (IUCN 2.3)

Scientific classification
- Kingdom: Plantae
- Clade: Tracheophytes
- Clade: Angiosperms
- Clade: Eudicots
- Clade: Asterids
- Order: Ericales
- Family: Sapotaceae
- Genus: Vitellariopsis
- Species: V. kirkii

Binomial name
- Vitellariopsis kirkii (Baker) Dubard

Synonyms
- Butyrospermum kirkii Baker; Mimusops bakeri Baill.

Species of plant

Vitellariopsis kirkii is a species of plant in the family Sapotaceae. It is found in Kenya and Tanzania.
