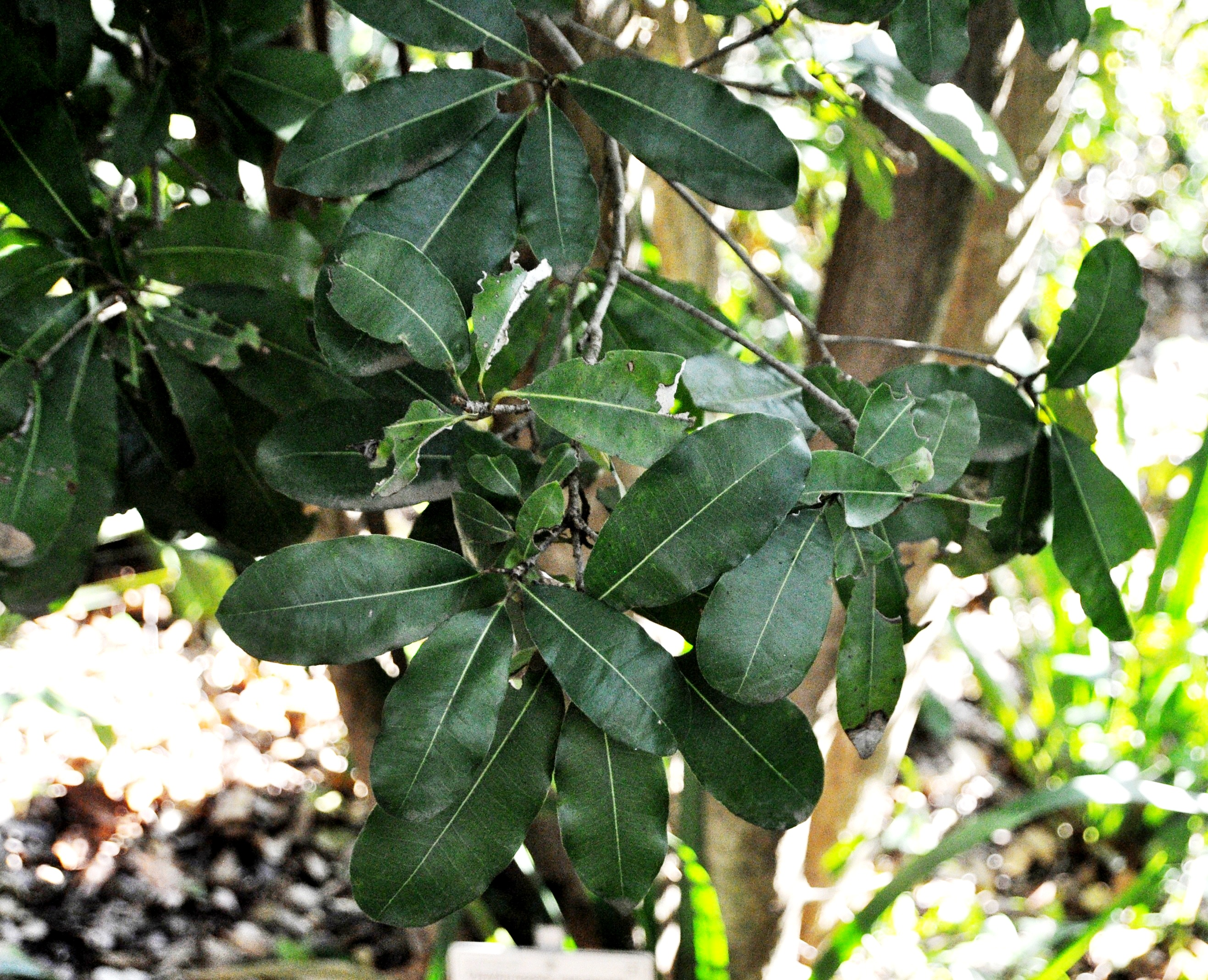
- Foliage of V. marginata

Scientific classification
- Kingdom: Plantae
- Clade: Tracheophytes
- Clade: Angiosperms
- Clade: Eudicots
- Clade: Asterids
- Order: Ericales
- Family: Sapotaceae
- Subfamily: Sapotoideae
- Genus: Vitellariopsis (Baill.) ex Dubard

Type species
- Vitellariopsis kirkii (Baker) Dubard

Synonyms
- Austromimusops A.Meeuse

= Vitellariopsis =

Genus of flowering plants

Vitellariopsis is a group of plants in the family Sapotaceae described as a genus in 1915. The genus is native to eastern and southern Africa.

species

1. Vitellariopsis cuneata (Engl.) Aubrév. - Usambara Mts in Tanzania
2. Vitellariopsis dispar (N.E.Br.) Aubrév. - Eswatini, KwaZulu-Natal
3. Vitellariopsis ferruginea Kupicha - Zimbabwe
4. Vitellariopsis kirkii (Baker) Dubard - Nampula, Tanzania, Kenya
5. Vitellariopsis marginata (N.E.Br.) Aubrév. - Mozambique, Eswatini, South Africa
