= Hydriastele macrospadix =

Conservation status
- Data Deficient (IUCN 3.1)

Scientific classification
- Kingdom: Plantae
- Clade: Tracheophytes
- Clade: Angiosperms
- Clade: Monocots
- Clade: Commelinids
- Order: Arecales
- Family: Arecaceae
- Genus: Hydriastele
- Species: H. macrospadix

Binomial name
- Hydriastele macrospadix (Burret) W.J.Baker & Loo

Synonyms
- Gulubia macrospadix (Burret) H.E.Moore; Paragulubia macrospadix Burret

Species of palm

Hydriastele macrospadix is a species of palm. It is endemic to the Solomon Islands archipelago, which includes the northern island of Bougainville, part of Papua New Guinea, and the nation of Solomon Islands which covers the southern part of the archipelago.

On Bougainville Hydriastele macrospadix is predominant, with species of Pandanus and tree ferns (Cyathea sp.), in montane scrub above 1,500 metres elevation.
