= Isonandra villosa =

Conservation status
- Endangered (IUCN 2.3)

Scientific classification
- Kingdom: Plantae
- Clade: Tracheophytes
- Clade: Angiosperms
- Clade: Eudicots
- Clade: Asterids
- Order: Ericales
- Family: Sapotaceae
- Genus: Isonandra
- Species: I. villosa

Binomial name
- Isonandra villosa Wight

Species of flowering plant

Isonandra villosa is a species of plant in the family Sapotaceae. It is a tree native to Kerala and Tamil Nadu in southern India. It is threatened by habitat loss.
