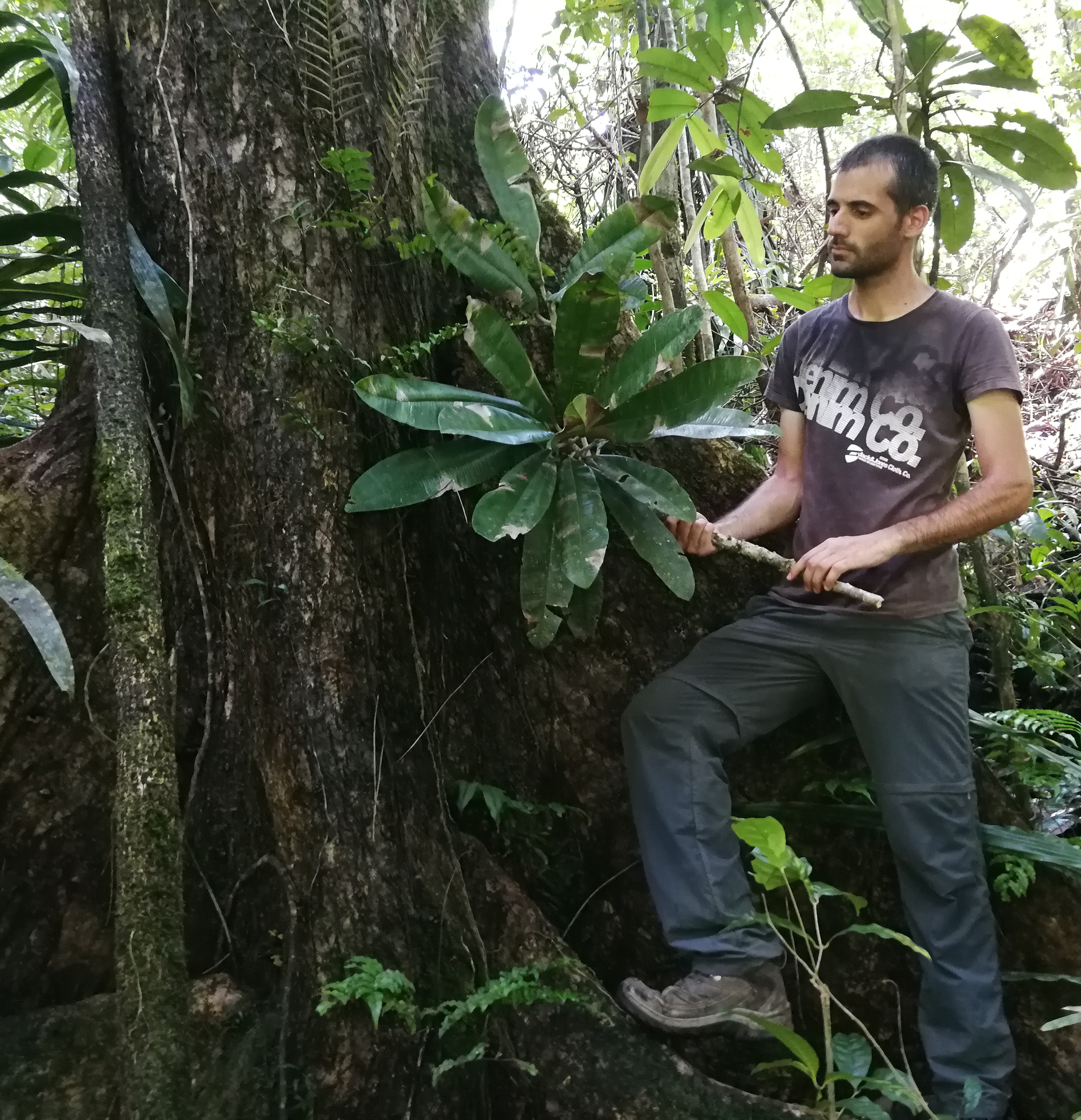
- Trunk and branch of Labramia costata collected by the botanist Carlos G. Boluda.

Scientific classification
- Kingdom: Plantae
- Clade: Tracheophytes
- Clade: Angiosperms
- Clade: Eudicots
- Clade: Asterids
- Order: Ericales
- Family: Sapotaceae
- Subfamily: Sapotoideae
- Genus: Labramia; A.DC.

Type species
- Labramia bojeri A.DC.

Synonyms
- Delastrea A.DC., illegitimate homonym; Semicipium Pierre

= Labramia =

Genus of flowering plants

Labramia is a genus of plants in the family Sapotaceae described as a genus in 1844. De Candolle initially named the genus Delastrea, which is a homonym for an older fungus name by Tulasne, so De Candolle changed the name to Labramia in the appendix to the same book.

Labramia is native to certain islands in the Indian Ocean (Madagascar and nearby Mayotte).

== Species ==
Ten species are accepted.

1. Labramia ambondrombeensis L.Gaut. & Randriarisoa – Madagascar
2. Labramia ankaranaensis Aubrév. - Madagascar
3. Labramia boivinii (Pierre) Aubrév. - Madagascar
4. Labramia bojeri A.DC. - Madagascar
5. Labramia capuronii Aubrév. - Madagascar
6. Labramia costata (Hartog ex Baill.) Aubrév. - Madagascar
7. Labramia louvelii Aubrév. - Madagascar
8. Labramia mayottensis Labat, M.Pignal & O.Pascal - Mayotte
9. Labramia platanoides Capuron ex Aubrév. - Madagascar
10. Labramia sambiranensis Capuron ex Aubrév. - Madagascar
