= Bemangidia =

Scientific classification
- Kingdom: Plantae
- Clade: Tracheophytes
- Clade: Angiosperms
- Clade: Eudicots
- Clade: Asterids
- Order: Ericales
- Family: Sapotaceae
- Subfamily: Sapotoideae
- Genus: Bemangidia; L.Gaut.
- Species: B. lowyri

Binomial name
- Bemangidia lowyri L.Gaut.

Genus of flowering plants

Bemangidia is a monotypic genus of flowering plants belonging to the family Sapotaceae. Its only species is Bemangidia lowryi.

Its native range is Madagascar.
