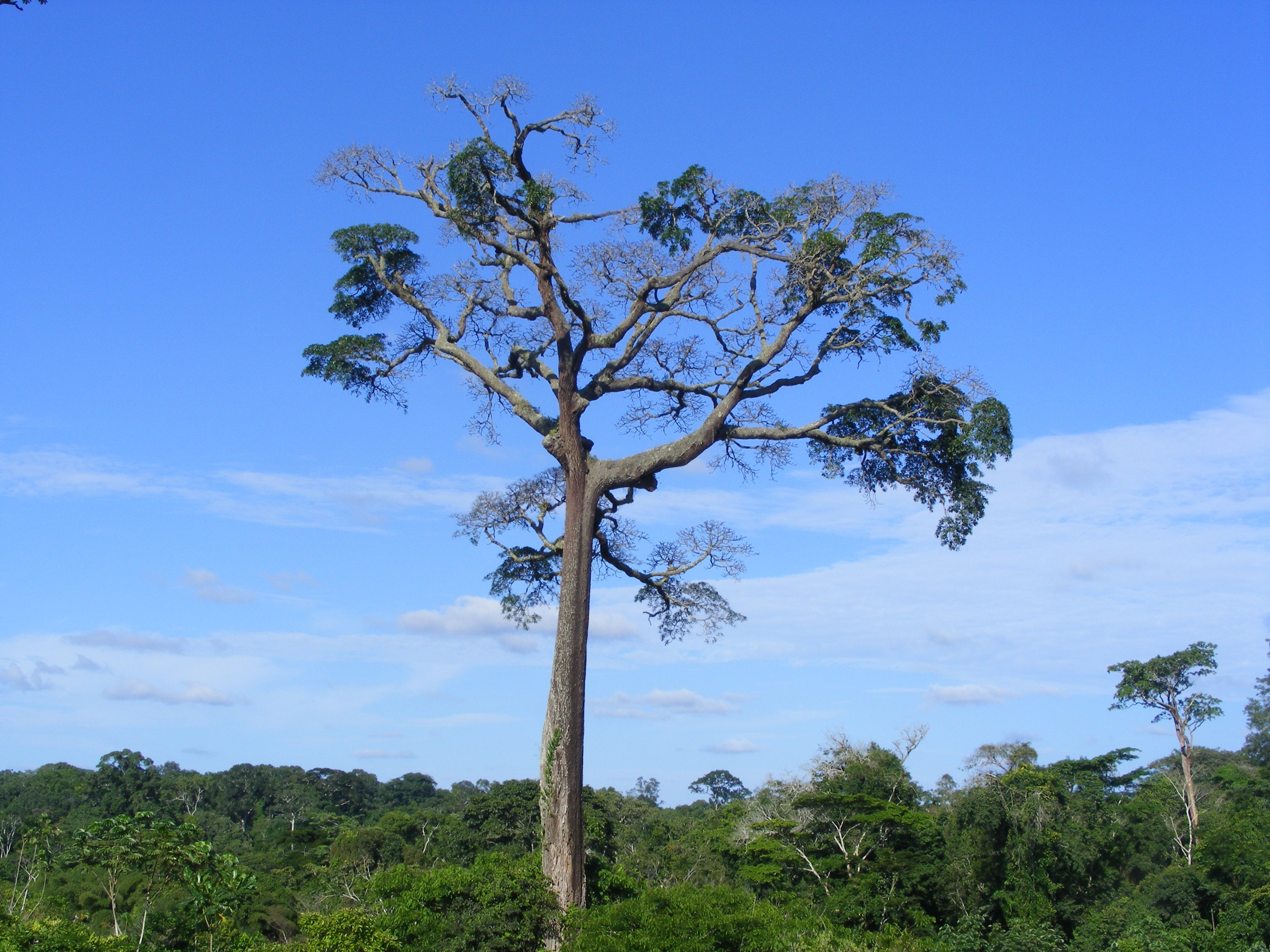

Conservation status
- Vulnerable (IUCN 2.3)

Scientific classification
- Kingdom: Plantae
- Clade: Tracheophytes
- Clade: Angiosperms
- Clade: Eudicots
- Clade: Asterids
- Order: Ericales
- Family: Sapotaceae
- Subfamily: Sapotoideae
- Genus: Baillonella; Pierre
- Species: B. toxisperma

Binomial name
- Baillonella toxisperma Pierre

= Baillonella =

Genus of trees

Baillonella is a genus of trees in the family Sapotaceae. Baillonella toxisperma (also called African pearwood, djave nut, or moabi) is the only species in the genus. It is found in Angola, Cameroon, the Republic of the Congo, the Democratic Republic of the Congo, Gabon and Nigeria. Its natural habitat is subtropical or tropical moist lowland forests. It is threatened by habitat loss. The moabi tree's nut oil is a key component of Baka and other indigenous people's subsistence.

== Conservation ==
Baillonella toxisperma is declining over large parts of its range due to overexploitation, as it is both a highly desired hardwood for international export, and can provide a locally prized edible oil. Although minimum diameter logging restrictions are in place, the species appears to be in decline and has been classified as vulnerable by the IUCN. The building products retailer The Home Depot has included B. toxisperma on their list of endangered hardwoods that will not be sourced by the company, and thus will no longer sell products made of it.
