= Hydriastele vitiensis =

Conservation status
- Vulnerable (IUCN 3.1)

Scientific classification
- Kingdom: Plantae
- Clade: Tracheophytes
- Clade: Angiosperms
- Clade: Monocots
- Clade: Commelinids
- Order: Arecales
- Family: Arecaceae
- Genus: Hydriastele
- Species: H. vitiensis

Binomial name
- Hydriastele vitiensis W.J.Baker & Loo

Synonyms
- Gulubia microcarpa Essig

Species of flowering plant

Hydriastele vitiensis is a species of palm endemic to Fiji. It is a tall palm which can grow up to 25 metres (82 ft) high. It is native to the islands of Viti Levu and Vanua Levu, where it grows in moist lowland forest from sea level to 600 metres (2,000 ft) elevation, often on ridge tops. On Viti Levu individuals or very small populations grow in the southern highlands across to Nakobalevu.

The species is threatened with habitat loss, including from logging and conversion of habitat to plantations. The IUCN Red List assesses the species as Vulnerable.
