= Letestua =

Conservation status
- Least Concern (IUCN 3.1)

Scientific classification
- Kingdom: Plantae
- Clade: Tracheophytes
- Clade: Angiosperms
- Clade: Eudicots
- Clade: Asterids
- Order: Ericales
- Family: Sapotaceae
- Subfamily: Sapotoideae
- Genus: Letestua; Lecomte
- Species: L. durissima

Binomial name
- Letestua durissima (A.Chev.) Lecomte

Synonyms
- Pierreodendron A.Chev. 1917, illegitimate homonym, not Pierreodendron Engl. 1907 (Simaroubaceae); Pierreodendron durissimum A.Chev.; Letestua floribunda Lecomte

Genus of flowering plants

Letestua is a monotypic genus of plants in the family Sapotaceae, described as a genus in 1917.

The genus name of Letestua is in honour of Georges Marie Patrice Charles Le Testu (1877–1967), who was a French colonial administrator in tropical Africa and later worked at a botanical garden in Caen.

There is only one recognized species, Letestua durissima. It is native to Gabon and West Congo.
