= Vitellariopsis ferruginea =

Conservation status
- Vulnerable (IUCN 2.3)

Scientific classification
- Kingdom: Plantae
- Clade: Tracheophytes
- Clade: Angiosperms
- Clade: Eudicots
- Clade: Asterids
- Order: Ericales
- Family: Sapotaceae
- Genus: Vitellariopsis
- Species: V. ferruginea

Binomial name
- Vitellariopsis ferruginea Kupicha

Species of flowering plant

Vitellariopsis ferruginea is a species of plant in the family Sapotaceae. It is found in Zimbabwe and possibly Mozambique.
