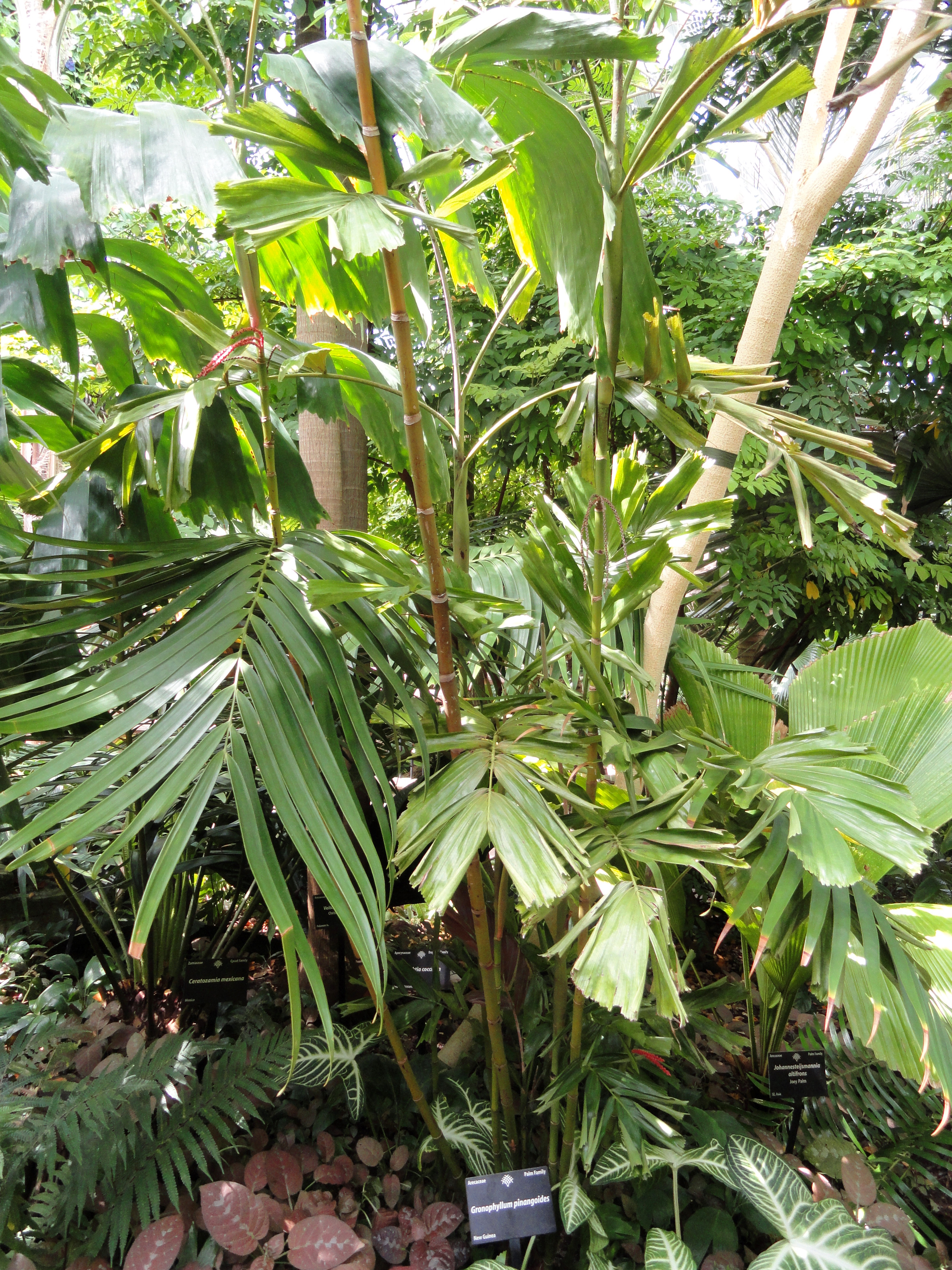
- Hydriastele pinangoides

Scientific classification
- Kingdom: Plantae
- Clade: Tracheophytes
- Clade: Angiosperms
- Clade: Monocots
- Clade: Commelinids
- Order: Arecales
- Family: Arecaceae
- Subfamily: Arecoideae
- Tribe: Areceae
- Genus: Hydriastele; H. Wendl. & Drude

Synonyms
- Adelonenga (Becc.) Hook.f.; Gronophyllum Scheff.; Gulubia Becc.; Gulubiopsis Becc.; Kentia Blume nom. illeg.; Leptophoenix Becc.; Nengella Becc.; Paragulubia Burret; Siphokentia Burret

= Hydriastele =

Genus of palms

Hydriastele is a diverse and widespread genus of flowering plant in the palm family found throughout northern Australia, Melanesia, Polynesia, and Southeast Asia. It consisted of just nine species until 2004, when molecular research, supported by morphologic similarities, led taxonomists to include the members of the Gulubia, Gronophyllum, and Siphokentia genera. About 40 species are now recognized.

== Description ==
The palms now classified in this genus have uniting traits but are nonetheless diverse. Pleonanthy, monoecy, crownshafts, peduncular bracts, and the lack of armament characterize all members. The trunks may be solitary or suckering and may be diminutive to robust, spanning a range of heights. The leaves are pinnate and widely varied. The inflorescences are branched to three orders with both male and female flowers, some of which are beetle-pollinated. The fruit may be ellipsoidal or spherical and colored yellow, orange, red, purple, or black when ripe, each with a single seed.

== Taxonomy ==
The genus Hydriastele was first formally described in 1875 by Hermann Wendland and Carl Georg Oscar Drude in the journal Linnaea and the type species is Hydriastele wendlandiana. The genus name is derived from Greek, combining "hydriad", a water nymph in mythology, and "column".

=== Species list ===
The following is a list of Hydriastele species accepted by Plants of the World Online as at December 2022:

- Hydriastele apetiolata Petoe & W.J.Baker (New Guinea)
- Hydriastele aprica (B.E.Young) W.J.Baker & Loo (New Guinea)
- Hydriastele beguinii (Burret) W.J.Baker & Loo (Maluku)
- Hydriastele biakensis W.J.Baker & Heatubun (New Guinea)
- Hydriastele bournae W.J.Baker & D.Watling (Fiji)
- Hydriastele calcicola W.J.Baker & Petoe (New Guinea)
- Hydriastele costata F.M.Bailey (Bismarck Archipelago, New Guinea, Queensland)
- Hydriastele cylindrocarpa (Becc.) W.J.Baker & Loo (Santa Cruz Islands, Vanuatu)
- Hydriastele divaricata Heatubun, Petoe & W.J.Baker (New Guinea)
- Hydriastele dransfieldii (Hambali, Maturb., Wanggai & W.J.Baker) W.J.Baker & Loo (New Guinea)
- Hydriastele flabellata (Becc.) W.J.Baker & Loo (New Guinea)
- Hydriastele gibbsiana (Becc.) W.J.Baker & Loo (New Guinea)
- Hydriastele hombronii (Becc.) W.J.Baker & Loo (Solomon Islands)
- Hydriastele kasesa (Lauterb.) Burret (Bismarck Archipelago)
- Hydriastele kjellbergii (Burret) W.J.Baker & Loo (Sulawesi)
- Hydriastele lanata W.J.Baker & Petoe (New Guinea)
- Hydriastele ledermanniana (Becc.) W.J.Baker & Loo (New Guinea)
- Hydriastele longispatha (Becc.) W.J.Baker & Loo (New Guinea)
- Hydriastele lurida (Becc.) W.J.Baker & Loo (New Guinea)
- Hydriastele macrospadix (Burret) W.J.Baker & Loo (Solomon Islands)
- Hydriastele manusii (Essig) W.J.Baker & Loo (Bismarck Archipelago)
- Hydriastele microcarpa (Scheff.) W.J.Baker & Loo (Maluku Islands)
- Hydriastele moluccana (Becc.) W.J.Baker & Loo (Maluku Islands)
- Hydriastele montana (Becc.) W.J.Baker & Loo (New Guinea)
- Hydriastele nannostachys W.J.Baker & Loo (Sulawesi)
- Hydriastele oxypetala Burret) W.J.Baker & Loo (Maluku Islands)
- Hydriastele palauensis (Becc.) W.J.Baker & Loo (Caroline Islands)
- Hydriastele pinangoides (Becc.) W.J.Baker & Loo (New Guinea)
- Hydriastele procera (Blume) W.J.Baker & Loo (New Guinea)
- Hydriastele ramsayi (Becc.) W.J.Baker & Loo (Northern Territory)
- Hydriastele rheophytica Dowe & M.D.Ferrero
- Hydriastele sarasinorum (Burret) W.J.Baker & Loo (New Guinea)
- Hydriastele selebica (Becc.) W.J.Baker & Loo (Sulawesi)
- Hydriastele simbiakii Heatubun, Petoe & W.J.Baker (New Guinea)
- Hydriastele splendida Heatubun, Petoe & W.J.Baker (New Guinea)
- Hydriastele variabilis (Becc.) Burret (New Guinea)
- Hydriastele vitiensis W.J.Baker & Loo (Fiji)
- Hydriastele wendlandiana (F.Muell.) H.Wendl. & Drude (New Guinea, Northern Territory, Queensland)
- Hydriastele wosimiensis W.J.Baker & Petoe (New Guinea)

== Distribution and habitat ==
Their known natural range includes a number of tropical settings in Sulawesi, the Maluku Islands, New Guinea, Australia, the Bismarck Archipelago, the Solomon Islands, New Hebrides, Fiji, and Palau. Very often they are found in rain forests of the montane and low lying varieties or upon ultrabasic rock, limestone ridges and serpentine faces.

== Cultivation and uses ==
Several of these palms are cultivated and typically require conditions resembling those of their range. The trunks of some species are used as wall and floorboard components in house construction or split and fashioned into spears.

== Notes ==
^aThe original website at palmguide.org has been usurped and its full content is no longer available. This link is an incomplete archive of the original.
