= Vitellariopsis dispar =

Conservation status
- Least Concern (IUCN 2.3)

Scientific classification
- Kingdom: Plantae
- Clade: Tracheophytes
- Clade: Angiosperms
- Clade: Eudicots
- Clade: Asterids
- Order: Ericales
- Family: Sapotaceae
- Genus: Vitellariopsis
- Species: V. dispar

Binomial name
- Vitellariopsis dispar (N.E.Br.) Aubrév.

Species of flowering plant

Vitellariopsis dispar is a species of plant in the family Sapotaceae. It is found in South Africa and Eswatini.
