= Lecomtedoxa =

Scientific classification
- Kingdom: Plantae
- Clade: Tracheophytes
- Clade: Angiosperms
- Clade: Eudicots
- Clade: Asterids
- Order: Ericales
- Family: Sapotaceae
- Subfamily: Sapotoideae
- Genus: Lecomtedoxa (Pierre ex Engl.) Dubard

Synonyms
- Mimusops subgen. Lecomteodoxa Pierre ex Engl. 1914; Walkeria A.Chev.; Nogo Baehni

Genus of flowering plants

Lecomtedoxa is a genus of plant in family Sapotaceae described as a genus in 1914.

Lecomtedoxa is native to tropical west-central Africa (Gabon, Cameroon, Republic of the Congo).

Species

1. Lecomtedoxa biraudii – Republic of the Congo, Gabon
2. Lecomtedoxa heitzana – Gabon
3. Lecomtedoxa klaineana – Cameroon, Gabon
4. Lecomtedoxa nogo – Gabon
5. Lecomtedoxa plumosa – Cameroon
6. Lecomtedoxa saint-aubinii – Gabon
