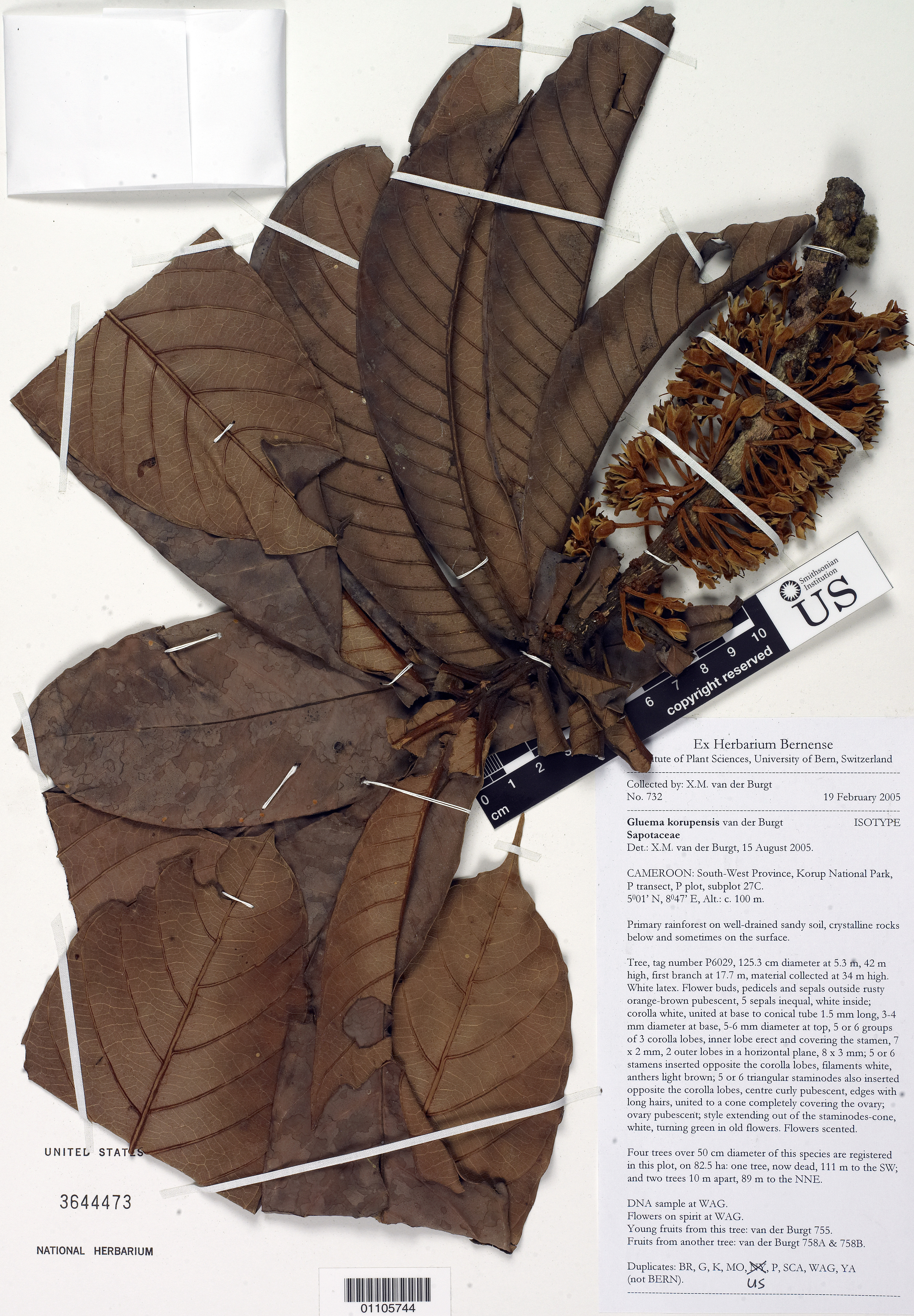

Conservation status
- Endangered (IUCN 3.1)

Scientific classification
- Kingdom: Plantae
- Clade: Tracheophytes
- Clade: Angiosperms
- Clade: Eudicots
- Clade: Asterids
- Order: Ericales
- Family: Sapotaceae
- Genus: Gluema
- Species: G. korupensis

Binomial name
- Gluema korupensis Burgt

= Gluema korupensis =

Species of tree

Gluema korupensis is a species of tree in the family Sapotaceae. It is found mostly in Korup National Park in southwestern Cameroon.

== Description ==
The description of the tree is that it can up to 42 meters tall. The wood has a reddish-brown color and has a density of 0.92 g/ cm3. The bark is light brown with some darker brown, irregularly shaped flakes. The fruit of the tree is covered on hair. The seeds are brown, glossy, and have a seed scar across the entire seed.
