= Rudolph Scheffer =

Dutch botanist (1844–1880)

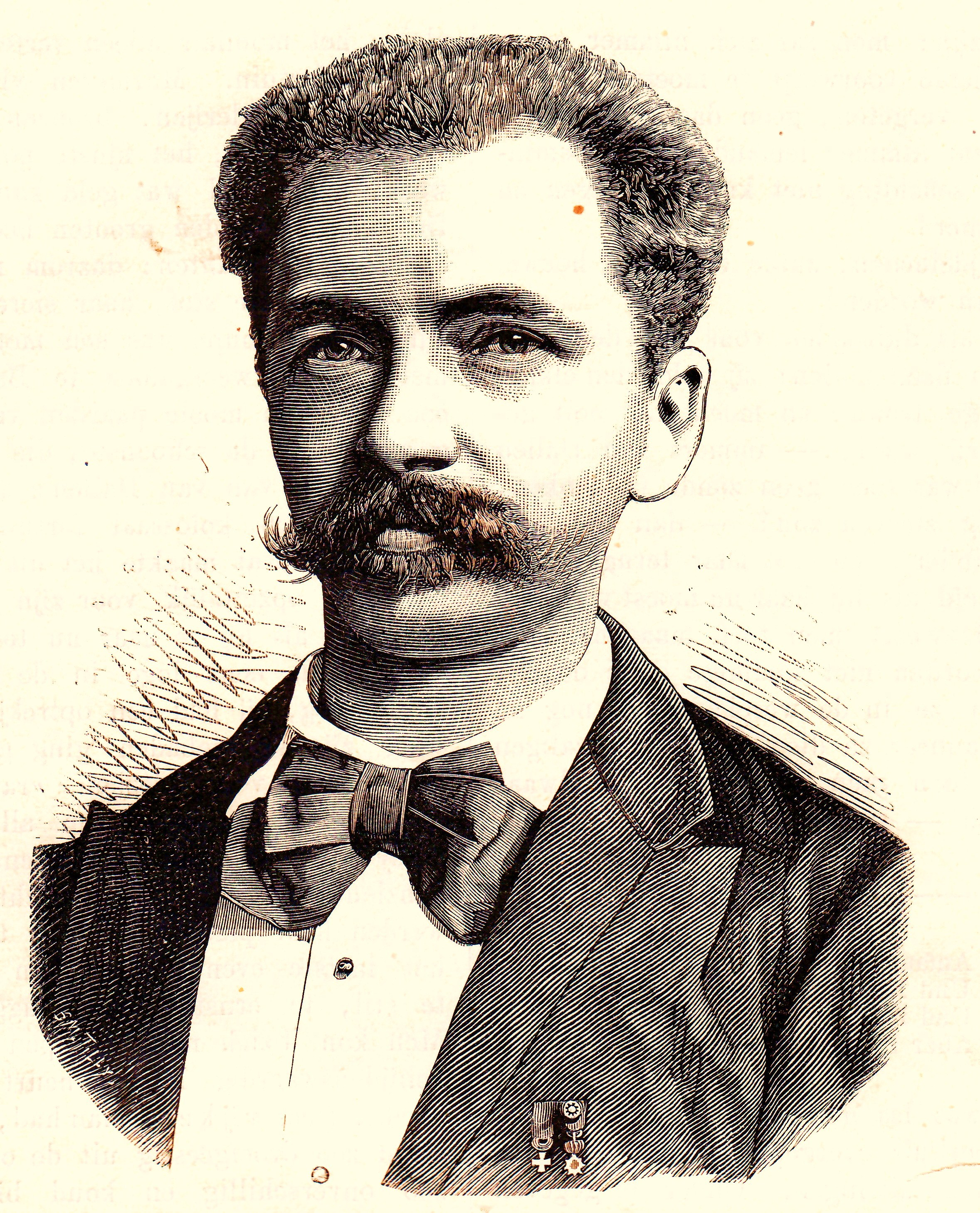
Rudolph H.C.C. Scheffer

Rudolph Herman Christiaan Carel Scheffer (12 September 1844 in Spaarndam, Netherlands – 1880 in Singaraja, West Java, Dutch East Indies (now Indonesia)) was a Dutch botanist and director of Buitenzorg Botanical Garden. The standard author abbreviation Scheff. is used to indicate this person as the author when citing a botanical name.

== Biography ==
Schefferd received his education at the University of Utrecht on medicine and mathematics and physics, where he graduated in 1864. His professor Miquel suggested Scheffer for the post of director of the botanical garden at Buitenzorg. In the National Herbarium in Leiden, he immersed himself in the specification of plant families. On March 20, Scheffer complete his doctor degree in mathematics and physics on the dissertation the Myrsinaceis Archipelagi Indici. That same year he received a scholarship from the Dutch government to Kew Gardens in London and visit to Jardin des Plantes in Paris.

Following his graduation in 1868, travelled to Java in the Dutch East Indies and took the directorship of 's Lands Plantentuin te Buitenzorg (today: Bogor Botanical Garden). In 1876 he founded the "economic garden" in Tjikeumeuh, some distance away from Buitenzorg. where he experimented and cultivated various culture crops on a large scale. On that same year he published "Annales du Jardin Botanique de Buitenzorg". At the instruction of Dutch administration he founded the school of agriculture at Buitenzorg (landbouwschool te Buitenzorg) for native population and also finished the layout of the "mountain garden" at Tjibodas, which was started by Johannes Elias Teijsmann.

He is commemorated with the botanical genera Schefferella Pierre (synonym Burckella; family Sapotaceae) and Schefferomitra Diels (family Annonaceae). As a taxonomist, he circumscribed the genera Gronophyllum, Heterospathe, Maniltoa and Rhopaloblaste. He died in 1880, while he was serving as director of Buitenzorg Botanical Gardens.

== Published works ==
- "Commentatio de myrsinaceis archipelagi Indici", 1867.
- "De myrsinaceis archipelagi Indici", 1867.
- "Observationes phytographicae", 1869–72.
- "Het Geslacht Diplanthera Banks et Sol.", 1870.
