= Vitellariopsis cuneata =

Conservation status
- Vulnerable (IUCN 2.3)

Scientific classification
- Kingdom: Plantae
- Clade: Tracheophytes
- Clade: Angiosperms
- Clade: Eudicots
- Clade: Asterids
- Order: Ericales
- Family: Sapotaceae
- Genus: Vitellariopsis
- Species: V. cuneata

Binomial name
- Vitellariopsis cuneata (Engl.) Aubrév.

Synonyms
- Austromimusops cuneata (Engl.) A.Meeuse; Mimusops cuneata Engl.

Species of flowering plant

Vitellariopsis cuneata is a species of plant in the family Sapotaceae. It is endemic to Tanzania.
