= Isonandra montana =

Scientific classification
- Kingdom: Plantae
- Clade: Tracheophytes
- Clade: Angiosperms
- Clade: Eudicots
- Clade: Asterids
- Order: Ericales
- Family: Sapotaceae
- Genus: Isonandra
- Species: I. montana

Binomial name
- Isonandra montana (Thwaites) Gamble

Synonyms
- Isonandra lanceolata var. montana (Thwaites) Thwaites; Isonandra wightiana var. montana Thwaites

Species of tree

Isonandra montana is a plant species first described in 1860.

Isonandra montana is a small tree up to 10 meters tall, native to Sri Lanka and possibly to the Western Ghats of India.

The Latin specific epithet montana refers to mountains or coming from mountains.
