= Gluema =

Scientific classification
- Kingdom: Plantae
- Clade: Tracheophytes
- Clade: Angiosperms
- Clade: Eudicots
- Clade: Asterids
- Order: Ericales
- Family: Sapotaceae
- Subfamily: Sapotoideae
- Genus: Gluema; Aubrév. & Pellegr.

Genus of flowering plants

Gluema is a genus of plant in family Sapotaceae described as a genus in 1935.

Gluema is native to tropical western and west-central Africa.

== Species ==
1. Gluema ivorensis Aubrév. & Pellegr. - Ivory Coast, Ghana, Cameroon, Gabon
2. Gluema korupensis Burgt - Cameroon
