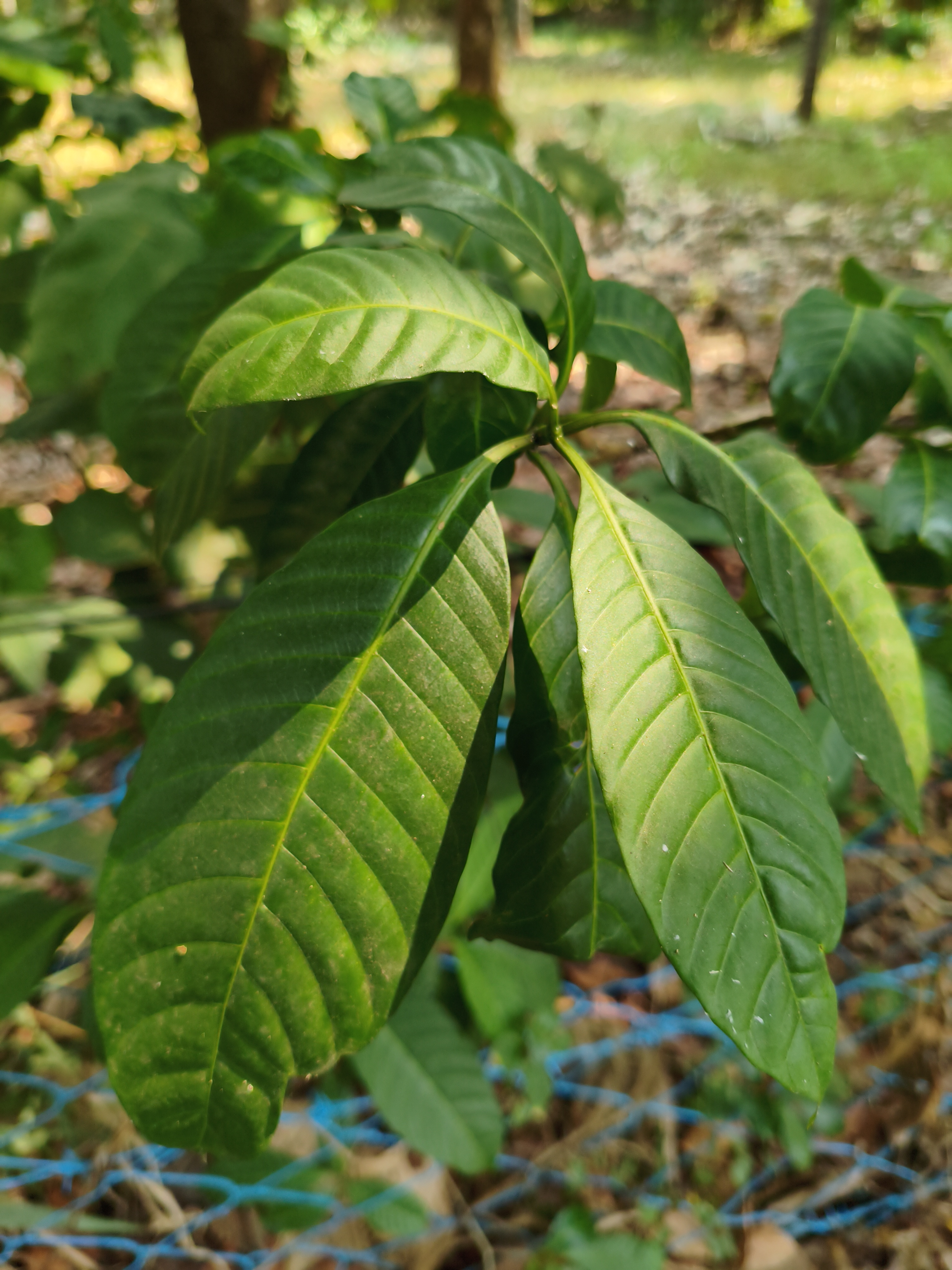
- In Kerala, India

Conservation status
- Least Concern (IUCN 3.1)

Scientific classification
- Kingdom: Plantae
- Clade: Tracheophytes
- Clade: Angiosperms
- Clade: Eudicots
- Clade: Asterids
- Order: Ericales
- Family: Sapotaceae
- Genus: Isonandra
- Species: I. lanceolata

Binomial name
- Isonandra lanceolata Wight

Synonyms
- Bassia wightiana (A.DC.) Bedd.; Isonandra gracilis H.J.Lam; Isonandra wightiana A.DC.

= Isonandra lanceolata =

Species of plant

Isonandra lanceolata is a species of plant in the family Sapotaceae. The specific epithet lanceolata means 'spear-shaped', referring to the leaves.

== Description ==
Isonandra lanceolata grows as a shrub or small tree or as a larger tree up to 26 metres (90 ft) tall with a trunk diameter of up to 46 cm (18 in). The bark is chocolate brown. Inflorescences bear up to 10 pale yellow flowers.

== Distribution and habitat ==
Isonandra lanceolata is native to Tamil Nadu (India), Sri Lanka and Borneo. It grows in forests up to 2,000 m (7,000 ft) altitude.
