= Isonandra stocksii =

Conservation status
- Endangered (IUCN 2.3)

Scientific classification
- Kingdom: Plantae
- Clade: Tracheophytes
- Clade: Angiosperms
- Clade: Eudicots
- Clade: Asterids
- Order: Ericales
- Family: Sapotaceae
- Genus: Isonandra
- Species: I. stocksii

Binomial name
- Isonandra stocksii C.B.Clarke in J.D.Hooker

Species of flowering plant

Isonandra stocksii is a species of plant in the family Sapotaceae. It is a tree endemic to southern India. It is threatened by habitat loss.
