= Burckella =

Scientific classification
- Kingdom: Plantae
- Clade: Tracheophytes
- Clade: Angiosperms
- Clade: Eudicots
- Clade: Asterids
- Order: Ericales
- Family: Sapotaceae
- Subfamily: Sapotoideae
- Genus: Burckella; Pierre

Type species
- Burckella obovata (G. Forst.) Pierre

Synonyms
- Schefferella Pierre; Cassidispermum Hemsl.; Chelonespermum Hemsl.

Genus of flowering plants

Burckella is a genus of plants in the family Sapotaceae, described as a genus in 1890. It is named for the Dutch botanist William Burck.

Burckella is native to New Guinea, the Indonesian province of Maluku, and the islands of Papuasia east of New Guinea.

Species

1. Burckella banikiensis - Solomon Islands
2. Burckella erythrophylla - Papua New Guinea
3. Burckella fijiensis - Fiji
4. Burckella hillii - Fiji
5. Burckella macropoda - Papua New Guinea
6. Burckella magusum - West New Guinea
7. Burckella obovata - Maluku, New Guinea, Solomon Islands, Bismarck Archipelago, Vanuatu
8. Burckella parvifolia - Fiji
9. Burckella polymera - West New Guinea
10. Burckella poolei - Maluku, New Guinea
11. Burckella richii - Fiji, Tonga, Samoa
12. Burckella sorei - Solomon Islands
13. Burckella thurstonii - Fiji
