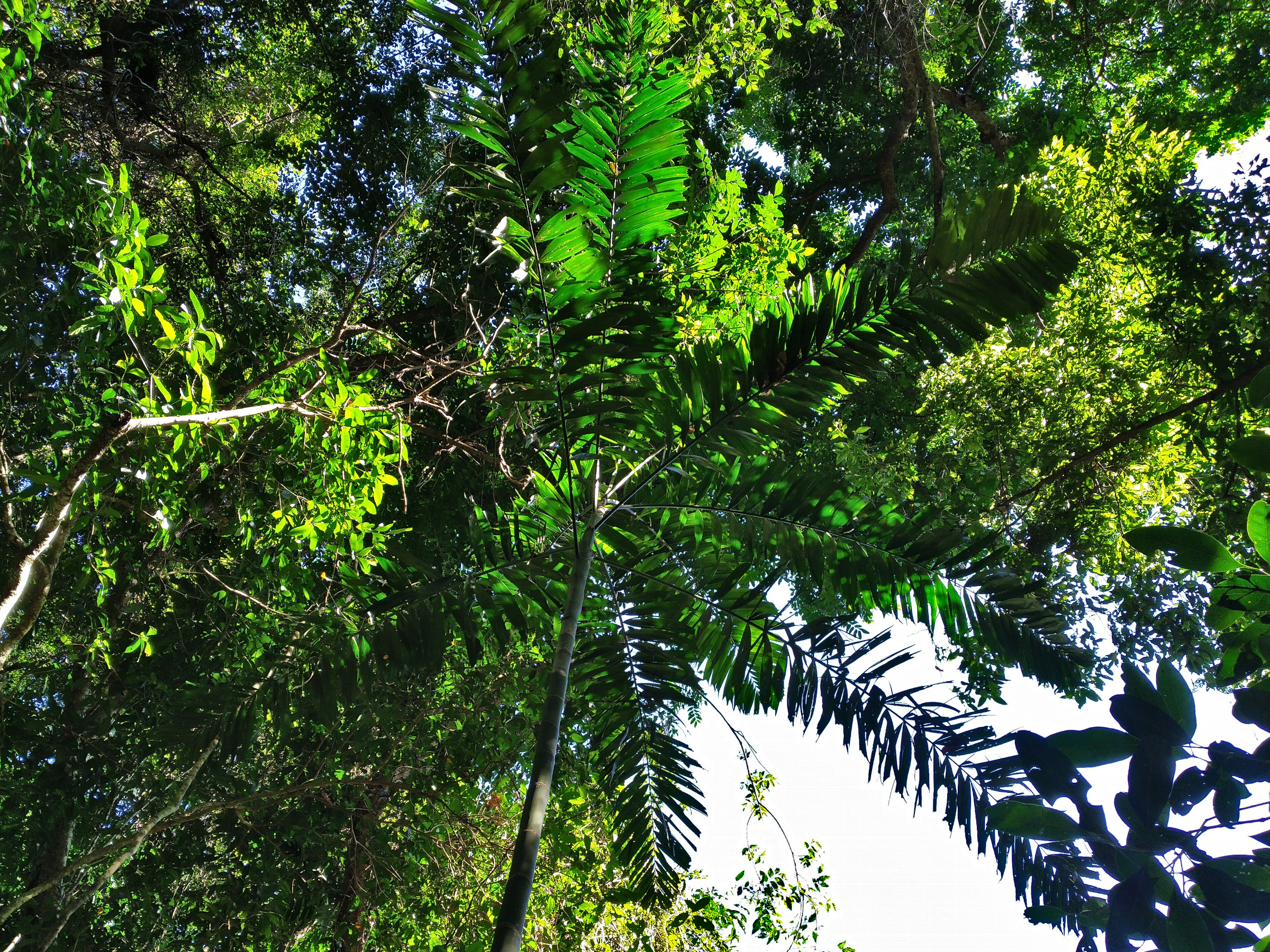

Conservation status
- Least Concern (IUCN 3.1)

Scientific classification
- Kingdom: Plantae
- Clade: Tracheophytes
- Clade: Angiosperms
- Clade: Monocots
- Clade: Commelinids
- Order: Arecales
- Family: Arecaceae
- Genus: Hydriastele
- Species: H. wendlandiana

Binomial name
- Hydriastele wendlandiana (F.Muell.) H.Wendl. & Drude

Synonyms
- Adelonenga geelvinkiana (Becc.) Becc.; Adelonenga microspadix (Warb. ex K.Schum. & Lauterb.) Becc.; Hydriastele beccariana Burret; Hydriastele carrii Burret; Hydriastele douglasiana F.M.Bailey; Hydriastele geelvinkiana (Becc.) Burret; Hydriastele lepidota Burret; Hydriastele microspadix (Warb. ex K.Schum. & Lauterb.) Burret; Hydriastele rostrata Burret; Hydriastele wendlandiana var. microcarpa H.Wendl. & Drude; Kentia wendlandiana F.Muell.; Nenga geelvinkiana Becc.

= Hydriastele wendlandiana =

Wendland's palm

Species of flowering plant

Hydriastele wendlandiana, commonly known as Wendland's palm, cat o' nine tails, creek palm or kentia palm, is a tall, multi-stemmed tree in the palm family Arecaceae. It is native to New Guinea and the Australian states of Queensland and the Northern Territory.

== Description ==
H. wendlandiana grows to a height of 25 m (82 ft) with 3 to 7 stems up to 12 cm (4.7 in) in diameter. The sparse crown has 5 to 10 paripinnate fronds measuring up to 2 m (6 ft 7 in) in length, with up to 20 praemorse pinnae (leaflets), on either side of the slightly arching rachis (midrib). The leaflets are sessile and irregularly spaced, and may be up to 45 cm (18 in) long by 6 cm (2.4 in) wide, dark green on the upper surface and lighter below. The apical leaflets are merged at the base and are much broader than the rest.

The species is monoecious, that is, it has both staminate (functionally male) and pistillate (functionally female) flowers on the one plant. The inflorescence emerges from the trunk at the base of the crownshaft and resembles a cat o' nine tails, having 10–20 straight spikes around 20 cm (7.9 in) long. The spikes are initially erect but become pendulous as the fruit develops. The flowers are arranged in groups of 3, with two staminate flowers either side of a pistillate flower. The staminate flowers are 4 mm (0.16 in) in diameter and 9 mm (0.35 in) long, the pistillate flowers are more or less conical to globose and up to 3 mm (0.12 in) in diameter.

The fruits may be orange, purple or various shades of red. They are ovoid to globose, about 10 mm (0.39 in) in diameter with a single 8 mm (0.31 in) globose seed.

== Taxonomy ==
The species was first described as Kentia wendlandiana in 1870 by the German-Australian botanist Ferdinand von Mueller in his work Fragmenta Phytographiae Australiae. Very shortly after, in 1875, it was renamed Hydriastele wendlandiana by Hermann Wendland and Oscar Drude, who erected the genus Hydriastele in the journal Linnaea.

=== Etymology ===
The genus name Hydriastele derives from the Ancient Greek ὑδρο- (hudro-), meaning water, and στήλη (stḗlē), meaning column. It refers to the plant's preference for growing in or near swamps.

The species epithet wendlandiana is in honour of the German botanist Hermann Wendland who was a noted authority on Arecaceae.

== Distribution and habitat ==
Wendland's palm is found throughout New Guinea and the Aru Islands, and in the northernmost parts of the Northern Territory (from Bathurst Island, Melville Island and Croker Island, across the Top End to Groote Eylandt in the Gulf of Carpentaria), and then into Queensland from Cape York Peninsula down the east coast to Mission Beach, where it grows on various soil types in rainforest, monsoon forest and swamp forest, often in or close to swamps, at altitudes from sea level to 200 m (660 ft).

== Ecology ==
Fruits of Wendland's palm are eaten by fruit doves, metallic starlings and cassowaries.

== Gallery ==
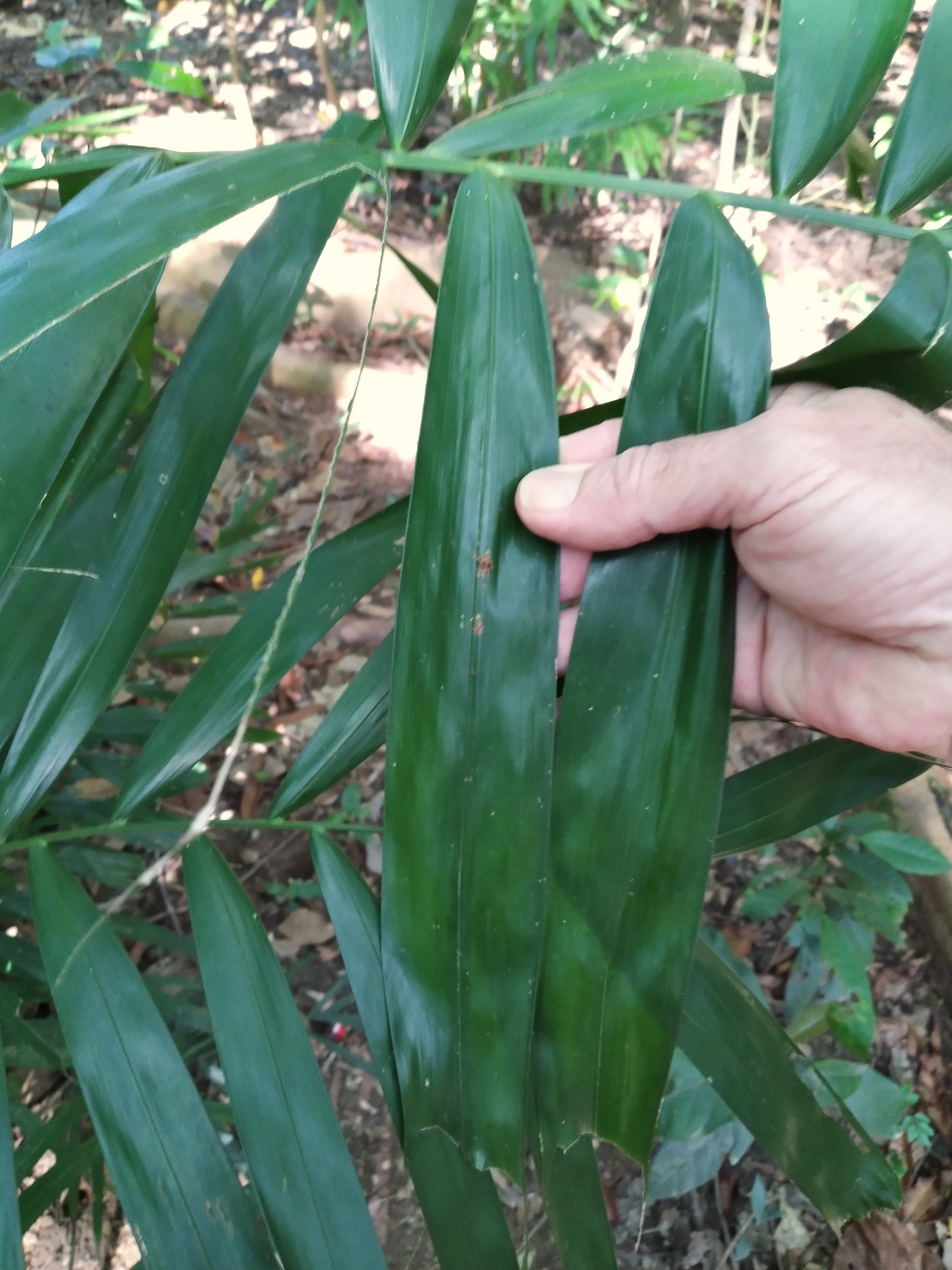
Leaflets, showing irregular spacing and truncated tips

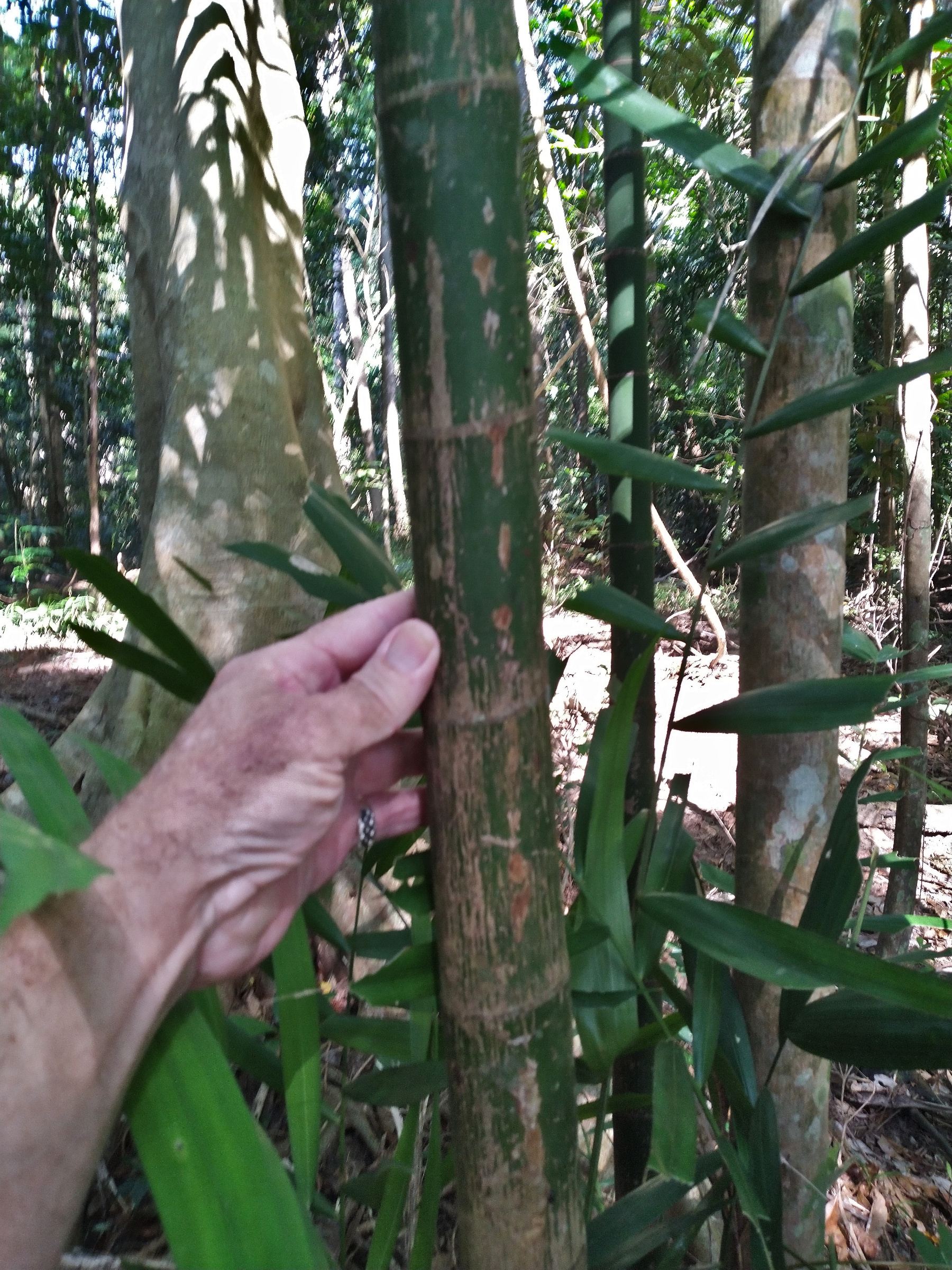
The slender trunk

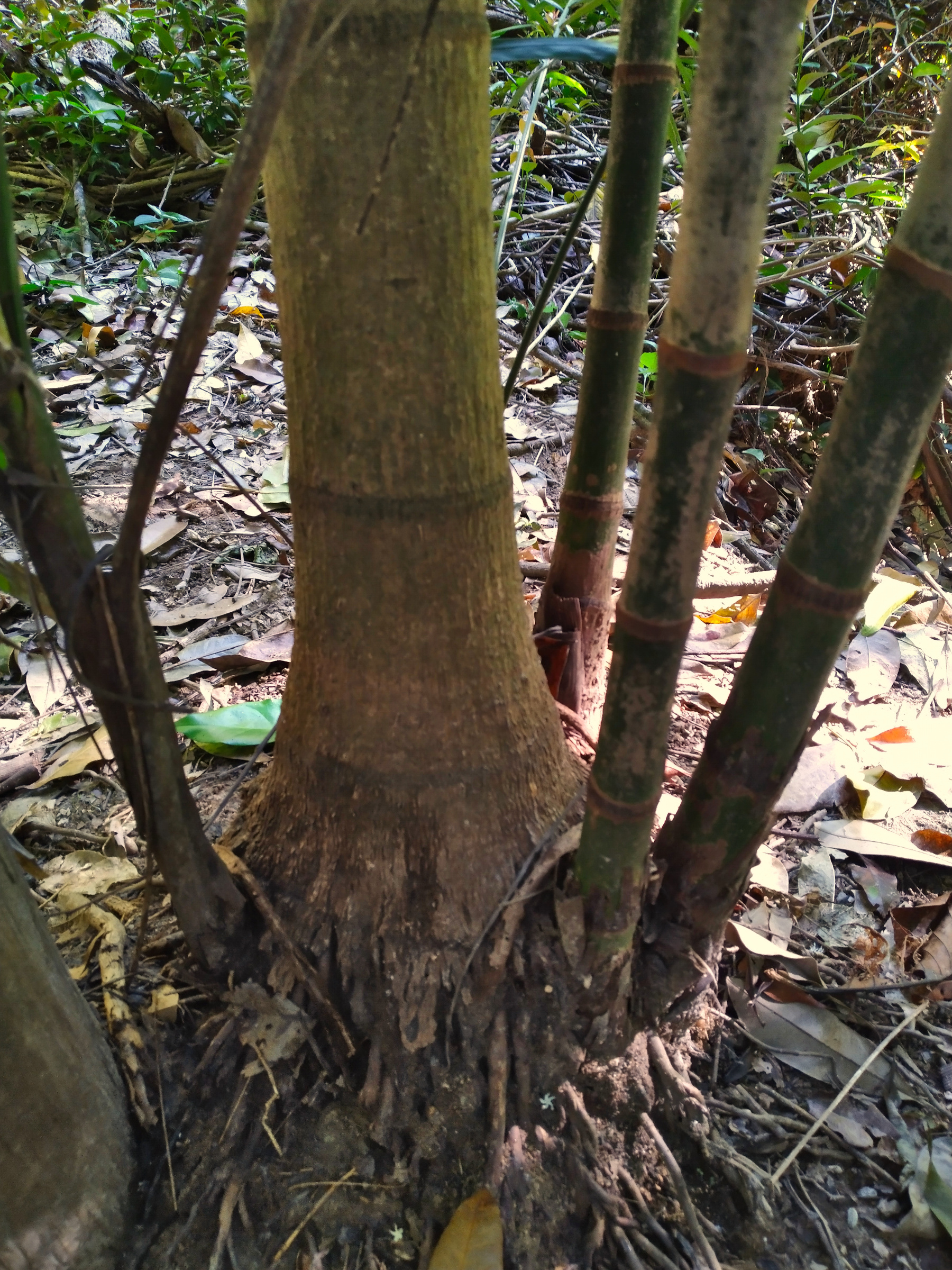
Base of the tree, with emerging suckers
