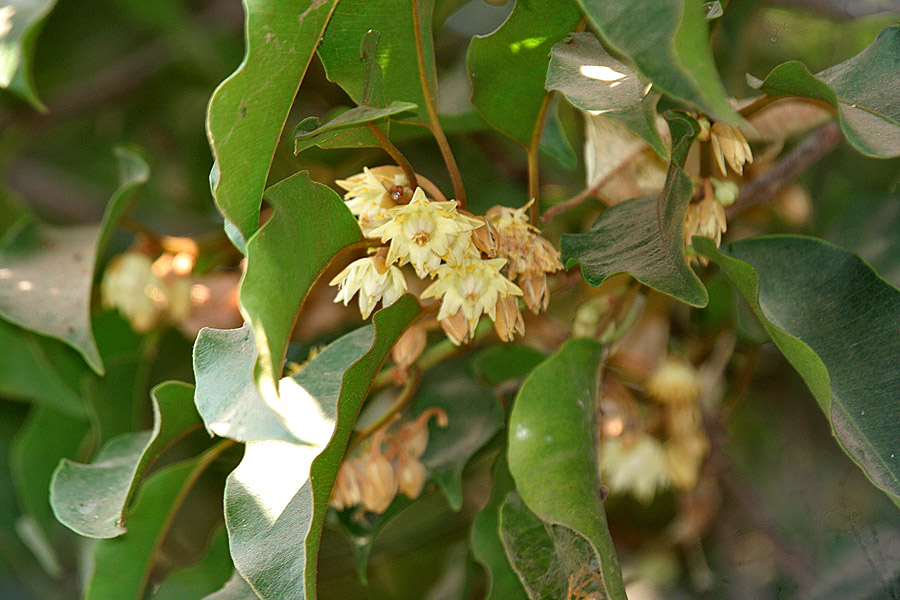
- Mimusops elengi

Scientific classification
- Kingdom: Plantae
- Clade: Tracheophytes
- Clade: Angiosperms
- Clade: Eudicots
- Clade: Asterids
- Order: Ericales
- Family: Sapotaceae
- Subfamily: Sapotoideae; Eaton

Type genus
- Sapota Mill.

Genera
- See text

= Sapotoideae =

Subfamily of flowering plants

The Sapotoideae are a subfamily of the flowering plant family Sapotaceae. Plants in the subfamily are characterized by their leather-like leaves, often growing in a stipule fashion.

The seeds of the tree Argania spinosa produce an edible oil, traditionally harvested in Morocco.

== Genera ==
Genera accepted by the Germplasm Resources Information Network as of December 2022:

- Argania Roem. & Schult.
- Autranella A.Chev.
- Baillonella Pierre
- Bemangidia L.Gaut.
- Burckella Pierre
- Capurodendron Aubrév.
- Diploknema Pierre
- Faucherea Lecomte
- Gluema Aubrév. & Pellegr.
- Inhambanella (Engl.) Dubard
- Isonandra Wight
- Labourdonnaisia Bojer
- Labramia A.DC.
- Lecomtedoxa (Pierre ex Engl.) Dubard
- Letestua Lecomte
- Madhuca Ham. ex J.F.Gmel.
- Manilkara Adans.
- Mimusops L.
- Neohemsleya T.D.Penn.
- Neolemonniera Heine
- Nesoluma Baill.
- Northia Hook.f.
- Palaquium Blanco
- Payena A.DC.
- Sideroxylon L.
- Tieghemella Pierre
- Tsebona Capuron
- Vitellaria C.F.Gaertn.
- Vitellariopsis Baill. ex Dubard
