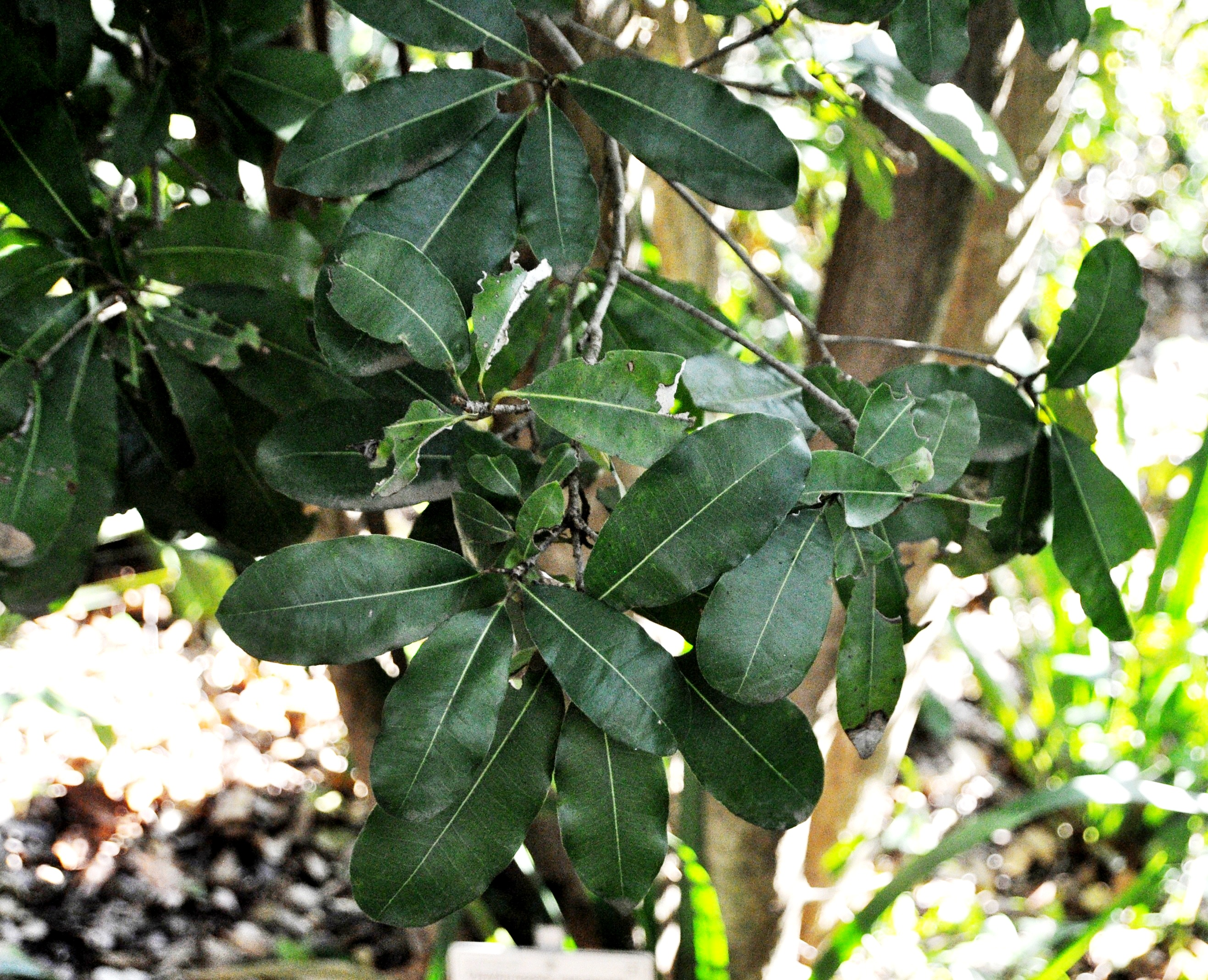

Scientific classification
- Kingdom: Plantae
- Clade: Tracheophytes
- Clade: Angiosperms
- Clade: Eudicots
- Clade: Asterids
- Order: Ericales
- Family: Sapotaceae
- Genus: Vitellariopsis
- Species: V. marginata

Binomial name
- Vitellariopsis marginata (N.E.Br.) Aubrév. (1963)

Synonyms
- Austromimusops marginata (N.E.Br.) A.Meeuse (1960); Austromimusops sylvestris (S.Moore) A.Meeuse (1960); Baillonella marginata (N.E.Br.) Baehni (1965); Baillonella sylvestris (S.Moore) Baehni (1965); Inhambanella natalensis (Schinz) Dubard (1915); Mimusops marginata N.E.Br. (1895); Mimusops natalensis Schinz (1896); Mimusops schinzii Engl. (1904), nom. illeg.; Mimusops sylvestris S.Moore (1911); Vitellariopsis sylvestris (S.Moore) Aubrév. (1963)

= Vitellariopsis marginata =

Forest bush-milkwood

Species of flowering plant

Vitellariopsis marginata is a species of plant in the family Sapotaceae. It is a shrub or tree native to Mozambique, South Africa, and Eswatini.
