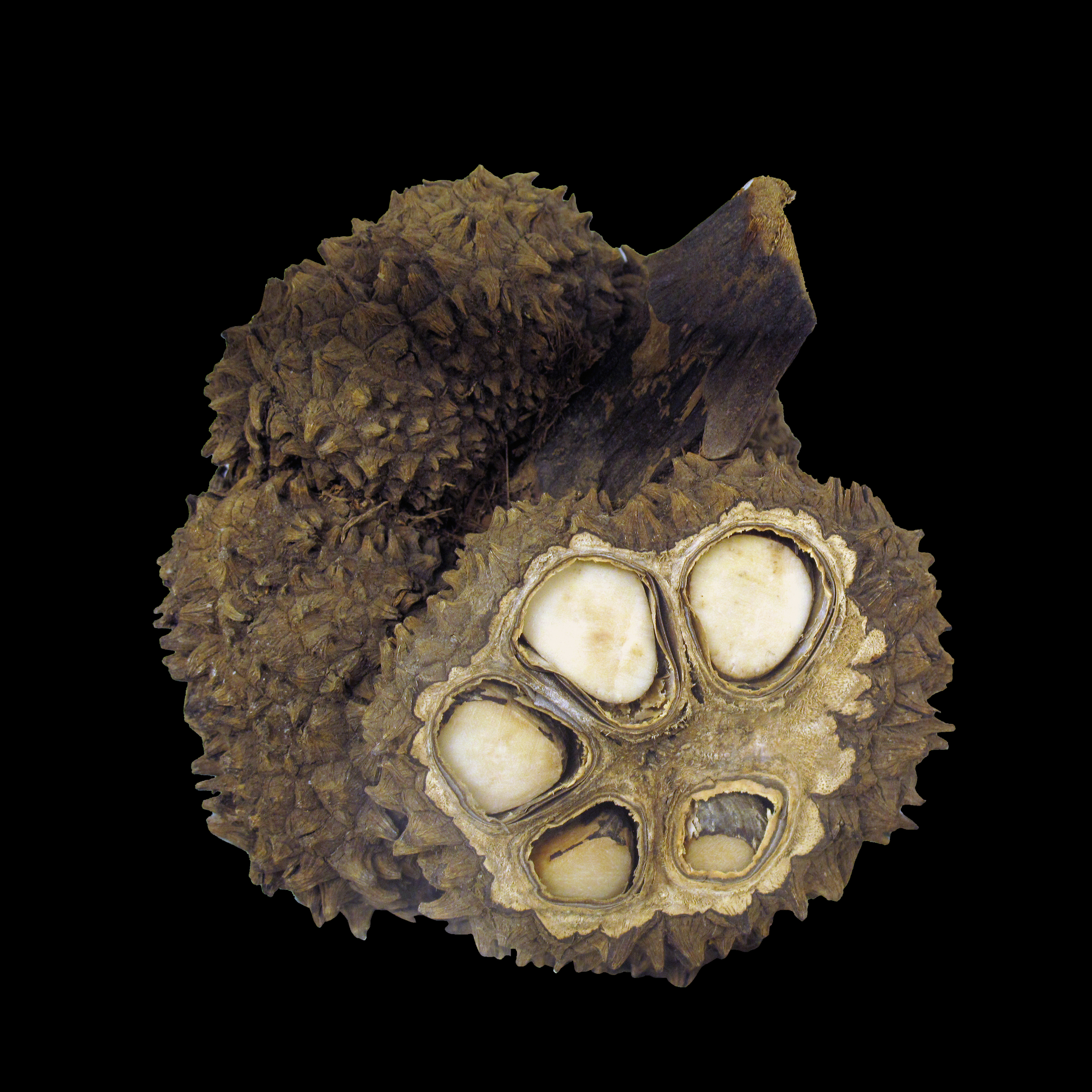
- Specimen of Phytelephas seemannii found in the riparian forest of Rio Guanxhez, Colón Province, Panama

Conservation status
- Conservation Dependent (IUCN 2.3)

Scientific classification
- Kingdom: Plantae
- Clade: Embryophytes
- Clade: Tracheophytes
- Clade: Spermatophytes
- Clade: Angiosperms
- Clade: Monocots
- Clade: Commelinids
- Order: Arecales
- Family: Arecaceae
- Genus: Phytelephas
- Species: P. seemannii

Binomial name
- Phytelephas seemannii O.F.Cook 1912

Subspecies
- Phytelephas seemannii subsp. brevipes; Phytelephas seemannii subsp. seemannii

Synonyms
- Phytelephas ruizii Gaudichaud (nomen nudum)

= Phytelephas seemannii =

Species of palm

Phytelephas seemannii, commonly called Panama ivory palm, is a species of flowering plant in the family Arecaceae. It is one of the plants used for vegetable ivory.

== Names ==
The species epithet seemannii honors botanist Berthold Carl Seemann who collected some of the first specimens, including the lectotype. In Spanish it is called cabeza de negra ('black head'), palma de marfil ('ivory palm'), and tagua. In Colombian Spanish it is additionally known as allagua. In Guna it is sam, or sagu. In both the Quechua and Choco languages it is called anta.

== Habitat ==
Phytelephas seemannii is native to Colombia and Panama, with much of it growing in shaded areas by rivers in lowland rainforest in Colombia's Pacific/Chocó natural region. It is usually found at elevations from 0–1,000 metres (0–3,281 ft) in semi-deciduous forests.

== Subspecies ==
Phytelephas seemannii has two subspecies, P. s. ssp. brevipes and P. s. ssp. seemannii. P. s. ssp. brevipes is endemic to the upper Mamoní Valley in Panama, at or below 500 metres (1,600 ft) in elevation, and may be a hybrid of P. seemannii and P. macrocarpa.

== Description ==
Phytelephas seemannii most closely resembles Phytelephas macrocarpa. However, the former has leaves that have fewer pinnae which are larger. Its trunk is also not upright but "creeping" and decumbent. The tree is generally less than 1 metre (3 ft 3 in) tall, with inflorescences below the 0.5 metres (1 ft 8 in) mark. Its spathes are double instead of in threes or fours. On the male flowers are only 36 stamens and not the hundreds of other species. The heads contain fewer fruits than other species, but inside are more nuts that are larger. Typically each fruit has 5 seeds protected by a 1 centimetre (0.39 in) fibrous coat, and each inflorescence has up to 8 fruits. Each tree can have dozens of inflorescences at a time.

In immature seeds, the endosperm is a liquid, like in a coconut, and then later it hardens as the fruit wall softens and deteriorates.

== Ecology ==
Panama ivory palm trees flower after the end of the dry season, between February and May. The flowers are pollinated by insects, specifically by two types of rove beetles, pollen-eating Amazoncharis spp. and their predators in the genus Xanthopygus. The Amazoncharis beetles hollow out egg chambers within the male inflorescence, similar to how beetles in the related subtribe Gyrophaenina do inside of mushrooms. Squirrels and agoutis will eat the fleshy inner mesocarp surrounding the endocarp of the fruit, but do not eat the extremely hard endosperm. The rock-hard endosperm also makes the seed immune from most insect pests. Seed dispersers include the Central American agouti (Dasyprocta punctata), and lowland paca (Agouti paca).

== Uses ==
The seeds are traded at a regional international level as vegetable ivory, which is also called tagua. This commercial use is a threat to the species, but progress is being made on using more sustainable practices and conservation. As the tree typically grows only 1 metre (3 ft 3 in) tall, it was not chopped down to harvest the seeds as was done with Phytelephas aequatorialis at the peak of tagua harvesting.

The jelly-like liquid in the immature seeds, which later turns into the vegetable ivory, is edible. Occasionally in the marketplaces of Guna Yala the thin crust surrounding the ivory is sold as food.

In Colombia the fronds are sometimes used for thatch.
