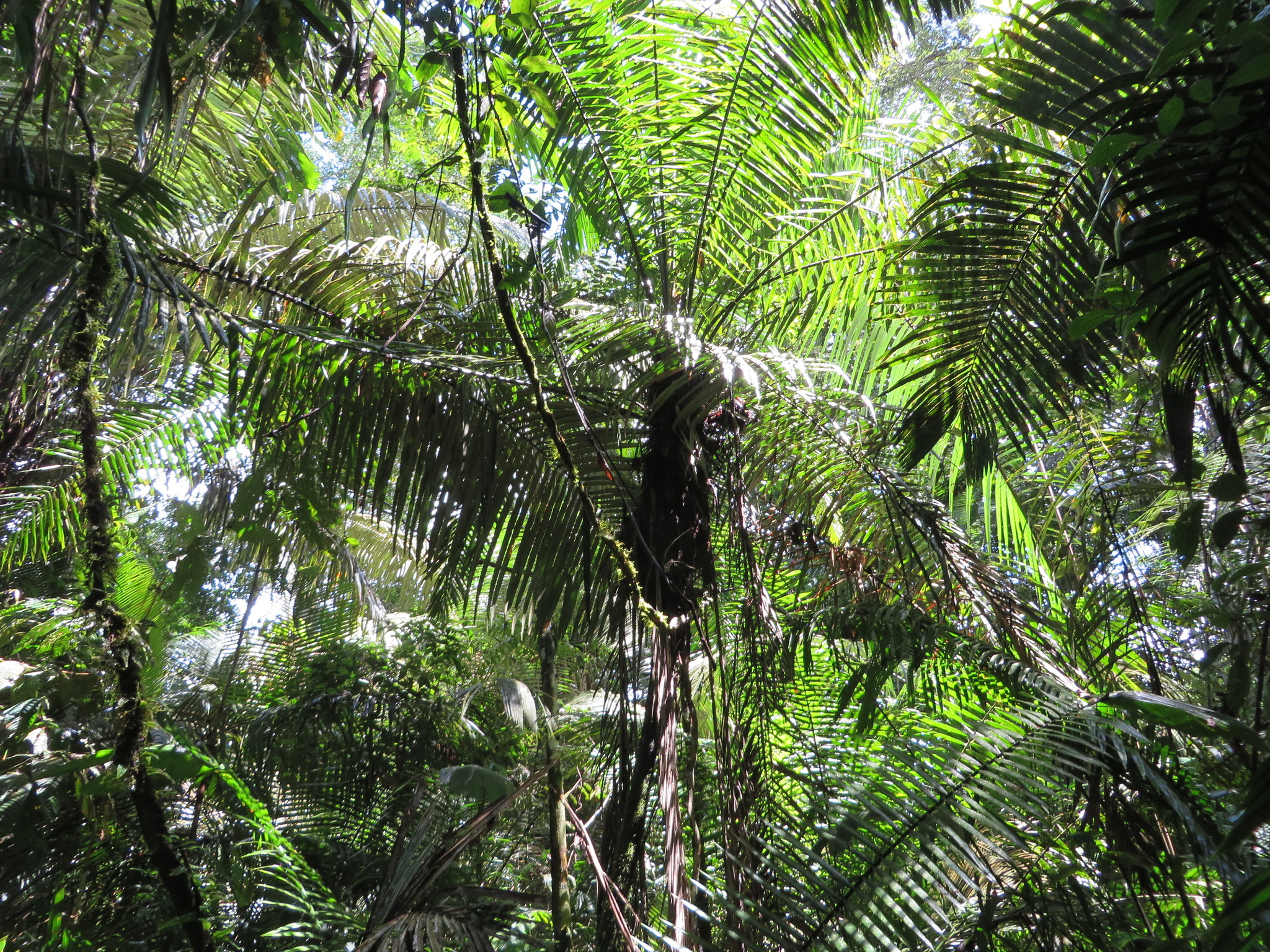

Scientific classification
- Kingdom: Plantae
- Clade: Tracheophytes
- Clade: Angiosperms
- Clade: Monocots
- Clade: Commelinids
- Order: Arecales
- Family: Arecaceae
- Genus: Phytelephas
- Species: P. tenuicaulis

Binomial name
- Phytelephas tenuicaulis (Barfod) A. J. Hend. 1995

Synonyms
- Phytelephas macrocarpa subsp. tenuicaulis Barfod

= Phytelephas tenuicaulis =

Species of palm

Phytelephas tenuicaulis is a species of palm in the genus Phytelephas. The compound leaves are around 7 meters in length, with stem diameters of 10 cm. Brown, ovulate fruits of about 6 cm are produced. Palms of the Phytelephas genus are also referred to as vegetable ivory palms.

== Distribution and habitat ==
Phytelephas tenuicaulis is distributed in Bolivia, Colombia, Ecuador, and Peru. The palms are distributed in the Amazon rainforest region in habitats of river plains and lowlands.

== Human uses ==
Both humans and other animals have used the fruits produced by this species as food. In Ecuador, humans also have used leaves such as domestic or construction tools. In Peru, stems have been used for fences and houses and fruits have been used as medicine.

== Phylogeny ==
Phytelephas, or the vegetable ivory palms, are dispersed across South America. The clade has a total of eight species, and Phytelephas branches off to have six species. The phylogenetic relationships are not completely understood, so it is unclear which species of the vegetable ivory palms that P. tenuicaulis is most closely related to. However, it is believed to be the sister species of P. aequatorialis and P. tumacana. Both are located in the rainforests of the Tumbes–Chocó–Magdalena biodiversity hotspot. However, despite the differences in biogeography, they are all solitary species and closely share characteristics in their flowers and pollination mechanisms.

Vicariance is one method to explain the distribution and differences in some of the vegetable ivory palms across South America. The main biogeographic barrier involved is the Andes Mountain range. During the Miocene period, the vicariance event that is believed to lead to biotic diversification is the Andes Uplift. Before the uplift, the present day Amazon, Magdalena, and Chocó Rainforests are believed to have been one large rainforest. This event impacted climate, species diversification, and furthermore, evolution. Today, Phytelephas tenuicaulis is considered one of the Amazonian species, whereas other palm species, P. aequatorialis and P. tumacana are of the Chocoan Rainforest region after the split.

== See also ==
- Chocó–Darién moist forests
