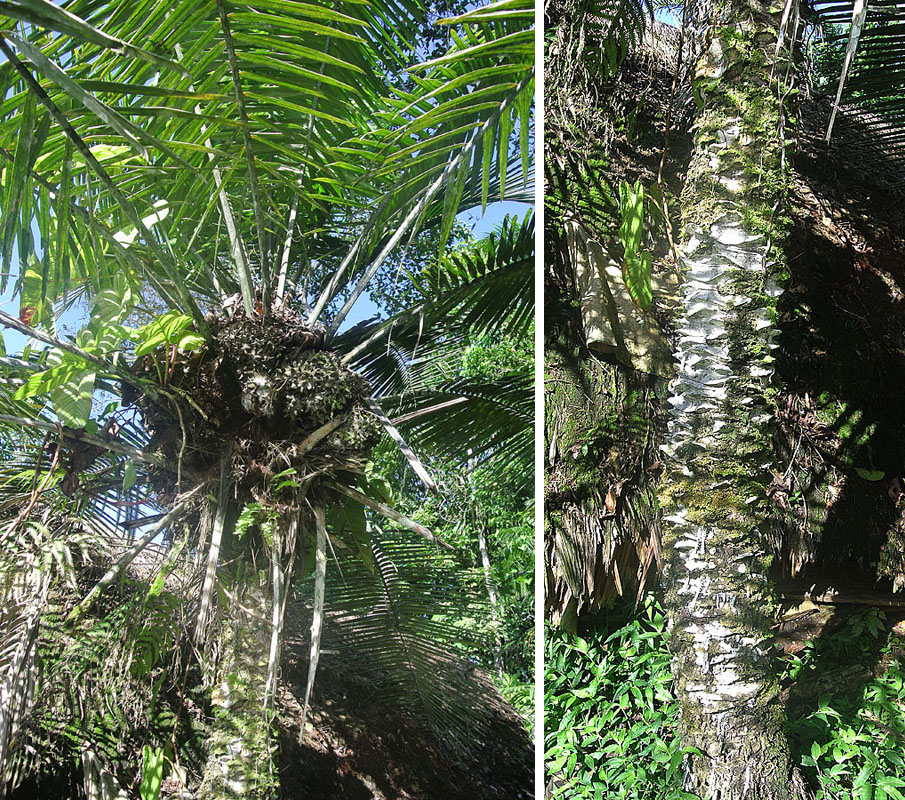
- Phytelephas macrocarpa

Scientific classification
- Kingdom: Plantae
- Clade: Tracheophytes
- Clade: Angiosperms
- Clade: Monocots
- Clade: Commelinids
- Order: Arecales
- Family: Arecaceae
- Subfamily: Ceroxyloideae
- Tribe: Phytelepheae; Horan.

Genera
- Ammandra; Aphandra; Phytelephas

= Phytelepheae =

Tribe of palms

Phytelepheae is a tribe of plants in the subfamily Ceroxyloideae of the family Arecaceae.

== Genera ==
Three genera are included in Phytelepeae:

- Ammandra
- Aphandra
- Phytelephas
