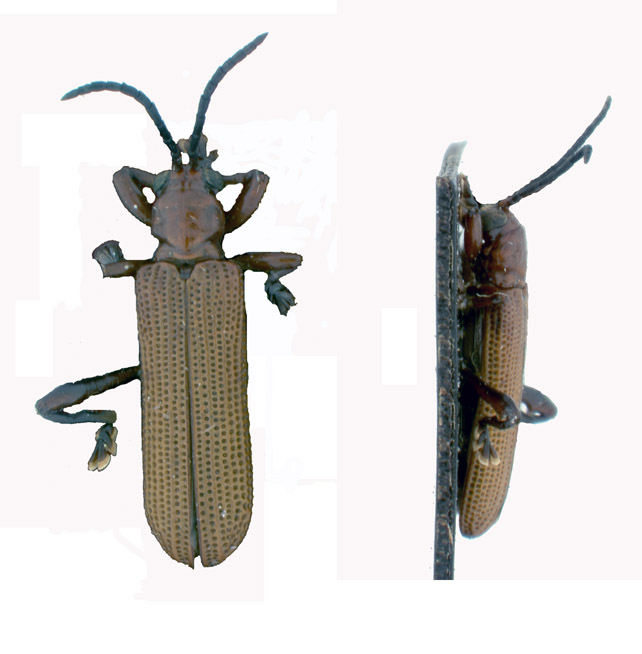

Scientific classification
- Kingdom: Animalia
- Phylum: Arthropoda
- Clade: Pancrustacea
- Class: Insecta
- Order: Coleoptera
- Suborder: Polyphaga
- Infraorder: Cucujiformia
- Family: Chrysomelidae
- Genus: Promecotheca
- Species: P. nuciferae

Binomial name
- Promecotheca nuciferae Maulik, 1929

= Promecotheca nuciferae =

Species of beetle

Promecotheca nuciferae is a species of beetle of the family Chrysomelidae. It is found in Indonesia (Sulawesi, Java, the Moluccas).

The recorded host plants for this species are Cocos nucifera, Areca catechu, Phytelephas macrocarpa and Phoenix species.
