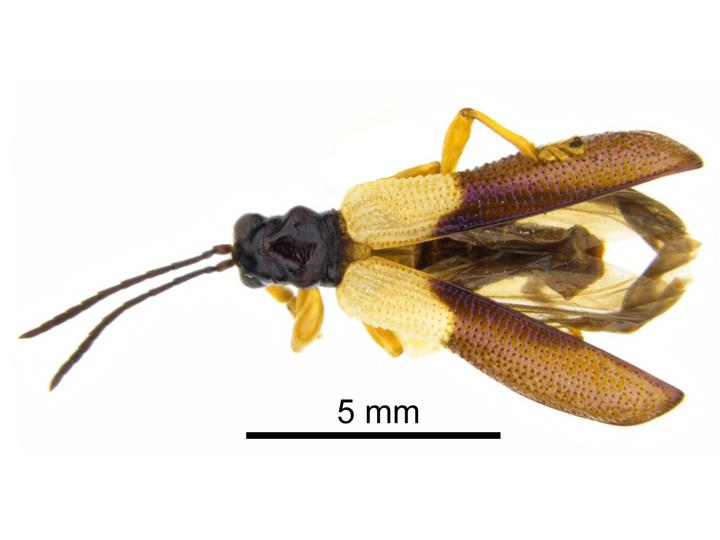

Scientific classification
- Kingdom: Animalia
- Phylum: Arthropoda
- Clade: Pancrustacea
- Class: Insecta
- Order: Coleoptera
- Suborder: Polyphaga
- Infraorder: Cucujiformia
- Family: Chrysomelidae
- Genus: Promecotheca
- Species: P. opacicollis

Binomial name
- Promecotheca opacicollis Gestro, 1897

= Promecotheca opacicollis =

Species of beetle

Promecotheca opacicollis, the New Hebrides coconut hispid, is a species of beetle of the family Chrysomelidae. It is found on the New Hebrides.

The recorded host plants for this species are Cocos nucifera, Areca catechu, Phoenix species, Phytelephas macrocarpa and Ravenala madagascariensis.
