= Vegetable ivory =

Ivory substitute made from the seeds of certain palm trees

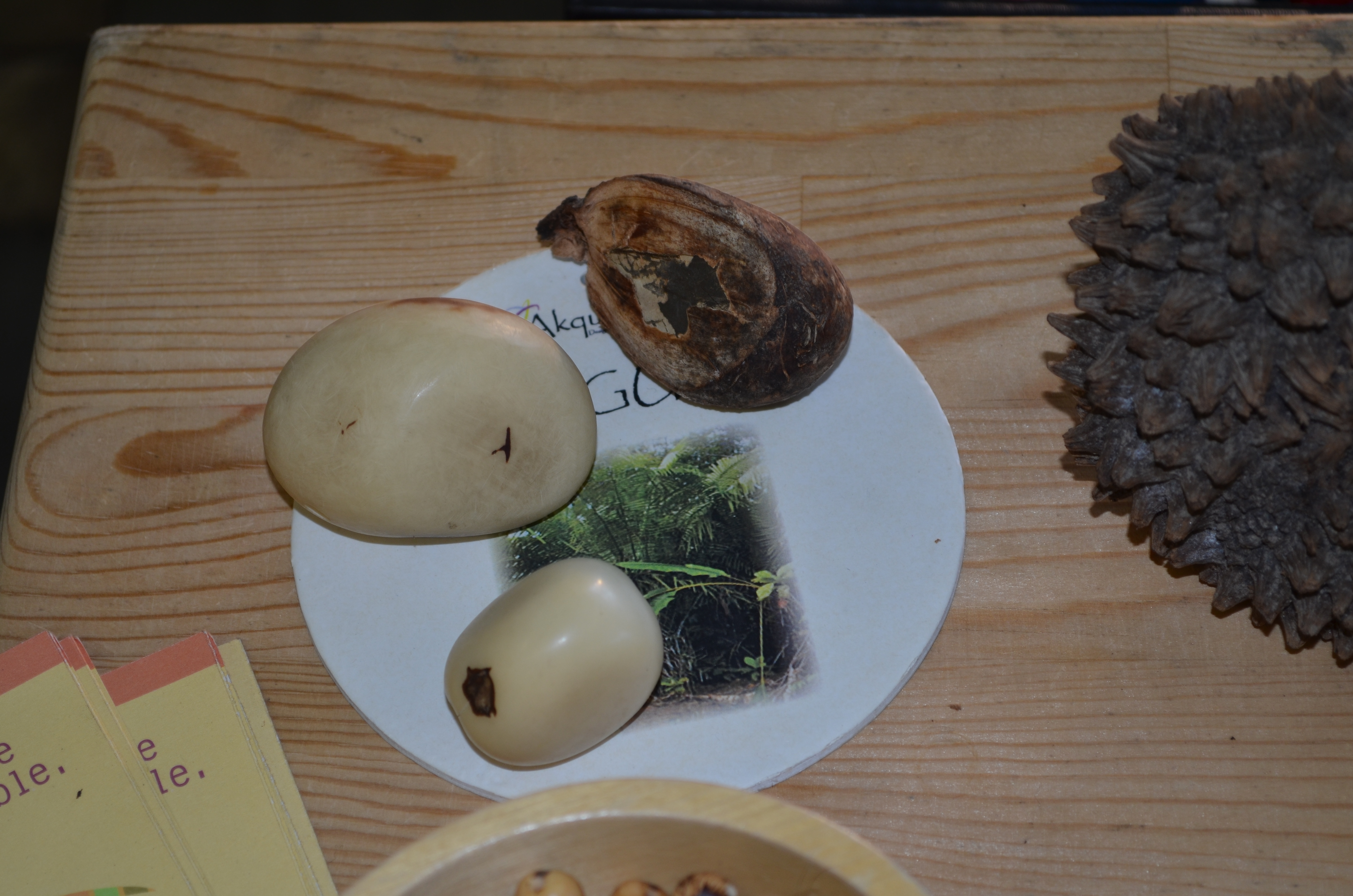

Tagua nuts before carving
Anticlockwise from right:
1. With pericarp
2. With brown skin
3. Without brown skin, partially sectioned to show hollow
4. Without brown skin, whole

Vegetable ivory or tagua nut is a product made from the very hard white endosperm of the seeds of certain palm trees. Vegetable ivory is named from its resemblance to animal ivory. Vegetable ivory is naturally white with a fine marbled grain structure. It can be dyed; dyeing often brings out the grain. It is commonly used in buttons, jewelry, and artistic carving.

== Location ==
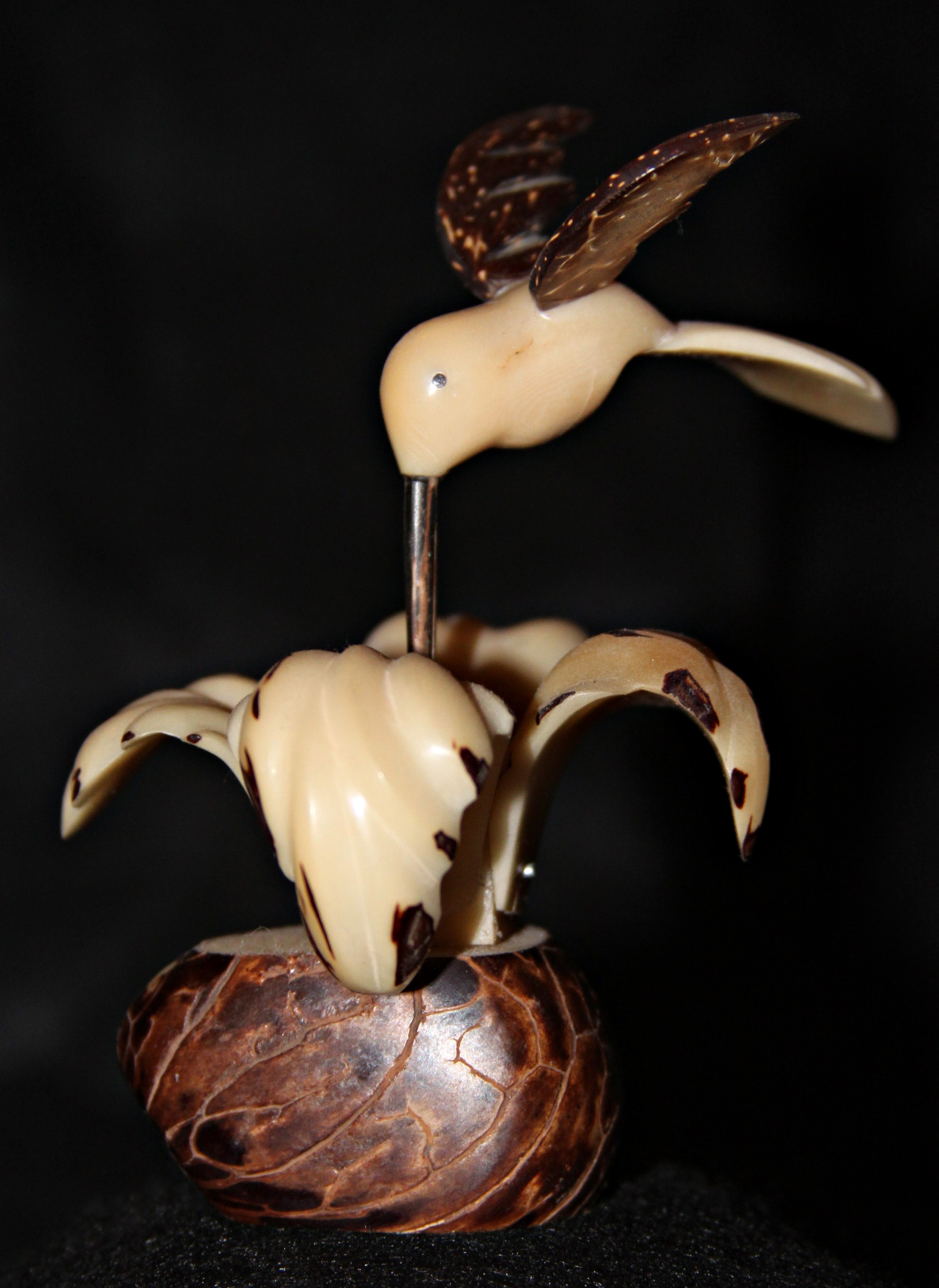
Tagua nut carving

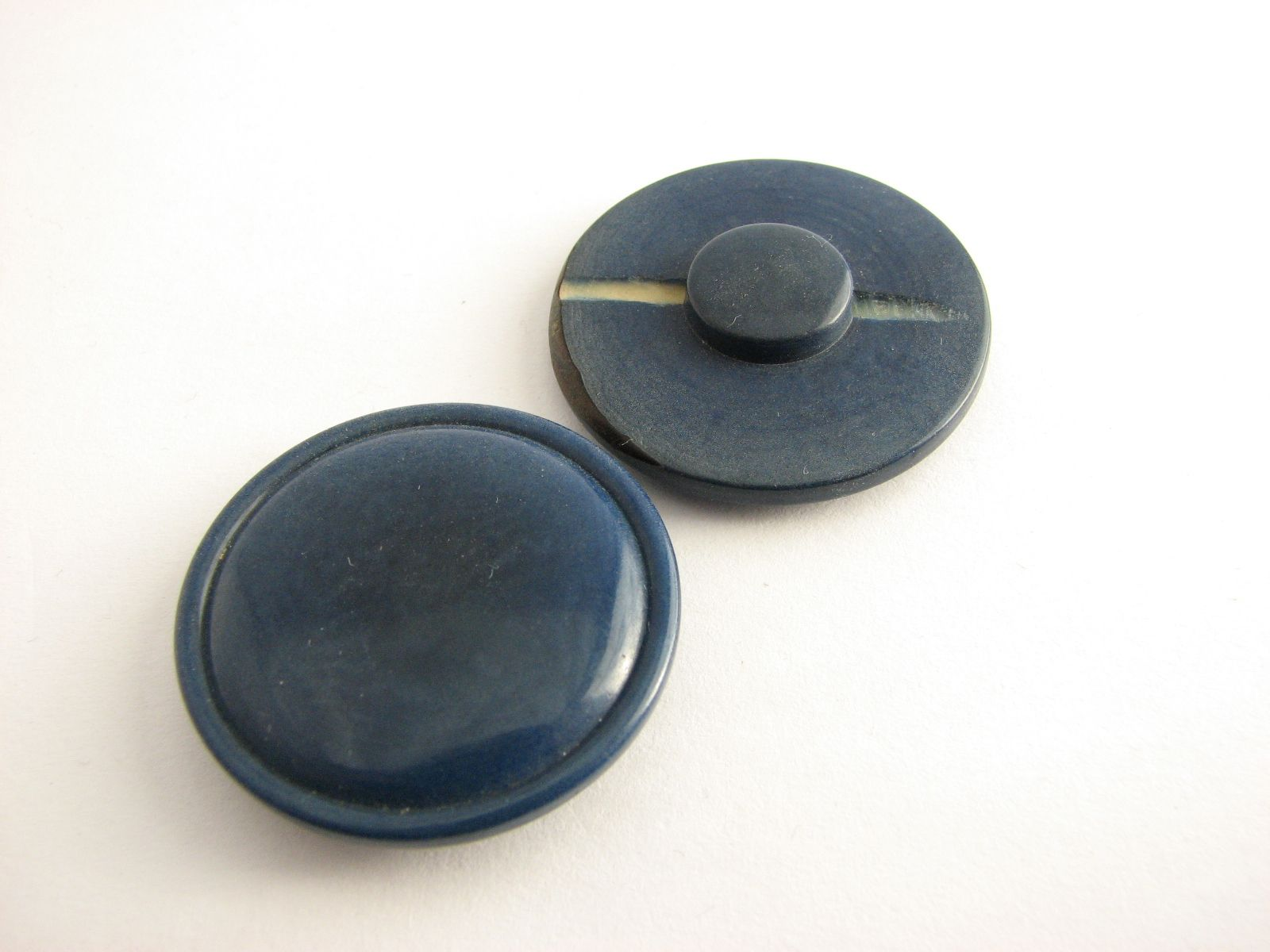
These tagua nut buttons reveal the grain on the top. The carved hole in the shank is the natural color.

Species in the genus Phytelephas (literally "elephant plant"), native to South America, are the most important sources of vegetable ivory. The seeds of the Caroline ivory-nut palm from the Caroline Islands, natangura palm from Solomon Islands and Vanuatu, and the real fan palm, from Sub-Saharan Africa, are also used to produce vegetable ivory.

A tagua palm can take up to 15 years to mature. But once it gets to this stage it can go on producing vegetable ivory for up to 100 years. In any given year a tagua palm can produce 15–20 kg of vegetable ivory.

== Species ==
Some species from which vegetable ivory is harvested are:

- Corypha utan (buri palm) — Asia and Oceania
- Corypha umbraculifera (talipot palm) — India and Sri Lanka
- Hyphaene coriacea (ilala palm) — south-eastern Africa
- Hyphaene petersiana (makalani palm) — Africa
- Hyphaene thebaica (doum palm) — Africa
- Leopoldinia piassaba (piassaba) — North and South America
- Mauritiella armata — South America
- Metroxylon amicarum (ivory nut palm) — Caroline Islands (western Pacific Ocean)
- Metroxylon warburgii (natangura palm) — Solomon Islands and Vanuatu
- Phytelephas aequatorialis — mainly in Ecuador
- Phytelephas macrocarpa — mainly in Peru and Bolivia
- Phytelephas seemannii — mainly in Colombia and Panama
- Phytelephas tenuicaulis — Amazon rainforest regions of Bolivia, Colombia, Ecuador, and Peru

== Uses ==
An early use of vegetable ivory, attested from the 1880s, was the manufacture of buttons. The material is called corozo or corosso when used in buttons. Rochester, New York was a center of manufacturing where the buttons were "subjected to a treatment which is secret among the Rochester manufacturers", presumably improving their "beauty and wearing qualities". Before plastic became common in button production, about 20% of all buttons produced in the US were made of vegetable ivory.

Vegetable ivory has been used extensively to make dice, knife handles, and chess pieces. It is a very hard and dense material. Similar to stone, it is too hard to carve with a knife but instead requires hacksaws and files.

Many vegetable ivory buttons were decorated in a way that used the natural tagua nut colour as a contrast to the dyed surface, because the dye did not penetrate deeper than the first layer. This also helps identify the material.

== See also ==
- Fruit pit carving – Chinese folk handicraft
