= Promecotheca octostriata =

Scientific classification
- Kingdom: Animalia
- Phylum: Arthropoda
- Clade: Pancrustacea
- Class: Insecta
- Order: Coleoptera
- Suborder: Polyphaga
- Infraorder: Cucujiformia
- Family: Chrysomelidae
- Genus: Promecotheca
- Species: P. octostriata

Binomial name
- Promecotheca octostriata Chapuis, 1876

Species of beetle

Promecotheca octostriata is a species of beetle of the family Chrysomelidae. It is found in the Philippines (Bohol, Mindanao).

No host plant has been documented for this species.
