= Promecotheca apicalis =

Scientific classification
- Kingdom: Animalia
- Phylum: Arthropoda
- Clade: Pancrustacea
- Class: Insecta
- Order: Coleoptera
- Suborder: Polyphaga
- Infraorder: Cucujiformia
- Family: Chrysomelidae
- Genus: Promecotheca
- Species: P. apicalis

Binomial name
- Promecotheca apicalis Weise, 1911

Species of beetle

Promecotheca apicalis is a species of beetle of the family Chrysomelidae. It is found in the Philippines (Ticao Island).

== Life history ==
No host plant has been documented for this species.
