= Promecotheca bryantiae =

Scientific classification
- Kingdom: Animalia
- Phylum: Arthropoda
- Clade: Pancrustacea
- Class: Insecta
- Order: Coleoptera
- Suborder: Polyphaga
- Infraorder: Cucujiformia
- Family: Chrysomelidae
- Genus: Promecotheca
- Species: P. bryantiae

Binomial name
- Promecotheca bryantiae Gressitt, 1960

Synonyms
- Promecotheca bryanti

Species of beetle

Promecotheca bryantiae is a species of beetle of the family Chrysomelidae. It is found on the Solomon Islands (Malaita).

== Description ==
Adults reach a length of about 8.2 mm. They are reddish to metallic purplish, with a mostly pale head. The elytra are metallic purplish, but pale on the base and along the basal portion of the suture.

== Life history ==
The recorded host plants for this species are Pandanus (subgenus Bryantia) species. The larvae mine in the sides of the leaves of their host plant, with each mine containing four or more larvae.
