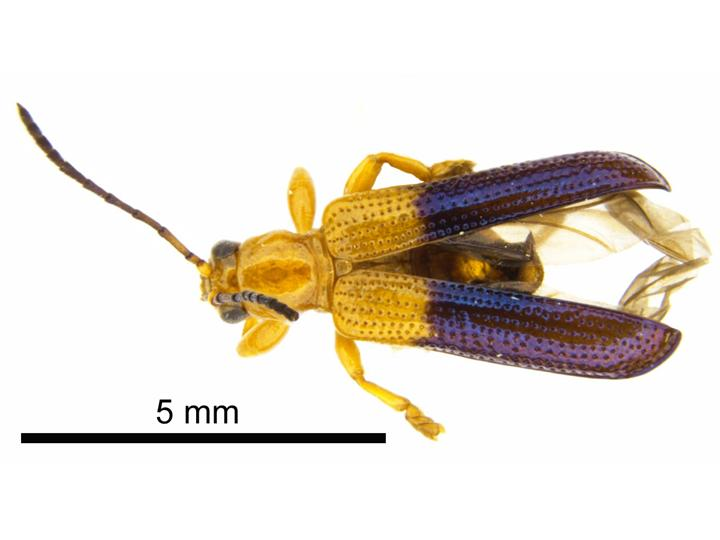

Scientific classification
- Kingdom: Animalia
- Phylum: Arthropoda
- Clade: Pancrustacea
- Class: Insecta
- Order: Coleoptera
- Suborder: Polyphaga
- Infraorder: Cucujiformia
- Family: Chrysomelidae
- Genus: Promecotheca
- Species: P. caeruleipennis

Binomial name
- Promecotheca caeruleipennis Blanchard, 1853

Synonyms
- Promecotheca reichei Baly, 1869; Promecotheca lindingeri Aulmann, 1914

= Promecotheca caeruleipennis =

Species of beetle

Promecotheca caeruleipennis is a species of beetle of the family Chrysomelidae. It is found in Fiji, the Philippines, Samoa, the Solomon Islands and Tonga.

== Description ==
Adults reach a length of about 7–8 mm. They are testaceous, with the posterior two-thirds of the elytra metallic blue-green.

== Life history ==
The recorded host plants for this species are Cocos nucifera, Pritchardia pacifica and Livistona species.
