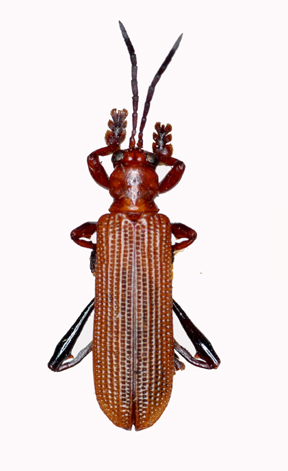
- Promecotheca cumingii

Scientific classification
- Kingdom: Animalia
- Phylum: Arthropoda
- Class: Insecta
- Order: Coleoptera
- Suborder: Polyphaga
- Infraorder: Cucujiformia
- Family: Chrysomelidae
- Subfamily: Cassidinae
- Tribe: Promecothecini; Chapuis, 1875

Synonyms
- Promecothecites Chapuis, 1875; Promecothecini: Weise, 1911

= Promecothecini =

Tribe of leaf beetles

Promecothecini is a tribe of old-world leaf beetles within the subfamily Cassidinae.

== Genera ==
BioLib includes:

1. Promecispa: monotypic Promecispa voeltzkowi Weise, 1909 - Madagascar
2. Promecotheca Blanchard, 1853 - Asia widespread
