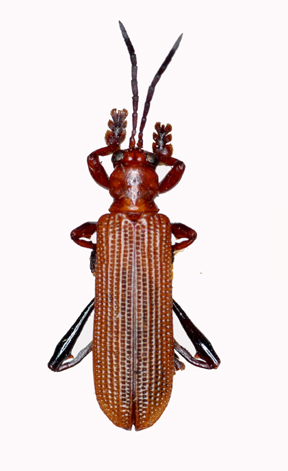

Scientific classification
- Kingdom: Animalia
- Phylum: Arthropoda
- Clade: Pancrustacea
- Class: Insecta
- Order: Coleoptera
- Suborder: Polyphaga
- Infraorder: Cucujiformia
- Family: Chrysomelidae
- Genus: Promecotheca
- Species: P. cumingii

Binomial name
- Promecotheca cumingii Baly, 1858

Synonyms
- Promecotheca trilbyi Thomson, 1856

= Promecotheca cumingii =

Species of beetle

Promecotheca cumingii is a species of beetle of the family Chrysomelidae. It is found in China, Indonesia (Borneo, Sulawesi, Java), Malaysia, the Philippines (Leyte, Luzon, Mindanao, Palawan, Samar), Singapore and Sri Lanka.

== Life history ==
The recorded host plants for this species are Cocos nucifera, Nypa fruticans, Metroxylon and Caryola species, as well as Oreodoxa regia.
