= Promecotheca petelii =

Scientific classification
- Kingdom: Animalia
- Phylum: Arthropoda
- Clade: Pancrustacea
- Class: Insecta
- Order: Coleoptera
- Suborder: Polyphaga
- Infraorder: Cucujiformia
- Family: Chrysomelidae
- Genus: Promecotheca
- Species: P. petelii

Binomial name
- Promecotheca petelii Guérin-Méneville, 1840

Species of beetle

Promecotheca petelii is a species of beetle of the family Chrysomelidae. It is found in Indonesia (Java).

No host plant has been documented for this species.
