= Promecotheca alpiniae =

Scientific classification
- Kingdom: Animalia
- Phylum: Arthropoda
- Clade: Pancrustacea
- Class: Insecta
- Order: Coleoptera
- Suborder: Polyphaga
- Infraorder: Cucujiformia
- Family: Chrysomelidae
- Genus: Promecotheca
- Species: P. alpiniae

Binomial name
- Promecotheca alpiniae Maulik, 1929

Synonyms
- Promecotheca alpiniae robusta Gressitt, 1957

Species of beetle

Promecotheca alpiniae is a species of beetle of the family Chrysomelidae. It is found on the Solomon Islands (Guadalcanal).

== Description ==
The larvae are very pale, with the anterior end of the head pigmented.

== Life history ==
The recorded host plants for this species are Alpinia and Heliconia species.
