= Promecotheca guadala =

Scientific classification
- Kingdom: Animalia
- Phylum: Arthropoda
- Clade: Pancrustacea
- Class: Insecta
- Order: Coleoptera
- Suborder: Polyphaga
- Infraorder: Cucujiformia
- Family: Chrysomelidae
- Genus: Promecotheca
- Species: P. guadala

Binomial name
- Promecotheca guadala Maulik, 1932

Species of beetle

Promecotheca guadala is a species of beetle of the family Chrysomelidae. It is found on the Solomon Islands (Guadalcanal).

== Life history ==
The recorded host plants for this species are Ptychosperma and Balaka species.
