= Phytelephas schottii =

Scientific classification
- Kingdom: Plantae
- Clade: Tracheophytes
- Clade: Angiosperms
- Clade: Monocots
- Clade: Commelinids
- Order: Arecales
- Family: Arecaceae
- Genus: Phytelephas
- Species: P. schottii

Binomial name
- Phytelephas schottii H.Wendl.

Species of palm

Phytelephas schottii, the corozo palm, is a palm tree native to Colombia which bears a fruit which in Colombia is called corozo. The corozo fruit is often made into a sweet beverage called jugo de corozo.
