= Promecotheca soror =

Scientific classification
- Kingdom: Animalia
- Phylum: Arthropoda
- Clade: Pancrustacea
- Class: Insecta
- Order: Coleoptera
- Suborder: Polyphaga
- Infraorder: Cucujiformia
- Family: Chrysomelidae
- Genus: Promecotheca
- Species: P. soror

Binomial name
- Promecotheca soror Maulik, 1929

Species of beetle

Promecotheca soror is a species of beetle of the family Chrysomelidae. It is found in Indonesia (Sulawesi, the Moluccas).

== Life history ==
The recorded host plant for this species is Cocos nucifera.
