= Promecotheca superba =

Scientific classification
- Kingdom: Animalia
- Phylum: Arthropoda
- Clade: Pancrustacea
- Class: Insecta
- Order: Coleoptera
- Suborder: Polyphaga
- Infraorder: Cucujiformia
- Family: Chrysomelidae
- Genus: Promecotheca
- Species: P. superba

Binomial name
- Promecotheca superba Pic, 1924

Species of beetle

Promecotheca superba is a species of beetle of the family Chrysomelidae. It is found on the Solomon Islands (Bougainville).

== Life history ==
No host plant has been documented for this species.
