= Promecotheca violacea =

Scientific classification
- Kingdom: Animalia
- Phylum: Arthropoda
- Clade: Pancrustacea
- Class: Insecta
- Order: Coleoptera
- Suborder: Polyphaga
- Infraorder: Cucujiformia
- Family: Chrysomelidae
- Genus: Promecotheca
- Species: P. violacea

Binomial name
- Promecotheca violacea Uhmann, 1932

Species of beetle

Promecotheca violacea is a species of beetle of the family Chrysomelidae. It is found on the Solomon Islands (Bougainville, New Georgia, Ysabel).

== Life history ==
The recorded host plants for this species are Pandanus species (including Pandanus dubius) and Ptychosperma species.
