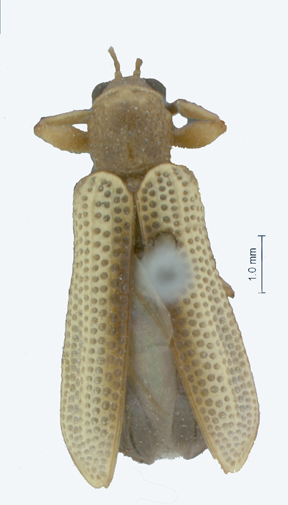

Scientific classification
- Kingdom: Animalia
- Phylum: Arthropoda
- Clade: Pancrustacea
- Class: Insecta
- Order: Coleoptera
- Suborder: Polyphaga
- Infraorder: Cucujiformia
- Family: Chrysomelidae
- Subfamily: Cassidinae
- Tribe: Promecothecini
- Genus: Promecispa; Weise, 1909
- Species: P. voeltzkowi

Binomial name
- Promecispa voeltzkowi Weise, 1909

= Promecispa =

Genus of beetles

Promecispa is a genus of leaf beetles in the family Chrysomelidae. It is monotypic, being represented by the single species, Promecispa voeltzkowi, which is found in Madagascar.

== Life history ==
No host plant has been documented for this species.
