= Phytelephas olsonii =

Scientific classification
- Kingdom: Plantae
- Clade: Tracheophytes
- Clade: Angiosperms
- Clade: Monocots
- Clade: Commelinids
- Order: Arecales
- Family: Arecaceae
- Genus: Phytelephas
- Species: †P. olsonii

Binomial name
- †Phytelephas olsonii R.W.Br.

Species of fossil palm

Phytelephas olsonii is a species of fossil palm in the genus Phytelephas.
