= Mauritiella pumila =

Scientific classification
- Kingdom: Plantae
- Clade: Tracheophytes
- Clade: Angiosperms
- Clade: Monocots
- Clade: Commelinids
- Order: Arecales
- Family: Arecaceae
- Genus: Mauritiella
- Species: M. pumila

Binomial name
- Mauritiella pumila (Mart.) Burret

Species of palm

Mauritiella pumila is a species of flowering plant in the family Arecaceae. It is found in Colombia and Venezuela.
