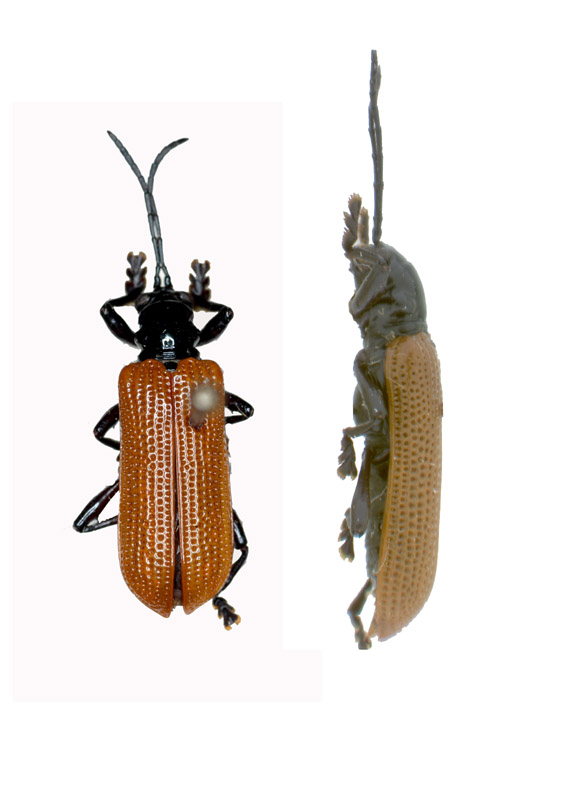

Scientific classification
- Kingdom: Animalia
- Phylum: Arthropoda
- Clade: Pancrustacea
- Class: Insecta
- Order: Coleoptera
- Suborder: Polyphaga
- Infraorder: Cucujiformia
- Family: Chrysomelidae
- Genus: Promecotheca
- Species: P. callosa

Binomial name
- Promecotheca callosa Baly, 1876

= Promecotheca callosa =

Species of beetle

Promecotheca callosa is a species of beetle of the family Chrysomelidae. It is found in Australia (Queensland, Northern Territories) and south-western, south-eastern and north-eastern New Guinea.

== Description ==
Adults of subspecies major reach a length of about 10.9-12.2 mm, while the adults of subspecies callosa are smaller. Adults are shiny black with bright reddish orange elytra.

The larvae have also been described. They reach a length of about 15 mm.

== Life history ==
The recorded host plants for this species are palms (including Cocos nucifera), as well as Pandanus species.

== Subspecies ==
- Promecotheca callosa callosa (Australia, south-western and south-eastern New Guinea)
- Promecotheca callosa major Gressitt, 1963 (north-eastern New Guinea)
