= Promecotheca straminipennis =

Scientific classification
- Kingdom: Animalia
- Phylum: Arthropoda
- Clade: Pancrustacea
- Class: Insecta
- Order: Coleoptera
- Suborder: Polyphaga
- Infraorder: Cucujiformia
- Family: Chrysomelidae
- Genus: Promecotheca
- Species: P. straminipennis

Binomial name
- Promecotheca straminipennis Weise, 1922

Species of beetle

Promecotheca straminipennis is a species of beetle of the family Chrysomelidae. It is found on the Solomon Islands (New Britain).

== Life history ==
The recorded host plants for this species are Pandanus species (including Pandanus tectorius).
