= Promecotheca palmella =

Scientific classification
- Kingdom: Animalia
- Phylum: Arthropoda
- Clade: Pancrustacea
- Class: Insecta
- Order: Coleoptera
- Suborder: Polyphaga
- Infraorder: Cucujiformia
- Family: Chrysomelidae
- Genus: Promecotheca
- Species: P. palmella

Binomial name
- Promecotheca palmella Gressitt, 1960

Species of beetle

Promecotheca palmella is a species of beetle of the family Chrysomelidae. It is found on the Solomon Islands (New Georgia).

== Description ==
Adults reach a length of about 4.4 mm. They are bright red to shiny black. The head is pitchy black, while the prothorax is shiny black with a red base. The scutellum and elytra are red.

== Life history ==
The recorded host plant for this species is an unidentified small pinnate palm (Arecaceae).
