= Promecotheca leveri =

Scientific classification
- Kingdom: Animalia
- Phylum: Arthropoda
- Clade: Pancrustacea
- Class: Insecta
- Order: Coleoptera
- Suborder: Polyphaga
- Infraorder: Cucujiformia
- Family: Chrysomelidae
- Genus: Promecotheca
- Species: P. leveri

Binomial name
- Promecotheca leveri Spaeth, 1937

Synonyms
- Promecotheca leveri bougainvilleana Gressitt, 1957

Species of beetle

Promecotheca leveri is a species of beetle of the family Chrysomelidae. It is found on the Solomon Islands (Bougainville, Ysabel).

== Life history ==
The recorded host plants for this species are Areca, Calamus and possibly Balaka species.
