= Promecotheca collinsi =

Scientific classification
- Kingdom: Animalia
- Phylum: Arthropoda
- Clade: Pancrustacea
- Class: Insecta
- Order: Coleoptera
- Suborder: Polyphaga
- Infraorder: Cucujiformia
- Family: Chrysomelidae
- Genus: Promecotheca
- Species: P. collinsi

Binomial name
- Promecotheca collinsi (Gressitt, 1960)

Synonyms
- Freycinetispa collinsi Gressitt, 1960

Species of beetle

Promecotheca collinsi is a species of beetle of the family Chrysomelidae. It is found on the Solomon Islands (Kolombangara).

== Description ==
Adults reach a length of about 3.4 mm. They are pale reddish brown, but slightly paler on the abdomen and legs and the antennae are mostly blackish. The larvae have also been described. They are very pale.

== Life history ==
The recorded host plants for this species are Freycinetia species.
