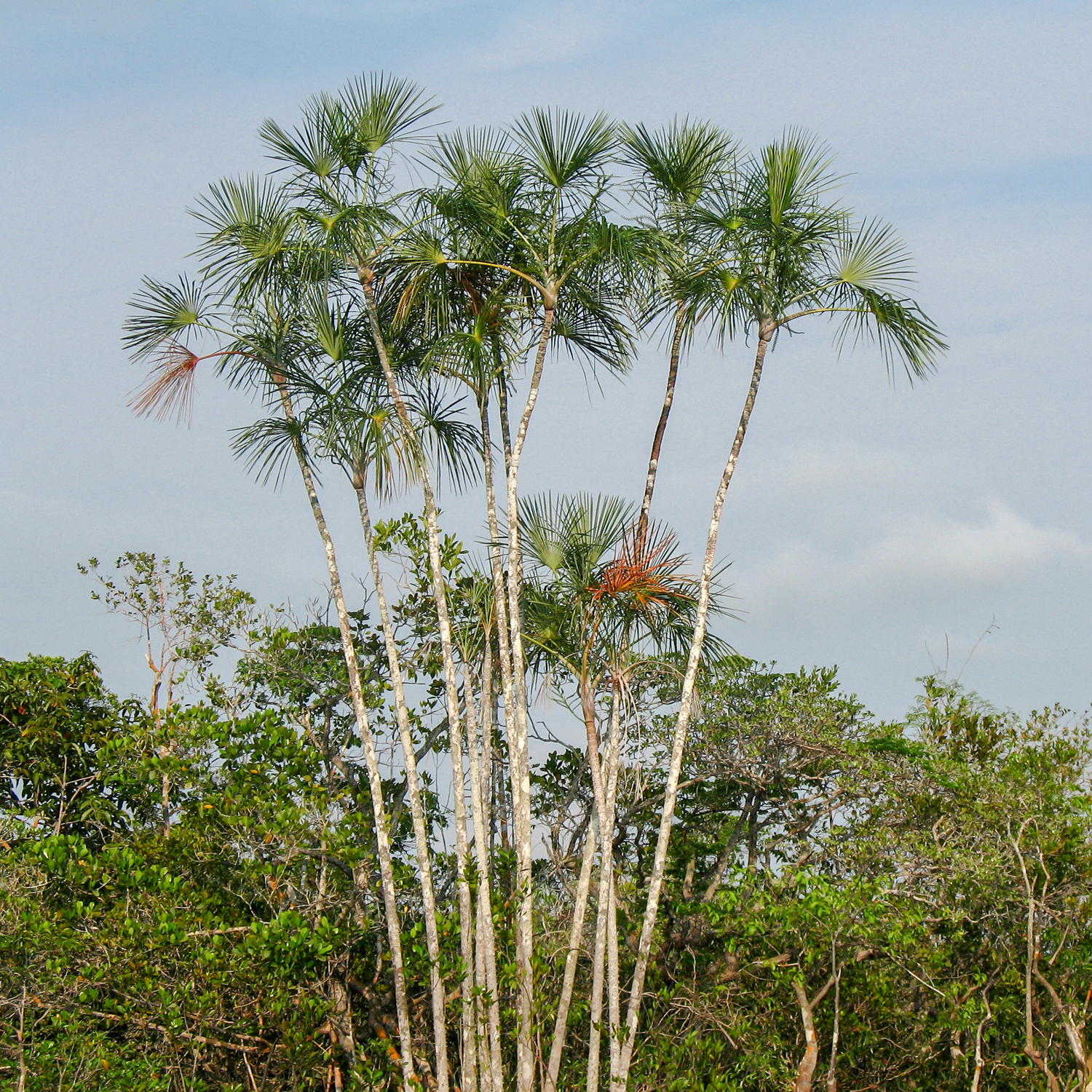
- Mauritiella aculeata at Barcelos, Amazonas, Brazil

Scientific classification
- Kingdom: Plantae
- Clade: Tracheophytes
- Clade: Angiosperms
- Clade: Monocots
- Clade: Commelinids
- Order: Arecales
- Family: Arecaceae
- Genus: Mauritiella
- Species: M. aculeata

Binomial name
- Mauritiella aculeata (Kunth) Burret

= Mauritiella aculeata =

Species of palm

Mauritiella aculeata is a species of flowering plant in the family Arecaceae. It is found in northern South America, in northern Brazil, Colombia, and Venezuela.
