= Promecotheca varipes =

Scientific classification
- Kingdom: Animalia
- Phylum: Arthropoda
- Clade: Pancrustacea
- Class: Insecta
- Order: Coleoptera
- Suborder: Polyphaga
- Infraorder: Cucujiformia
- Family: Chrysomelidae
- Genus: Promecotheca
- Species: P. varipes

Binomial name
- Promecotheca varipes Baly, 1858

Species of beetle

Promecotheca varipes is a species of beetle of the family Chrysomelidae. It is found in Australia (Northern Territory) and New Guinea.

== Life history ==
The recorded host plants for this species are Pandanus species and Cocos nucifera.
