= Promecotheca similis =

Scientific classification
- Kingdom: Animalia
- Phylum: Arthropoda
- Clade: Pancrustacea
- Class: Insecta
- Order: Coleoptera
- Suborder: Polyphaga
- Infraorder: Cucujiformia
- Family: Chrysomelidae
- Genus: Promecotheca
- Species: P. similis

Binomial name
- Promecotheca similis Uhmann, 1933

Species of beetle

Promecotheca similis is a species of beetle of the family Chrysomelidae. It is found in the Philippines (Luzon).

== Life history ==
The recorded host plant for this species is Cocos nucifera.
