= Promecotheca papuana =

Scientific classification
- Kingdom: Animalia
- Phylum: Arthropoda
- Clade: Pancrustacea
- Class: Insecta
- Order: Coleoptera
- Suborder: Polyphaga
- Infraorder: Cucujiformia
- Family: Chrysomelidae
- Genus: Promecotheca
- Species: P. papuana

Binomial name
- Promecotheca papuana Csiki, 1900

Synonyms
- Promecotheca biroi Csiki, 1900; Promecotheca antiqua Weise, 1905

Species of beetle

Promecotheca papuana is a species of beetle of the family Chrysomelidae. It is found on the Solomon Islands (Bougainville, New Britain) and in New Guinea.

The recorded host plants for this species is Cocos nucifera, Areca cathecu, Nipa fruticans, Metroxylon sagu and Elaeis guineensis.
