= Promecotheca freycinetiae =

Scientific classification
- Kingdom: Animalia
- Phylum: Arthropoda
- Clade: Pancrustacea
- Class: Insecta
- Order: Coleoptera
- Suborder: Polyphaga
- Infraorder: Cucujiformia
- Family: Chrysomelidae
- Genus: Promecotheca
- Species: P. freycinetiae

Binomial name
- Promecotheca freycinetiae Gressitt, 1960

Species of beetle

Promecotheca freycinetiae is a species of beetle of the family Chrysomelidae. It is found on Biak.

== Description ==
Adults reach a length of about 8.9-10.6 mm. They are reddish to steely blue. The head is reddish pitchy, while the antennae are bluish black and the prothorax is pitchy black. The scutellum is black and the elytra are pale on the basal one-third, while the rest is bluish black.

The larvae are very pale, with the anterior portion of the head and apex of the caudal process darkened.

== Life history ==
The recorded host plants for this species are Freycinetia species.
