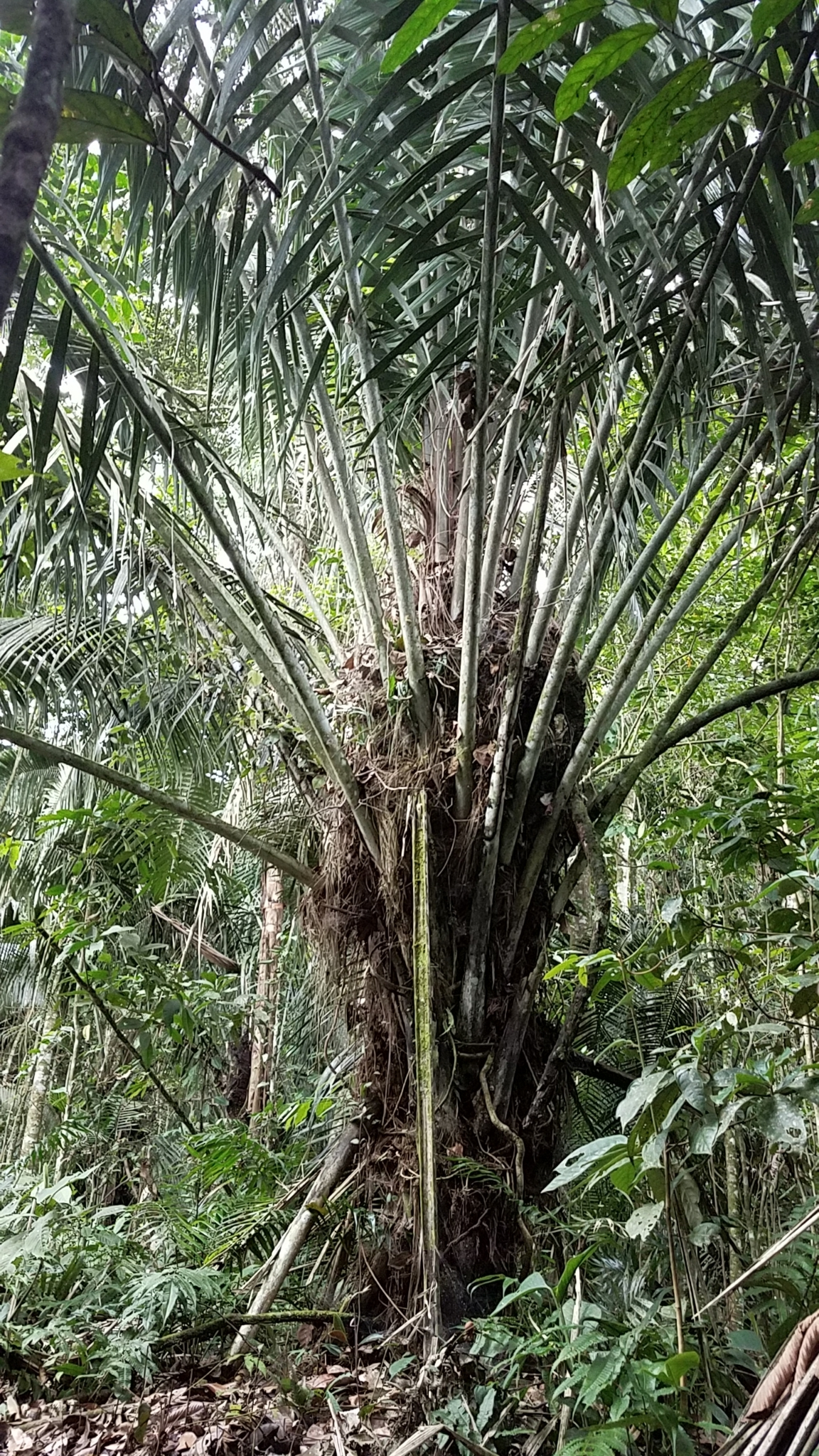

Scientific classification
- Kingdom: Plantae
- Clade: Tracheophytes
- Clade: Angiosperms
- Clade: Monocots
- Clade: Commelinids
- Order: Arecales
- Family: Arecaceae
- Subfamily: Ceroxyloideae
- Tribe: Phytelepheae
- Genus: Aphandra; Barfod
- Species: A. natalia

Binomial name
- Aphandra natalia (Balslev & A. J. Hend.) Barfod

= Aphandra =

Genus of palms

Aphandra is a monotypic genus of flowering plants in the palm family native to the Amazon rainforest vegetation in South America (Ecuador, Brazil, and Peru). Its only species is Aphandra natalia, sometimes called mastodon palm or fiber palm, and is used by indigenous peoples in the construction of brooms and other products. This plant is commercially exploited for its edible fruits, and for its leaf sheath and petiole fibers. This fiber is almost equal to the fiber extracted from Attalea funifera and Leopoldinia piassaba, which is called piassava.

The genus name is a combination of Ammandra and Phytelephas, two closely related palm genera, and the epithet "natalia" honors Natalie Uhl, modern palm taxonomist.

== Description ==
Aphandra natalia grows from single trunks, reaching over 12 m in height, being gray to tan in color. These trees usually remain covered in the bases of old leaves giving them a seeming trunk diameter of nearly 1 meter, however the actual trunk size when cleaned of the leaf bases is nearer to 30 cm. The vine-like, pendent fibers of the leaf bases resemble those of Leopoldinia piassaba from which brooms are also made. The actual leaves of A. natalia are usually 4.5 m in length but are borne on long, 2.5 m petioles giving them an overall length of 7 m. The leaflets are reduplicate, pinnately cleft and dark green in color.

They are sexually dioecious and markedly dimorphic; male plants produce an unusual 2.75 m inflorescence with many clustered branches of yellow flowers with females producing shorter tufts of yellow flowers surrounded by green to brown bracts. A mature infructescence resembles "a medieval club with spikes if the large amount of hairy black fiber was removed".

== Distribution and habitat ==
A. natalia grows in eastern Ecuador through northern Peru to western Brazil reaching altitudes of 800 m. They are an under-story palm in the Amazon rainforest stretching to the foothills of the Andes.
