= Promecotheca bicolor =

Scientific classification
- Kingdom: Animalia
- Phylum: Arthropoda
- Clade: Pancrustacea
- Class: Insecta
- Order: Coleoptera
- Suborder: Polyphaga
- Infraorder: Cucujiformia
- Family: Chrysomelidae
- Genus: Promecotheca
- Species: P. bicolor

Binomial name
- Promecotheca bicolor Maulik, 1927

Species of beetle

Promecotheca bicolor is a species of beetle of the family Chrysomelidae. It is found in Fiji.

== Description ==
Adults reach a length of about 7-8.5 mm. They are reddish testaceous with bluish antennae. The posterior two-thirds of the elytra are blue-green.

== Life history ==
The recorded host plants for this species are Flagellaria species.
