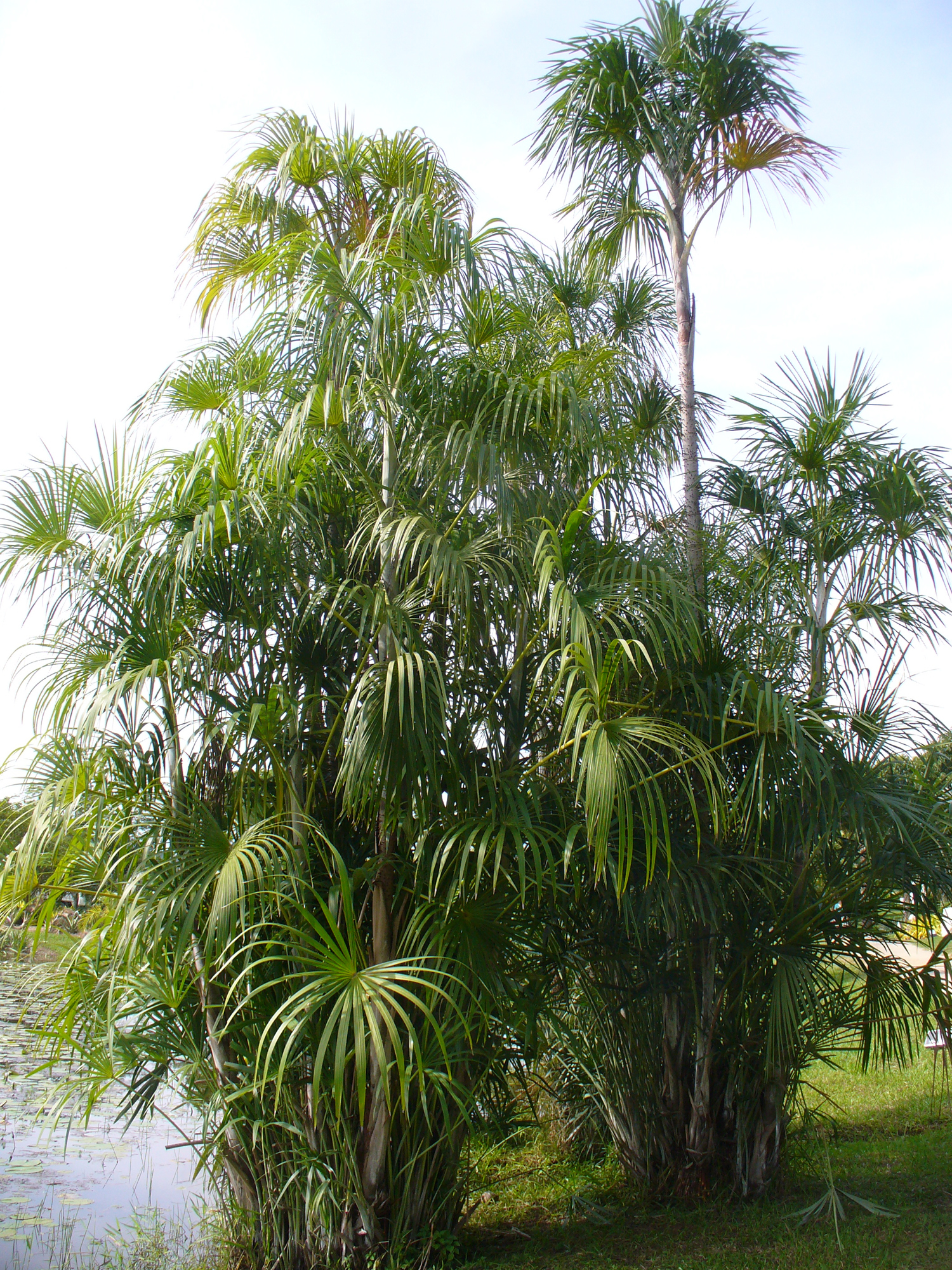
- Mauritiella armata

Scientific classification
- Kingdom: Plantae
- Clade: Tracheophytes
- Clade: Angiosperms
- Clade: Monocots
- Clade: Commelinids
- Order: Arecales
- Family: Arecaceae
- Subfamily: Calamoideae
- Tribe: Lepidocaryeae
- Genus: Mauritiella; Burret

Synonyms
- Lepidococcus H.Wendl. & Drude

= Mauritiella =

Genus of palms

Mauritiella is a dioecious genus of flowering plant in the palm family found in South America where it is commonly called buriti. It is named after the similar and closely related genus Mauritia.

Four species are recognized:

- Mauritiella aculeata (Kunth) Burret - Venezuela, southeastern Colombia, northwestern Brazil
- Mauritiella armata (Mart.) Burret - Brazil, Bolivia, Peru, Ecuador, Colombia, Venezuela, Guyana, Suriname
- Mauritiella macroclada (Burret) Burret - western Ecuador, western Colombia
- Mauritiella pumila (Wallace) Burret - southwestern Venezuela, southeastern Colombia

== Description ==
From 7.5 to 18 m tall, the trunks are clustering and armed with small spines, usually with stilt roots at the base. A. aculeata tends to be smaller, with trunk diameters around 10 cm, M. armata and M. macroclada trunks reach 25 – 30 cm; all three retain persistent leaf bases towards the top of the stem. Each 1 m leaf of a mature tree is palmate with a brief costa, borne on a long petiole, and divided into numerous, deep segments; leaves of juvenile trees are flattened and much less divided. Bright to deep green, the foliage has silvery, glaucous undersides.

The inflorescence is usually solitary, interfoliar, with male and female units represented in separate plants. The round fruit is usually one-seeded and covered in red to brown scales with a thick, fleshy mesocarp. The seed is spherical or oblong, basally attached, with an elongated apical knob.

== Distribution and habitat ==
Mauritiella palms are found throughout South America's northern half on mountains, alongside rivers and watercourses, in rain forest and in cleared or open savanna. M. aculeata grows on the banks of the Orinoco and its tributaries in Venezuela, Colombia, and Brazil, M. macroclada inhabits the western slopes of the Andes in Colombia and Ecuador to an elevation of 900 m, with M. armata (locally known as aguajillo) being the most widespread, found throughout Amazonia and adjacent uplands, alongside streams and rivers. Usually found at low elevations, M. armata also thrives in mountainous Guyana to elevations of 1400 m. In habitat, the leaves are used in roof construction and the fruit is eaten.
