= Promecotheca palmivora =

Scientific classification
- Kingdom: Animalia
- Phylum: Arthropoda
- Clade: Pancrustacea
- Class: Insecta
- Order: Coleoptera
- Suborder: Polyphaga
- Infraorder: Cucujiformia
- Family: Chrysomelidae
- Genus: Promecotheca
- Species: P. palmivora

Binomial name
- Promecotheca palmivora Gressitt, 1960

Species of beetle

Promecotheca palmivora is a species of beetle of the family Chrysomelidae. It is found in northern New Guinea.

== Description ==
Adults reach a length of about 9.7 mm. They are orange to pitchy black. The antennae are orange and the prothorax is pitchy black. The scutellum is black and the elytra are reddish orange, but pitchy brown on the apical one-fifth and paler on the external margin.

== Life history ==
The recorded host plant for this species is an unidentified palm with thick leaves.
