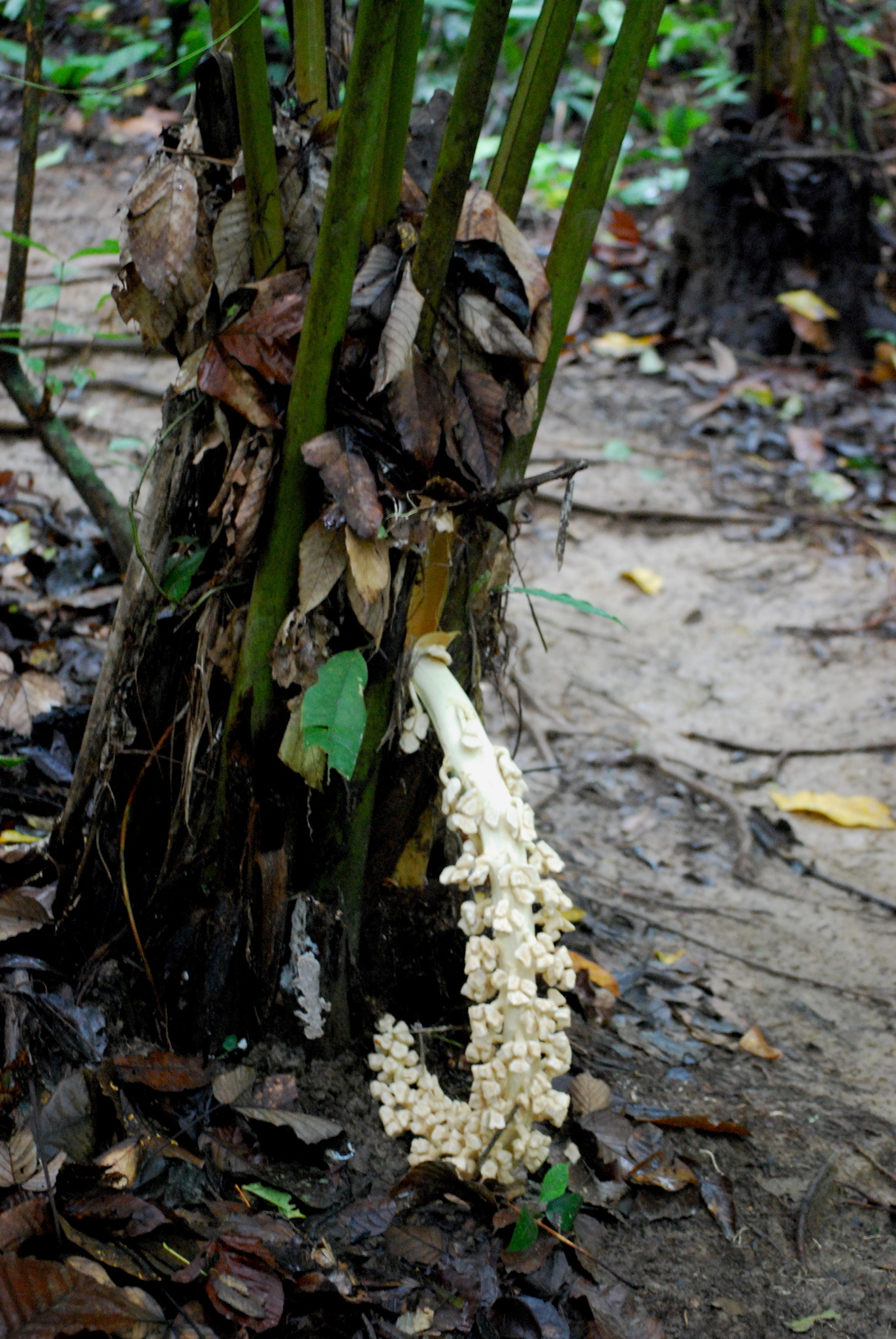

Scientific classification
- Kingdom: Plantae
- Clade: Tracheophytes
- Clade: Angiosperms
- Clade: Monocots
- Clade: Commelinids
- Order: Arecales
- Family: Arecaceae
- Subfamily: Ceroxyloideae
- Tribe: Phytelepheae
- Genus: Ammandra; O.F.Cook
- Species: A. decasperma

Binomial name
- Ammandra decasperma O.F.Cook

Synonyms
- Phytelephas decasperma (O.F.Cook) Dahlgren; Phytelephas dasyneura Burret; Ammandra dasyneura (Burret) Barfod

= Ammandra =

Genus of palms

Ammandra is a monotypic genus of flowering plants in the palm family found in Colombia and Ecuador, where it is endangered. The sole species is Ammandra decasperma, although another species name has been proposed. It is a pinnate-leaved, dioecious palm whose seeds and petioles are used in button and basket making, respectively. It is commonly called ivory palm or cabecita.

== Description ==
Ammandra decasperma grows in multi-headed clusters, the trunks usually remaining underground or prostrate upon it. Despite the negligible trunk size, the leaves reach over 6 m long, slightly arching, on 2 m petioles. The linear leaflets are dark green, 60–90 cm long, and emerge from the rachis in the same plane. In male plants, the inflorescence is a long spike covered in short branches of white to yellow flowers, the female's being much shorter and more compact. The round fruit grows in clusters of 3-6 and is covered in pointed warts, each fruit containing six or more kidney shaped seeds.

== Taxonomy ==
The type species described by Cook was Ammandra decasperma; a similar population was found being geographically separated and with minor flower differences and was designated A. dasyneura (Burret). In 2001, Bernal et al. published the discovery of an Ammandra population located between the other two with floral characteristics represented in both groups. They, and other taxonomists since, concluded that the three populations were of a single species (see distribution map).

Separately, the only species in the closely related genus Aphandra, Aphandra natalia, was initially described as Ammandra natalia but was later given its own genus.

The genus name translates from Greek to "sand man", because "The stamens are minute and have the appearance of small grains of sand scattered over the surface of the receptacles", and the species epithet derives from two Latin words meaning "ten" and "seed", describing the maximum number of seeds per fruit.

== Distribution and habitat ==
These palms grow in the foothills of the Andes mountains, along Colombia's west coast as well as inland Ecuador up to 450 m in elevation. In either case, they are an understory plant usually receiving only filtered light and nearly year-round rainfall.

== Cultivation and uses ==
Ammandra is not common in cultivation outside its natural range but when grown, it requires wet and warm conditions resembling the rain forest and will not tolerate full sun when young. It also prefers free-draining, highly organic soil. In Colombia, their large, strong petioles are commonly woven into baskets and other thatched goods, while the large white seeds, commonly called "vegetable ivory", are carved into buttons and trinkets.
