= Promecotheca cyanipes =

Scientific classification
- Kingdom: Animalia
- Phylum: Arthropoda
- Clade: Pancrustacea
- Class: Insecta
- Order: Coleoptera
- Suborder: Polyphaga
- Infraorder: Cucujiformia
- Family: Chrysomelidae
- Genus: Promecotheca
- Species: P. cyanipes

Binomial name
- Promecotheca cyanipes (Erichson, 1834)

Synonyms
- Hispa cyanipes Erichson, 1834; Hispa (Strophosoma) flava Desmarest, 1841; Promecotheca scorpio Thomson, 1856

Species of beetle

Promecotheca cyanipes is a species of beetle of the family Chrysomelidae. It is found in China and the Philippines (Bucas, Luzon, Mindanao, Panaon, Panay, Polillo, Tawi).

== Life history ==
The recorded host plants for this species are Cocos species.
