= Promecotheca pandani =

Scientific classification
- Kingdom: Animalia
- Phylum: Arthropoda
- Clade: Pancrustacea
- Class: Insecta
- Order: Coleoptera
- Suborder: Polyphaga
- Infraorder: Cucujiformia
- Family: Chrysomelidae
- Genus: Promecotheca
- Species: P. pandani

Binomial name
- Promecotheca pandani Gressitt, 1960

Species of beetle

Promecotheca pandani is a species of beetle of the family Chrysomelidae. It is found in north-western and north-eastern New Guinea.

== Description ==
Adults reach a length of about 11.8 mm. They are orange to shiny bluish black. The head is mostly blackish, while the antennae are pale and the prothorax is black (but slightly tinged with blue and slightly pitchy reddish apically). The scutellum is black and the elytra are pale on the basal five-sixths and bluish black apically.

The larvae reach a length of about 12 mm.

== Life history ==
The recorded host plants for this species are Pandanus species.
