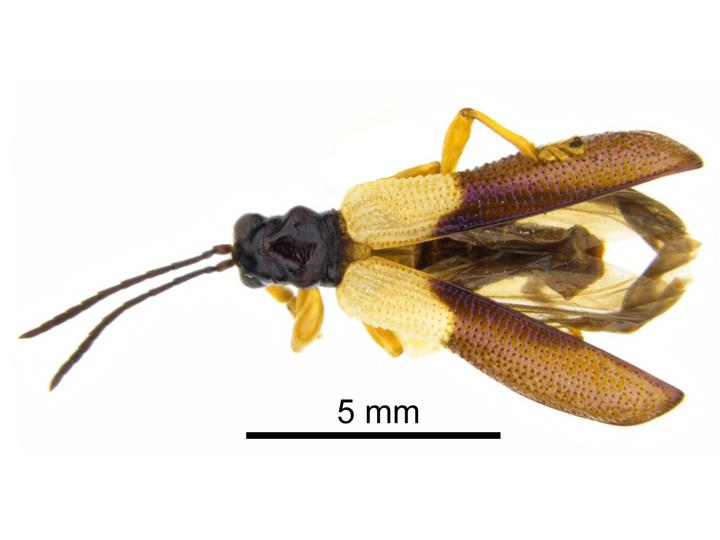
- Promecotheca opacicollis

Scientific classification
- Kingdom: Animalia
- Phylum: Arthropoda
- Clade: Pancrustacea
- Class: Insecta
- Order: Coleoptera
- Suborder: Polyphaga
- Infraorder: Cucujiformia
- Family: Chrysomelidae
- Subfamily: Cassidinae
- Tribe: Promecothecini
- Genus: Promecotheca; Blanchard, 1853

Synonyms
- Freycinetispa Gressitt, 1960

= Promecotheca =

Genus of beetles

Promecotheca is a genus of Asian leaf beetles, typical of the tribe Promecothecini in the subfamily Cassidinae; it was erected by Émile Blanchard in 1853.

Species are especially well represented in New Guinea and the Pacific islands; some are minor coconut pests including: Promecotheca cumingii, P. papuana ("coconut leaf miners") and P. opacicollis: the New Hebrides coconut hispid.

== Species ==
The Global Biodiversity Information Facility includes:

1. Promecotheca alpiniae Maulik, 1929
2. Promecotheca apicalis Weise, 1911
3. Promecotheca bicolor Maulik, 1927
4. Promecotheca bryantiae Gressitt, 1960
5. Promecotheca caeruleipennis Blanchard, 1853
6. Promecotheca callosa Baly, 1876
7. Promecotheca collinsi (Gressitt, 1960)
8. Promecotheca cumingii Baly, 1858
9. Promecotheca cyanipes (Erichson, 1834)
10. Promecotheca freycinetiae Gressitt, 1960
11. Promecotheca guadala Maulik, 1932
12. Promecotheca kolombangara Gressitt, 1957
13. Promecotheca leveri Spaeth, 1937
14. Promecotheca nuciferae Maulik, 1929
15. Promecotheca octostriata Chapuis, 1876
16. Promecotheca oenoptera Uhmann, 1931
17. Promecotheca opacicollis Gestro, 1897
18. Promecotheca palmella Gressitt, 1960
19. Promecotheca palmivora Gressitt, 1960
20. Promecotheca pandani Gressitt, 1960
21. Promecotheca papuana Csiki, 1900
22. Promecotheca petelii (Guérin-Méneville, 1840)
23. Promecotheca ptychospermae Maulik, 1935
24. Promecotheca pubescens Gressitt, 1957
25. Promecotheca pulchella Gestro, 1917
26. Promecotheca sacchari Gressitt, 1957
27. Promecotheca salomonina Spaeth, 1937
28. Promecotheca similis Uhmann, 1933
29. Promecotheca soror Maulik, 1929
30. Promecotheca straminipennis Weise, 1922
31. Promecotheca superba Pic, 1924
32. Promecotheca varipes Baly, 1858
33. Promecotheca violacea Uhmann, 1932
