= Promecotheca sacchari =

Scientific classification
- Kingdom: Animalia
- Phylum: Arthropoda
- Clade: Pancrustacea
- Class: Insecta
- Order: Coleoptera
- Suborder: Polyphaga
- Infraorder: Cucujiformia
- Family: Chrysomelidae
- Genus: Promecotheca
- Species: P. sacchari

Binomial name
- Promecotheca sacchari Gressitt, 1957

Species of beetle

Promecotheca sacchari is a species of beetle of the family Chrysomelidae. It is found on the Solomon Islands (Guadalcanal).

== Life history ==
The recorded host plants for this species are Saccharum (including Saccharum officinarum) and Miscanthus species.
