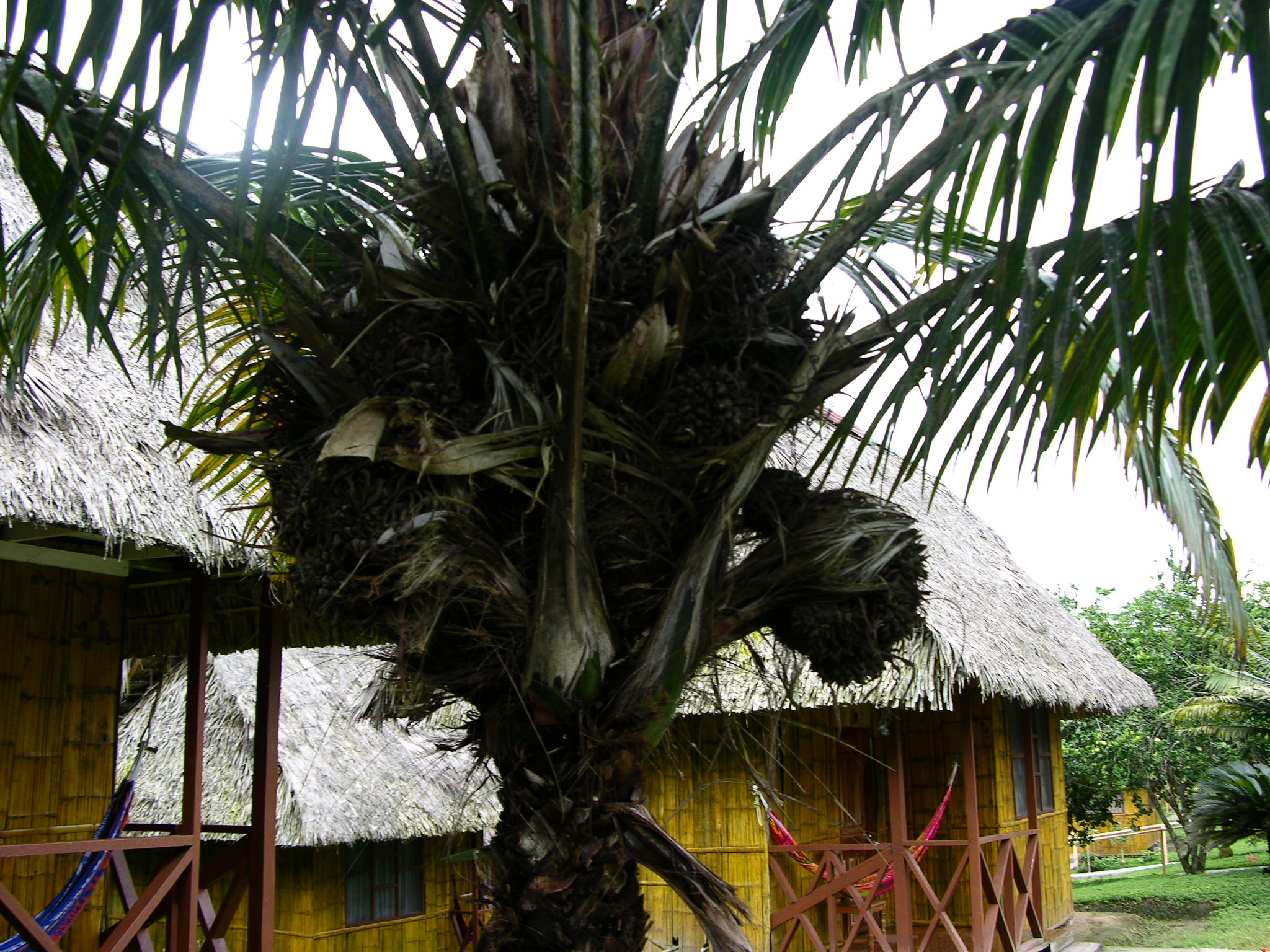
- Fruiting tagua palm (Phytelephas aequatorialis)

Scientific classification
- Kingdom: Plantae
- Clade: Tracheophytes
- Clade: Angiosperms
- Clade: Monocots
- Clade: Commelinids
- Order: Arecales
- Family: Arecaceae
- Subfamily: Ceroxyloideae
- Tribe: Phytelepheae
- Genus: Phytelephas; Ruiz & Pav.

Species
- Phytelephas aequatorialis Spruce; Phytelephas macrocarpa Ruiz & Pav.; Phytelephas olsonii R.W. Brown; Phytelephas schottii H.Wendl.; Phytelephas seemannii O.F.Cook; Phytelephas tenuicaulis (Barfod) A.J.Hend.; Phytelephas tumacana O.F.Cook

Synonyms
- Elephantusia Willd.; Palandra O.F.Cook; Yarina O.F.Cook

= Phytelephas =

Genus of palms

Phytelephas is a genus containing six known species of dioecious palms (family Arecaceae), occurring from southern Panama along the Andes to Ecuador, Bolivia, Colombia, northwestern Brazil, and Peru. They are commonly known as ivory palms, ivory-nut palms or tagua palms (/ˈtɑːɡwə, ˈtæɡ-/); the scientific name Phytelephas means "plant ivory" or more literally, "plant elephant". This and the first two of the common names refer to the very hard white endosperm of their seeds (tagua nuts or jarina seeds), which resembles elephant ivory.

== Description ==
They are medium-sized to tall palms reaching up to 20 m (66 ft) tall, with pinnate leaves. The "nut" is covered with pericarp, which gets removed by animals. The kernel is covered with a brown, flaky skin and shaped like a small avocado, roughly 4–8 cm in diameter. The male plants produce catkins up to 0.9 m (3 ft) in length of male flowers, each bearing up to one thousand stamens, the greatest number of any Monocot.

== Uses ==
Given trade restrictions in elephant ivory as well as animal welfare concerns, ivory palm endosperm is often used as a substitute for elephant ivory today, and traded under the names vegetable ivory, palm ivory, marfil-vegetal, corozo, tagua, or jarina. When dried out, it can be carved just like elephant ivory; it is often used for beads, buttons, figurines and jewelry, and can be dyed. More recently, palm ivory has been used in the production of bagpipes.

Vegetable ivory stimulates local economies in South America, provides an alternative to cutting down rainforests for farming, and prevents elephants from being killed for the ivory in their tusks.

In Ecuador, the Ecuadorean ivory palm (P. aequatorialis) is the species whose kernels are widely harvested. The large-fruited ivory palm (P. macrocarpa) is the ivory palm native to Brazil, and most internationally traded palm ivory is derived from this species. The Colombian ivory palm (P. schottii) and P. tenuicaulis, both formerly included in P. macrocarpa, are the usual source of the product in Colombia. The other two species are quite rare and have a restricted range; they are not used for tagua production on a significant scale.

The kernels are picked up from the ground after the ripe fruit has detached from the tree and forest animals have taken care of the pericarp, or harvested when ripe and the pericarp manually removed. As the nut shrinks when it hardens, a small hollow cavity can form in the center. It is often not possible to know whether the inside of the nut will have a small cavity in the center until it is cut into. Therefore, when carving, it is common to either incorporate the hole or cavity into carvings or not carve deep enough to reach a potential cavity.

In their native range, these palms are also used as a source of food and construction wood.

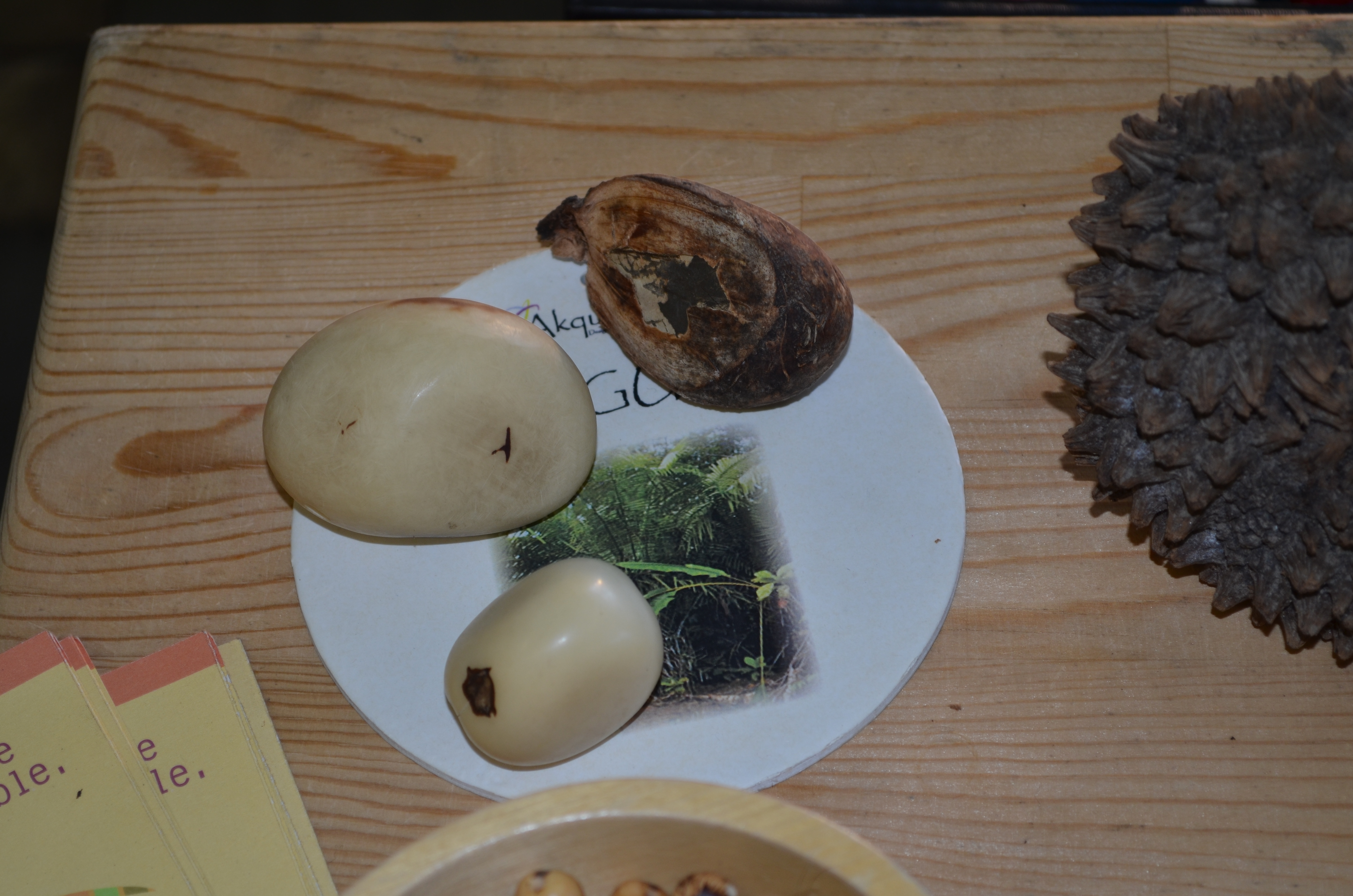

Tagua nuts before carving
Anticlockwise from right:
1. With pericarp
2. With brown skin
3. Without brown skin, partially sectioned to show hollow
4. Without brown skin, whole
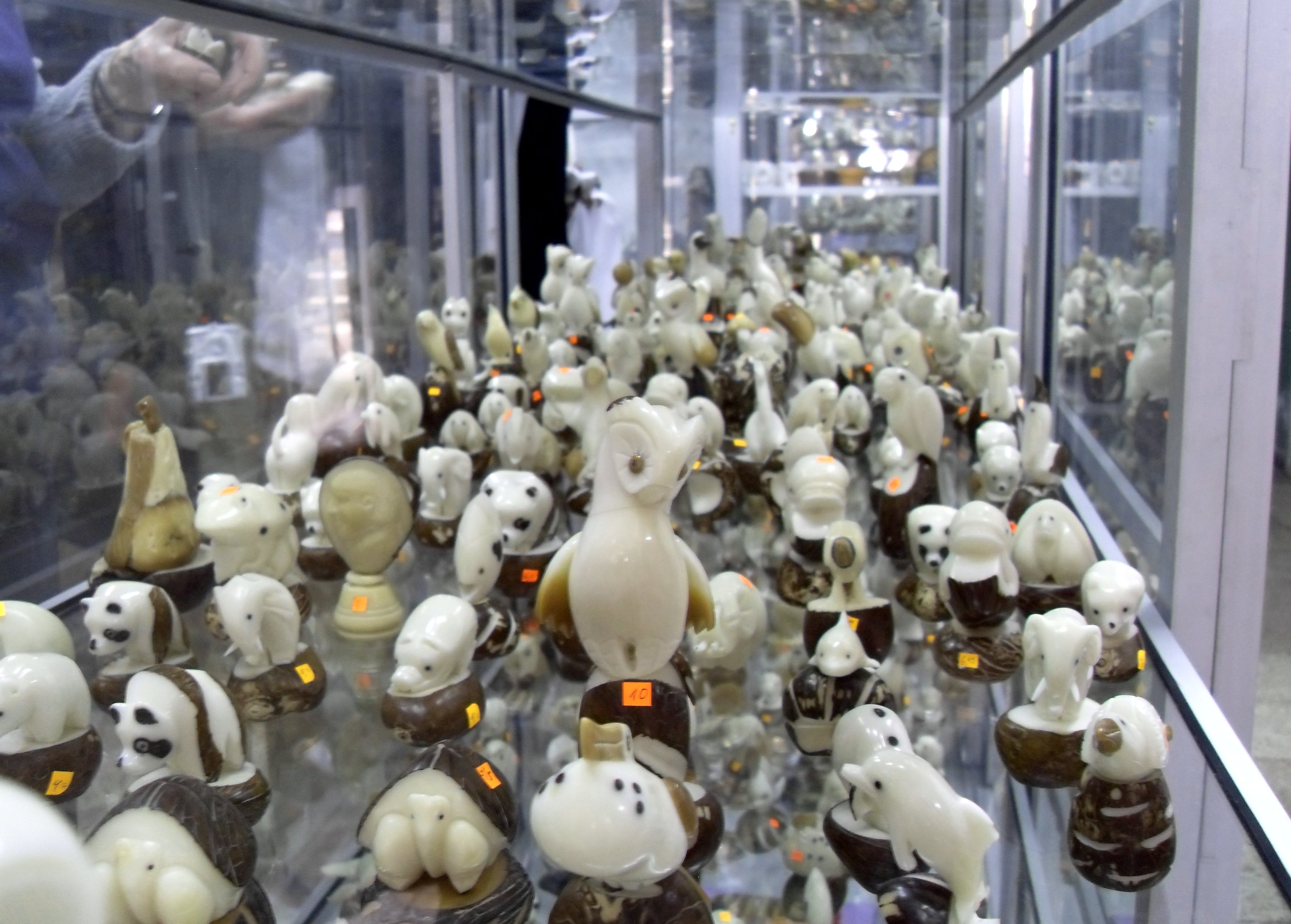
Tagua carvings

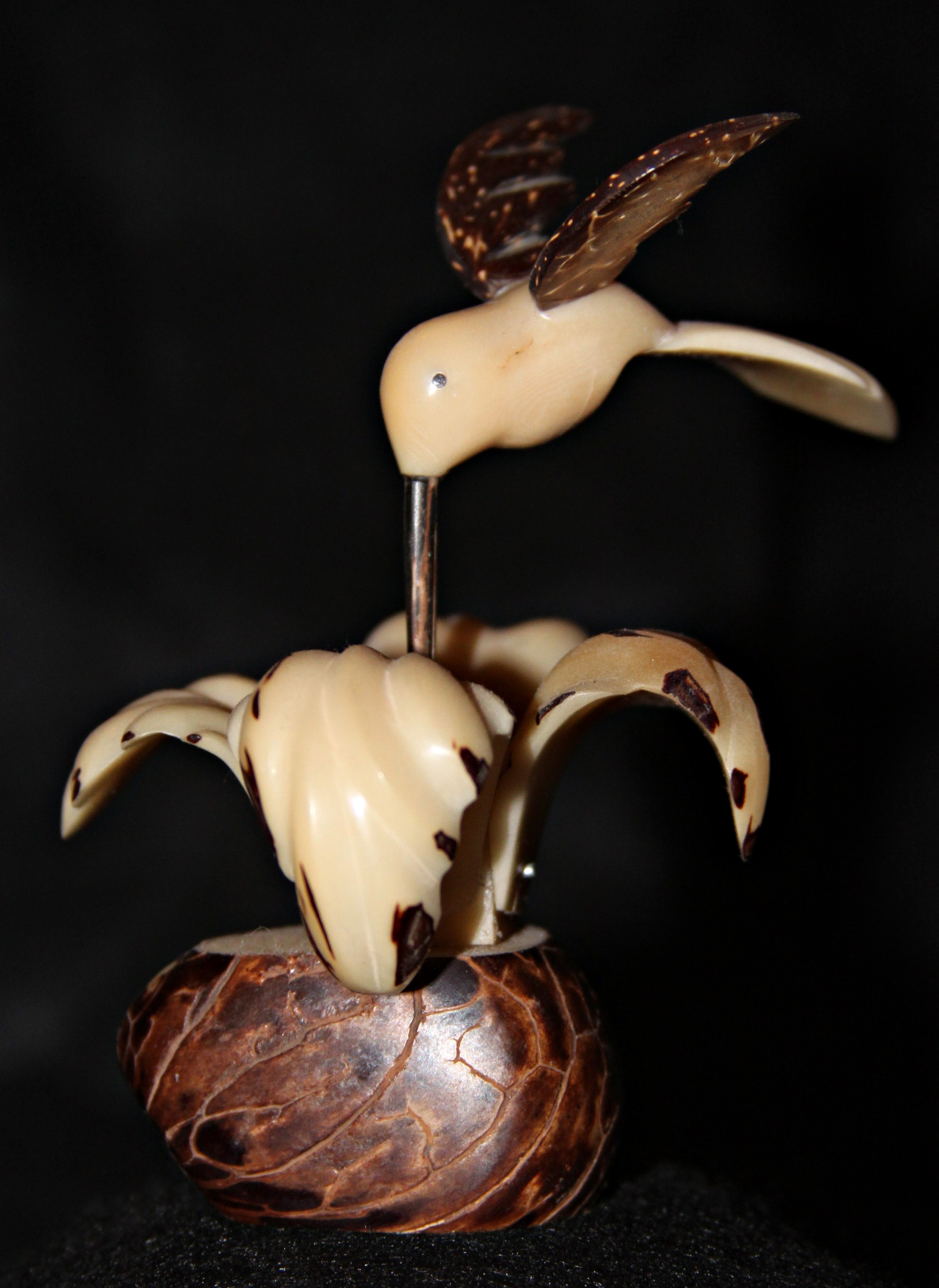
Ecuadorian handicraft

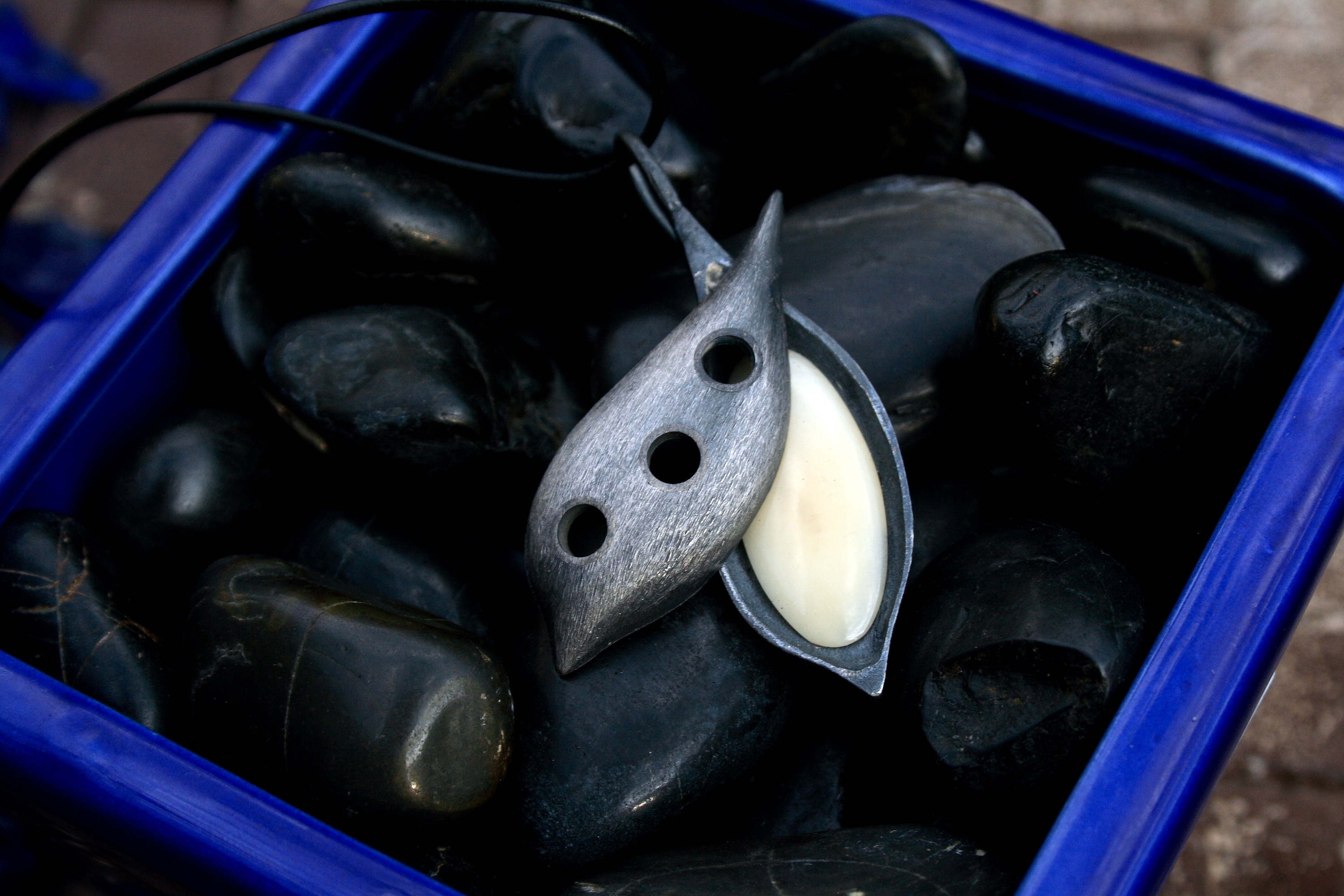
Silver locket with tagua center

== List of species ==
The following species are recognized:

Image	Scientific name	Common name	Distribution
	Phytelephas aequatorialis Spruce	Ecuadorean ivory palm	Ecuador
	Phytelephas macrocarpa Ruiz & Pav.	Large-fruited ivory palm	northwestern Brazil, Bolivia, Peru, Colombia
	Phytelephas olsonii R.W. Brown		Ecuador
	Phytelephas schottii H.Wendl.	Colombian ivory palm	Colombia
	Phytelephas seemannii O.F.Cook		Colombia, Panama
	Phytelephas tenuicaulis (Barfod) A.J.Hend.		Colombia, Ecuador, Peru
	Phytelephas tumacana O.F.Cook		Nariño Department of Colombia
