= Phytelephas tumacana =

Conservation status
- Endangered (IUCN 2.3)

Scientific classification
- Kingdom: Plantae
- Clade: Tracheophytes
- Clade: Angiosperms
- Clade: Monocots
- Clade: Commelinids
- Order: Arecales
- Family: Arecaceae
- Genus: Phytelephas
- Species: P. tumacana

Binomial name
- Phytelephas tumacana O.F.Cook

Species of palm

Phytelephas tumacana is a species of palm tree. It is endemic to Colombia, where it grows in forests near rivers. It is threatened by the destruction of habitat for agriculture.
