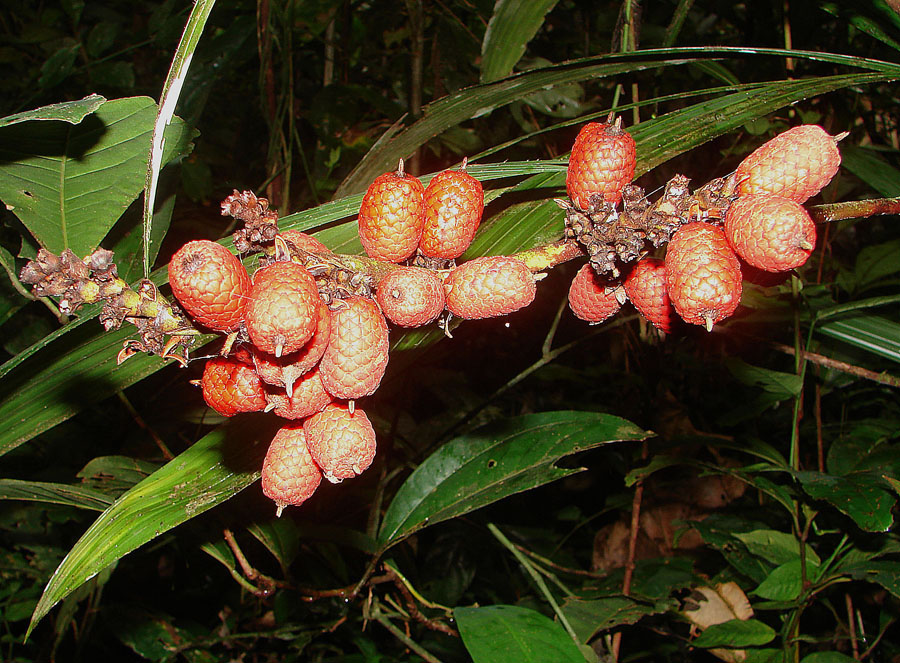
- Fruits of Mauritiella armata

Scientific classification
- Kingdom: Plantae
- Clade: Tracheophytes
- Clade: Angiosperms
- Clade: Monocots
- Clade: Commelinids
- Order: Arecales
- Family: Arecaceae
- Genus: Mauritiella
- Species: M. armata

Binomial name
- Mauritiella armata (Mart.) Burret

= Mauritiella armata =

Species of palm

Mauritiella armata is a species of flowering plant in the family Arecaceae. It is found in South America.
