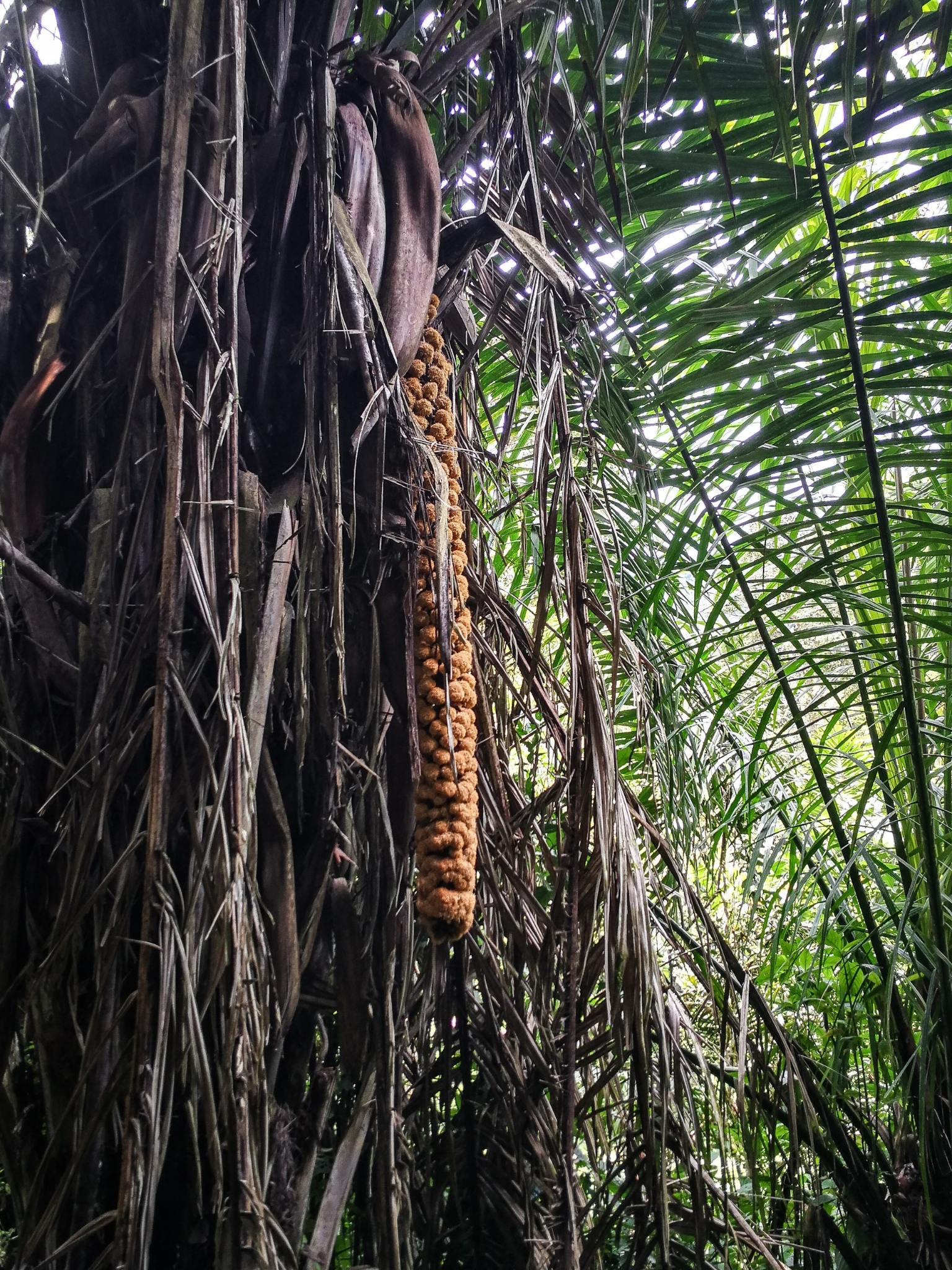

Conservation status
- Near Threatened (IUCN 3.1)

Scientific classification
- Kingdom: Plantae
- Clade: Tracheophytes
- Clade: Angiosperms
- Clade: Monocots
- Clade: Commelinids
- Order: Arecales
- Family: Arecaceae
- Genus: Phytelephas
- Species: P. aequatorialis

Binomial name
- Phytelephas aequatorialis Spruce

= Phytelephas aequatorialis =

Species of palm

The palm tree Phytelephas aequatorialis, commonly known as Ecuadorian ivory palm, is the main source of Ecuadorean vegetable ivory or tagua, a botanical alternative to ivory. It is found in the tropical rainforests of the western Andean slopes of Ecuador. It has a woody trunk which can grow to 20 metres (66 ft) tall, and has very long pinnate leaves.

== Description ==
The plants are dioecious, with the female individuals bearing large brown conical fruit, each approximately the size of a grapefruit (but occasionally up to 35 cm (14 in) in diameter and weighing up to 19 kg (42 lb) and covered in a horned husk, containing usually four seeds. Immature seeds contain sweet edible pulp. Mature seeds are harder than wood and are encased in a bonelike shell. The endosperm is a white hemicellulose material that is so hard it can be polished and carved like ivory. The male flowers are in a catkin, and each flower has as many as 1,000 stamens, the greatest number in any monocot. Uhl and Dransfield obtained an exact count of 954 stamens for one individual. The plant's genus name Phytelephas means "plant elephant". Three other species in this genus are sources of vegetable ivory as well.

== Animal consumption ==
The edible immature seeds are often dispersed by rainforest rodents such as agoutis. In some rural areas the trees are used to attract rodents, which are then captured for their meat.

Animals that feed on the fleshy mesocarp of the palm's fruit include squirrels (Sciurus aestuans), agoutis (Dasyprocta spp.), deer (Odocoileus virginianus), opossums (Marmosa spp.), porcupines (Coendou spp.), and Cuniculus paca.

== Cultivation ==
The palms are occasionally cultivated as a cash crop. International conservation organizations pay farmers for vegetable ivory in hopes that interest in the product will lead to resources being allotted for the protection of rainforests and the preservation of its flora.

Due to its commercial usefulness, the trees were usually preserved when rainforest was cleared for agricultural use.

== See also ==
- Vegetable ivory
