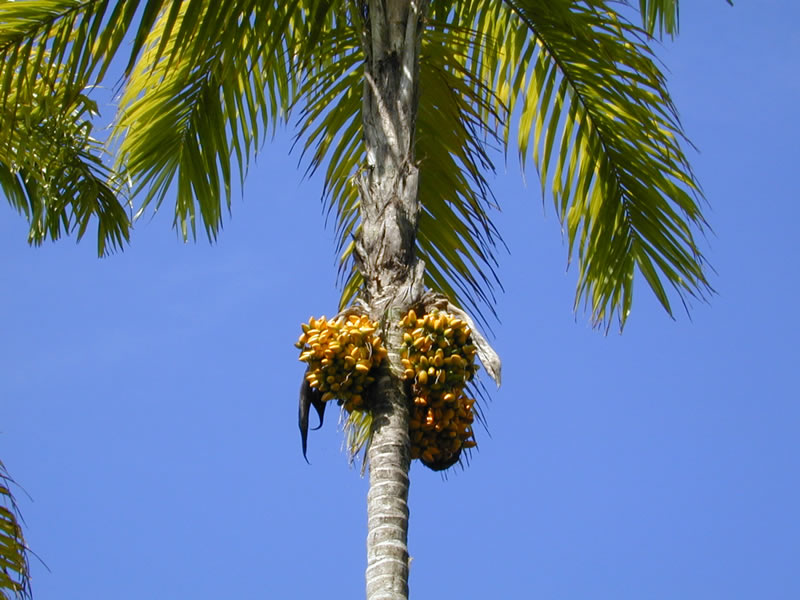

Scientific classification
- Kingdom: Plantae
- Clade: Tracheophytes
- Clade: Angiosperms
- Clade: Monocots
- Clade: Commelinids
- Order: Arecales
- Family: Arecaceae
- Genus: Bactris
- Species: B. gasipaes

Binomial name
- Bactris gasipaes Kunth
- Distribution of Bactris gasipaes.

Synonyms
- Guilielma gasipaes (Kunth) L.H.Bailey

= Bactris gasipaes =

Species of palm

Bactris gasipaes is a species of palm native to the tropical forests of Central and South America. It is well spread in these regions, where it is often cultivated by smallholders in agroforestry systems or more rarely, in monoculture. Common names include peach palm in English, among others used in South American countries. It is a long-lived perennial plant that is productive for 50 to 75 years on average. Its population has an important genetic diversity, leading to numerous fruits, colors, and qualities. The fruits are edible and nutritious but need to be cooked for 30 minutes to five hours. They also benefit many animals in the wild. Peach palms are also cultivated for the heart of palm, and the trunk can make valuable timber.

== Description ==
Bactris gasipaes, like most sea-island palms, grows erect, with a single slender stem or, more often, several stems that are up to eight inches (20 cm) thick, in a cluster; generally armed with stiff, black spines in circular rows from the base to the summit. There are occasional specimens with only a few spines. It can typically grow to 20 metres (66 ft) or taller. The trunk is composed of a hard outer ring of black fibers embedded in a lighter tan or light brown colored body. Fibers are more densely packed toward the outside of the tree trunk, becoming more and more sparse toward the center of the tree. The center core of the tree is soft and contains none of the darker vascular bundles that give the wood its characteristic look and hardness. The leaves are pinnate, 3 metres (9.8 ft) long on a 1 metre (3.3 ft) long petiole. The fruit is a drupe with edible pulp surrounding the single seed, 4–6 cm long and 3–5 cm broad. The rind (epicarp) of the fruit can be red, yellow, or orange when the fruit is ripe, depending on the variety of the palm.

== Ecology ==
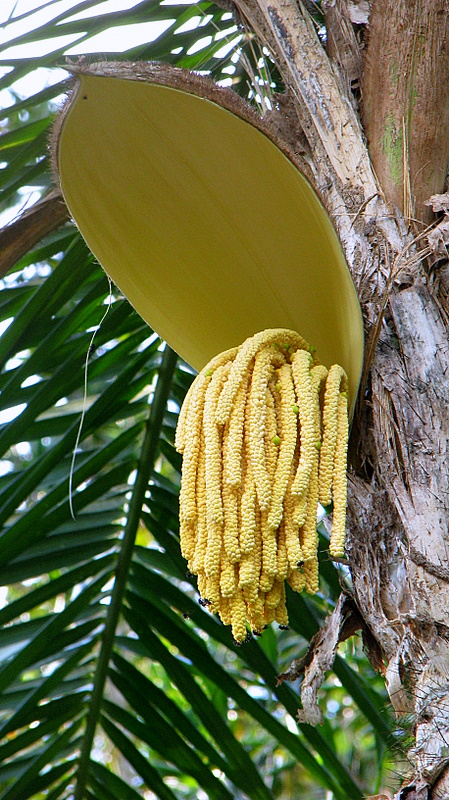
Inflorescence

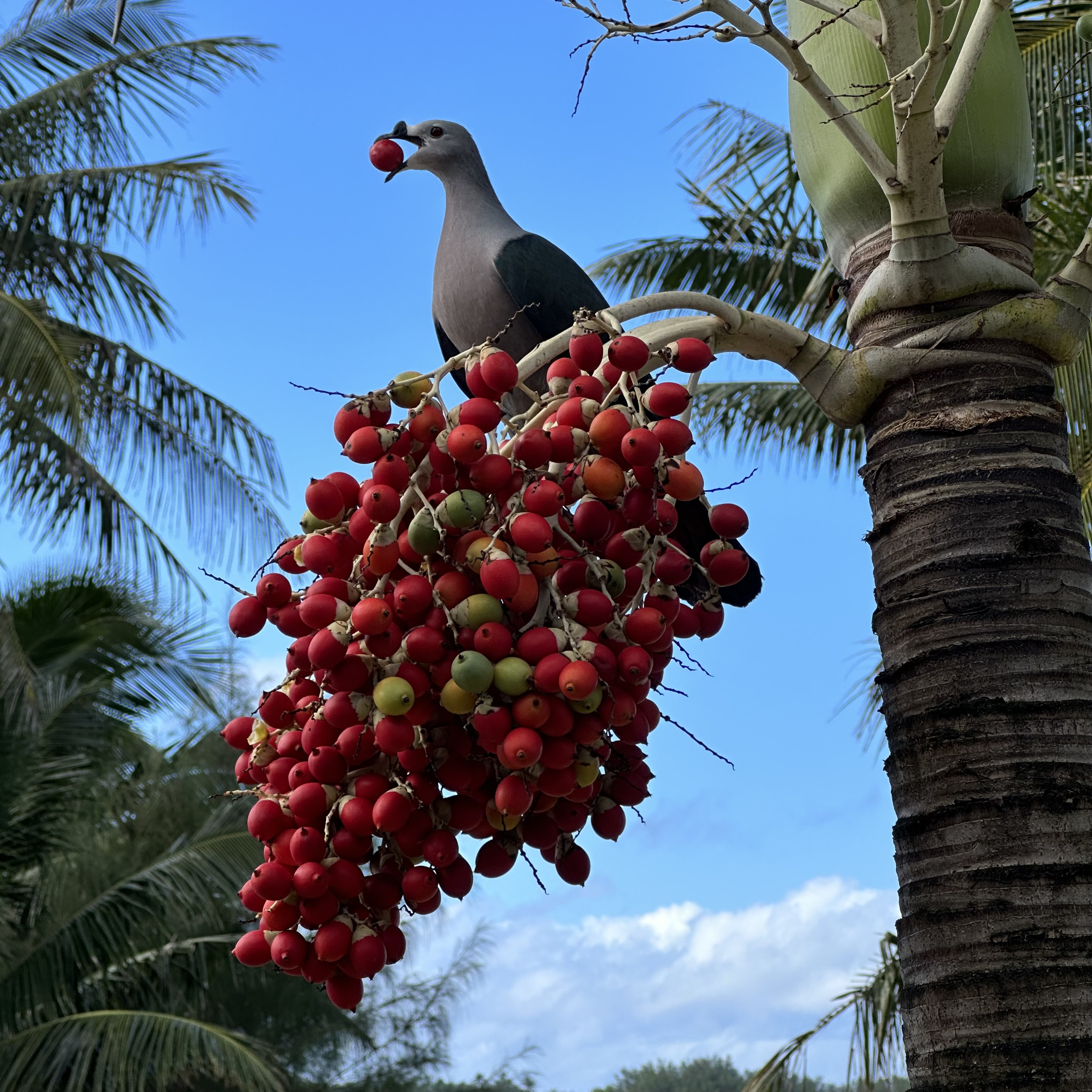
Pacific Imperial pigeon eating peach palm fruits

The peach palm grows wild in well-drained soils with various physical and chemical conditions, including acid and poor soils, since it is assisted by its association with mycorrhizas. It is grown in climates with annual precipitation between 2,000 and 5,000 millimetres (79 and 197 in) and annual mean temperatures exceeding 24 °C. The recommended altitude for commercial cultivation ranges from 0 to 800 metres (0 to 2,625 ft) asl. Peach palm is occasionally found at higher altitudes of up to 1800 m asl, as in Colombia's Cauca region El Tambo.

Peach palm can be considered the most important domesticated palm species of the Neotropics. Its wild and domesticated populations can be found in Central America, in the Pacific lowlands of Colombia and Ecuador, in Venezuela and in the area of the Amazon rainforest, especially at the eastern foothills of the Andes. The exact origin of the cultivated peach palm remains open to debate. The widespread cultivation of peach palm in the Americas reflects its capacity to adapt to a wide range of ecological conditions in the tropics and subtropics.

Wild and cultivated peach palm populations are genetically very diverse and could offer useful traits for breeding. Genetically, the peach palm can be divided into (a) two western populations including Central America, the Andean valleys of Colombia and Venezuela and the Pacific lowlands of Colombia and Ecuador; and (b) two eastern populations including the upper and the eastern Amazon. In general, the western populations have harder stems, more abundant and stronger spines, larger leaves and more solid rooting in their juvenile phase.

Peach palm is a predominantly outcrossing species, though self-fertilization has also been observed. Pollination is carried out mainly by insects, especially by small curculionid beetles over distances between 100 and 500 m. Wind and gravity can also function as pollen vectors. Since peach palm is a long-lived perennial and predominantly outcrossing species, the genetic diversity of the populations is high. Though no definite studies have been conducted on seed dispersal of peach palms, it is probably restricted locally to dispersal by birds and seed-gathering mammals. Seeds may only be occasionally dispersed by water of greater distances. The gene flow of outcrossing tree species with such scattered distribution may be restricted and could result in genetically distinct, isolated subpopulations with small effective population sizes. In contrast to the cultivated peach palm, wild populations are threatened by deforestation, driven mainly by agricultural expansion and the transition of forest to savannah. Many populations are now isolated by increasing forest fragmentation, which will lead to decreased reproduction via inbreeding depression and eventual extinction even without complete deforestation. Their natural distribution is not yet well defined. Wild peach palm trees can be found in disturbed ecosystems, on river banks and in primary forest gaps. They often occur in isolation or at low densities.

== Cultivation ==
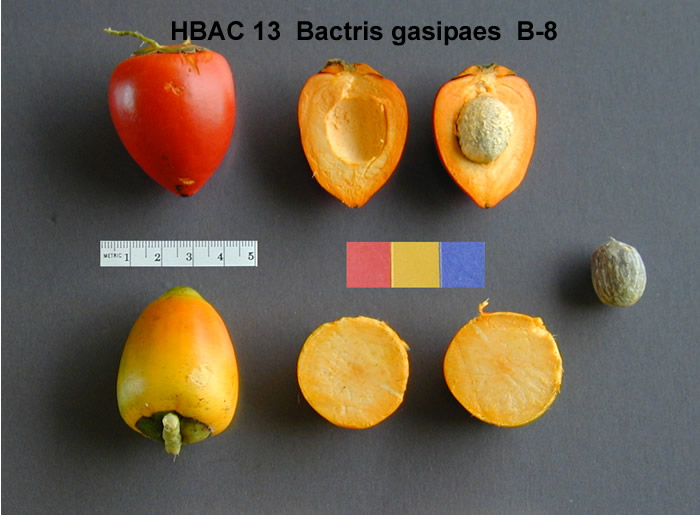
Sectioned fruit.

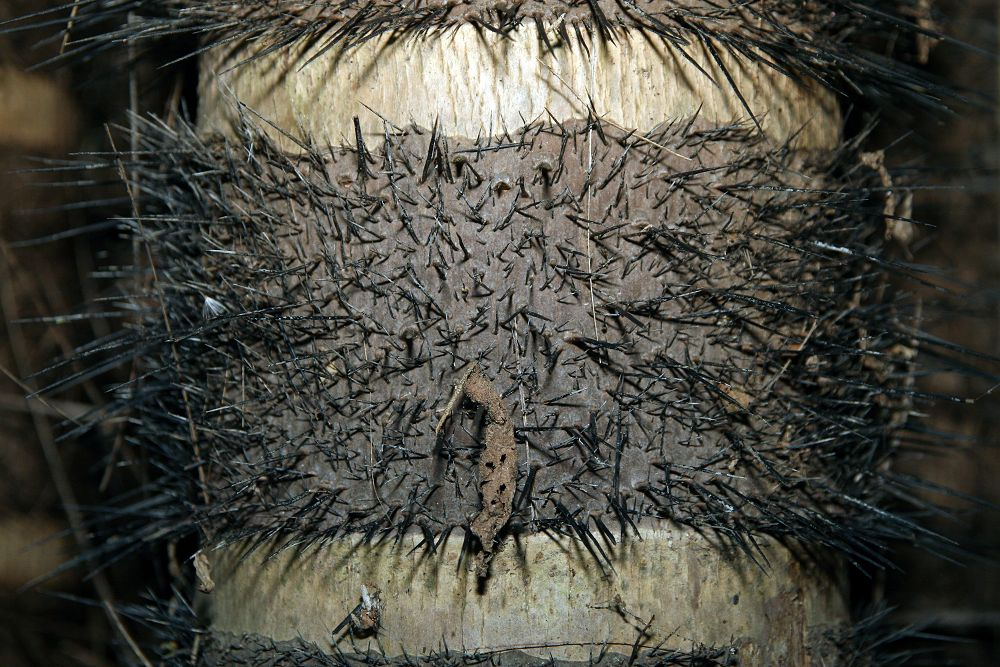
Spiny trunk.

=== Domestication ===
Bactris gasipaes was domesticated early in the occupation of the lowland humid neotropics by the indigenous people of the Americas during the pre-Columbian era. There are three hypotheses for the exact origin of cultivated peach palm: There was either (a) a single domestication event in the south western Amazon, (b) a single domestication event in the Colombian inter-Andean valleys and adjacent Pacific lowlands or (c) multiple independent centres of domestication.

Besides the fruits and seeds for human consumption, the pre-Columbian uses of the tree included the roots as medicine. The timber is exceptionally dense and strong; it had many uses. It is a durable material for bows, arrows, fishing poles, harpoons and building material, the spines for needles and the leaves for thatch and basketry. Though first used by humans for wood, it was likely fully domesticated for its starchy and oily fruits, and for the heart of palm, which is the most valued part in modern cultivation.

=== Agriculture ===
Peach palm has a rapid juvenile growth (1.5 – 2 m per year) and a moderate light interception if the plant is spaced appropriately. Therefore, it is suitable for agroforestry. In commercial plantations, peach palm is found in agroforestry systems with coffee and banana in Costa Rica. In several countries in Central and South America, it is found in combination with pineapple, papaya, passion fruit, maize, cassava and cacao. Fruit production starts between three and five years after planting and production lasts then for 50 to 75 years. The plant reaches its full productivity after about seven years.

Fertilizer requirements of Bactris gasipaes are dependent on the nutrient status of the soil and are usually adapted from heart of palm or from other palm fruit production. Phosphorus is considered the most limiting nutrient and yield is driven by phosphorus and magnesium rather than by nitrogen.

=== Animal feed ===
Peach palm fruit is widely used as animal feed. With its low fiber and high starch content, it can substitute maize in the fodder mixture. By ensiling the fruits, drying and heat treatment to deactivate the trypsin inhibitor can be avoided. However, a protein-rich additive is needed to enrich the silage of peach palm so it can be used to feed cattle. Peach palm fruit can further be used to feed fish, poultry and pigs and to produce multi-nutritional blocks for cows, goats and sheep.

=== Pests and diseases ===
The trunk of the tree can be infested with Phytophthora water molds. The foliage is infested with fungi of the genera Pestalotiopsis, Mycosphaerella, and Colletotrichum. The fruit is attacked by fungi of the genera Monilinia and Ceratocystis. Other pests include mites and insects (Metamasius hemipterus).

== Culinary uses ==
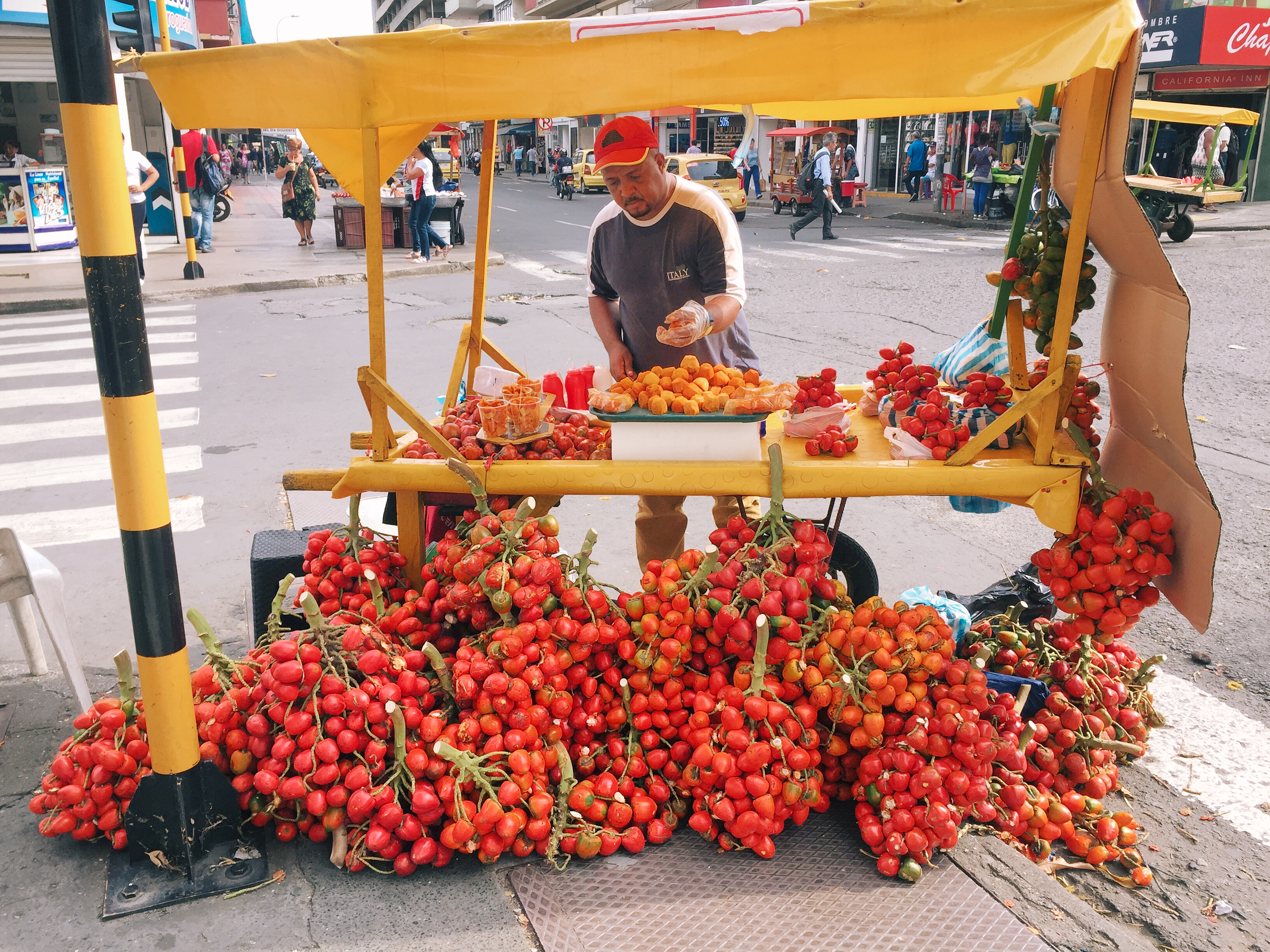
Bactris gasipaes sold at Cali, Colombia.

Fruit vendor with peach palm fruits

Bactris gasipaes has been used for food for centuries. Spanish explorers found a pejibaye plantation of 30,000 trees on the Atlantic coast of Costa Rica, providing fruit that replaced corn in the indigenous diet. The fruit is stewed in salted water and peeled, the seed is removed, and it may be flavored with salt or honey. The texture both raw and cooked has been compared to a firm sweet potato, and the flavor to hominy, dry squash or roasted chestnut. In some regions, the fruit halves are filled with mayonnaise or sour cream. Raw peach palm contains irritating calcium oxalate crystals that disappear under intense heat. Sellers of the fruit (often, street vendors) cook the fruit for 5 hours the night previous to the sale; however, recent studies have revealed that the same effect can be achieved in 30 minutes inside a pressure cooker, or even less in dry ovens or microwaves, without significantly altering the flavour of the final product. The raw fruit spoils quickly but it can be stored as a dry meal or preserves. It can yield flour and edible oil. Further, peach palm chips, currently produced in southern Colombia, are believed to have a large potential to enter mainstream markets.

This plant may also be harvested for heart of palm, and has commercial advantages in being fast growing; the first harvest can be from 18 to 24 months after planting. Brazil has a large domestic market for heart of palm and international demand is growing. It is also an economically important crop in Costa Rica. It is a viable substitute for other sources of heart of palm, such as overexploited native species of Euterpe, including Euterpe oleracea (açaí) and Euterpe edulis (juçara). It could also become a replacement crop for the threatened Fiji sago palm (Metroxylon vitiense).

== History ==
During the colonization of the Americas, the Spanish cut down 20,000 peach palms in Costa Rica in order to deprive and subjugate the indigenous population.

The palm was a staple in pre-Columbian times, and it became a neglected crop after the Spanish conquest. Even so, it has provided food security when needed.

== Vernacular names ==
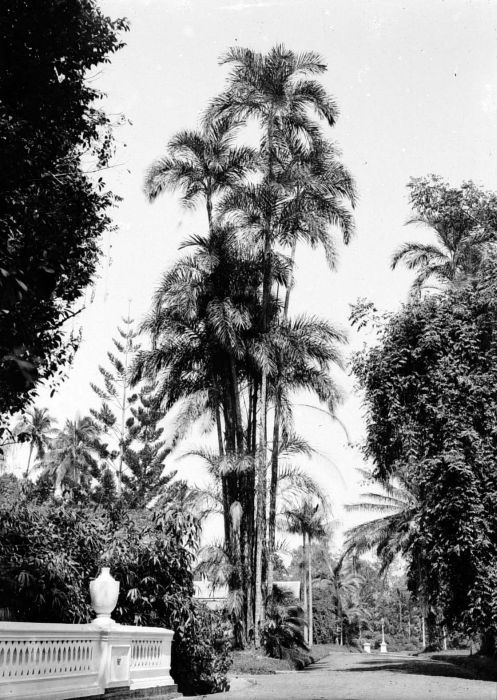
Growth habit.

- awara (Guyana)
- chonta or chontaduro (Ecuador)
- chontaduro or cachipay (Colombia)
- cor wary, supa (San Andrés archipelago)
- manaco (Guatemala)
- pejibaye (Costa Rica and the Dominican Republic)
- peewah (Trinidad and Tobago)
- pijibay, supa (Nicaragua and Honduras)
- pijiguao (Venezuela)
- pijuayo (Peru)
- pixbae or pivá or pifá (Panama)
- pupunha (Brazil)
- tembé (Bolivia)

The name of the pupunha in Proto-Tucanoan has been reconstructed as *ɨne.
