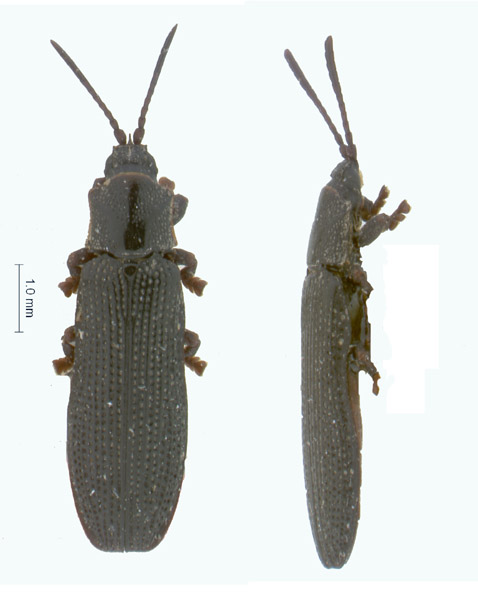

Scientific classification
- Kingdom: Animalia
- Phylum: Arthropoda
- Clade: Pancrustacea
- Class: Insecta
- Order: Coleoptera
- Suborder: Polyphaga
- Infraorder: Cucujiformia
- Family: Chrysomelidae
- Genus: Octodonta
- Species: O. affinis

Binomial name
- Octodonta affinis (Uhmann, 1935)

Synonyms
- Bronthispa affinis Uhmann, 1935

= Octodonta affinis =

Species of beetle

Octodonta affinis is a species of beetle of the family Chrysomelidae. It is found in Indonesia (Java).

== Life history ==
The recorded host plants for this species are Cocos nucifera and Metroxylon species.
