= Hispodonta sacsac =

Scientific classification
- Kingdom: Animalia
- Phylum: Arthropoda
- Class: Insecta
- Order: Coleoptera
- Suborder: Polyphaga
- Infraorder: Cucujiformia
- Family: Chrysomelidae
- Genus: Hispodonta
- Species: H. sacsac

Binomial name
- Hispodonta sacsac Gressitt, 1963

Species of beetle

Hispodonta sacsac is a species of beetle of the family Chrysomelidae. It is found in New Guinea.

== Description ==
Adults reach a length of about 7.6–9.6 mm. Adults are red with the elytron mostly purplish to bluish.

== Biology ==
This species has been found feeding on Metroxylon sagu and Calamus species.
