= Metroxylon paulcoxii =

Scientific classification
- Kingdom: Plantae
- Clade: Tracheophytes
- Clade: Angiosperms
- Clade: Monocots
- Clade: Commelinids
- Order: Arecales
- Family: Arecaceae
- Genus: Metroxylon
- Species: M. paulcoxii

Binomial name
- Metroxylon paulcoxii McClatchey

Species of plant

Metroxylon paulcoxii is a species of palm endemic to Samoa. It is reported there from the islands of 'Upolu and Savai'i. The species is named in honor of ethnobotanist Paul Alan Cox.

Metroxylon paulcoxii can attain a height of 10 metres (33 ft), with a non-branching trunk up to 45 centimetres (18 in) in diameter. Leaves are pinnately compound, with spines on the sheaths, petioles, and leaf margins. Leaflets can number as many as 150, each up to 8 centimetres (3.1 in) wide and 100 centimetres (39 in) long. Inflorescences have second-order branching, with as many as 450 flowers per branch. Flowers are 5–10 millimetres (0.20–0.39 in) wide, with staminate (male), pistillate (female), and hermaphroditic flowers frequently present on the same plant. Fruits are pear-shaped, fibrous and corky, up to 7 centimetres (2.8 in) long. Seeds are spherical, up to 3.7 centimetres (1.5 in) in diameter.

The species is similar to M. warburgii (also present in Samoa), but with shorter leaflets and with second-order branching in the inflorescence instead of third-order.
