= Hispodonta sagu =

Scientific classification
- Kingdom: Animalia
- Phylum: Arthropoda
- Class: Insecta
- Order: Coleoptera
- Suborder: Polyphaga
- Infraorder: Cucujiformia
- Family: Chrysomelidae
- Genus: Hispodonta
- Species: H. sagu

Binomial name
- Hispodonta sagu Gressitt, 1963

Species of beetle

Hispodonta sagu is a species of beetle of the family Chrysomelidae. It is found in New Guinea.

== Description ==
Adults reach a length of about 8.6–10.05 mm. Adults are orange-red. The elytron is steel blue, except for the extreme apex.

== Biology ==
This species has been found feeding on Metroxylon sagu.
