= Hispodonta palmicola =

Scientific classification
- Kingdom: Animalia
- Phylum: Arthropoda
- Class: Insecta
- Order: Coleoptera
- Suborder: Polyphaga
- Infraorder: Cucujiformia
- Family: Chrysomelidae
- Genus: Hispodonta
- Species: H. palmicola

Binomial name
- Hispodonta palmicola Gressitt, 1960

Species of beetle

Hispodonta palmicola is a species of beetle of the family Chrysomelidae. It is found in New Guinea.

== Description ==
Adults reach a length of about 8.75–10.75 mm. Adults are pale orange. The posterior three-fourth of the elytral disc is purplish black.

== Biology ==
This species has been found feeding on Metroxylon species and other palm species.
