= Octodonta subparallela =

Scientific classification
- Kingdom: Animalia
- Phylum: Arthropoda
- Clade: Pancrustacea
- Class: Insecta
- Order: Coleoptera
- Suborder: Polyphaga
- Infraorder: Cucujiformia
- Family: Chrysomelidae
- Genus: Octodonta
- Species: O. subparallela

Binomial name
- Octodonta subparallela Spaeth, 1936

Species of beetle

Octodonta subparallela is a species of beetle of the family Chrysomelidae. It is found in New Britain, New Guinea and New Ireland.

== Life history ==
The recorded host plants for this species are Calamus and Metroxylon species, as well as Korthalsia beccarii.
