= Hispodonta vicina =

Scientific classification
- Kingdom: Animalia
- Phylum: Arthropoda
- Class: Insecta
- Order: Coleoptera
- Suborder: Polyphaga
- Infraorder: Cucujiformia
- Family: Chrysomelidae
- Genus: Hispodonta
- Species: H. vicina

Binomial name
- Hispodonta vicina Gressitt, 1963

Species of beetle

Hispodonta vicina is a species of beetle of the family Chrysomelidae. It is found in New Guinea.

== Description ==
Adults reach a length of about 9.4–10.6 mm. Adults are orange-red, with the posterior half of the disc greenish blue.

== Biology ==
This species has been found feeding on Metroxylon species.
