= Octodonta maffinensis =

Scientific classification
- Kingdom: Animalia
- Phylum: Arthropoda
- Clade: Pancrustacea
- Class: Insecta
- Order: Coleoptera
- Suborder: Polyphaga
- Infraorder: Cucujiformia
- Family: Chrysomelidae
- Genus: Octodonta
- Species: O. maffinensis

Binomial name
- Octodonta maffinensis Gressitt, 1957

Species of beetle

Octodonta maffinensis is a species of beetle of the family Chrysomelidae. It is found in north-central New Guinea.

== Life history ==
The recorded host plants for this species are Calamus, Metroxylon and Cocos species.
