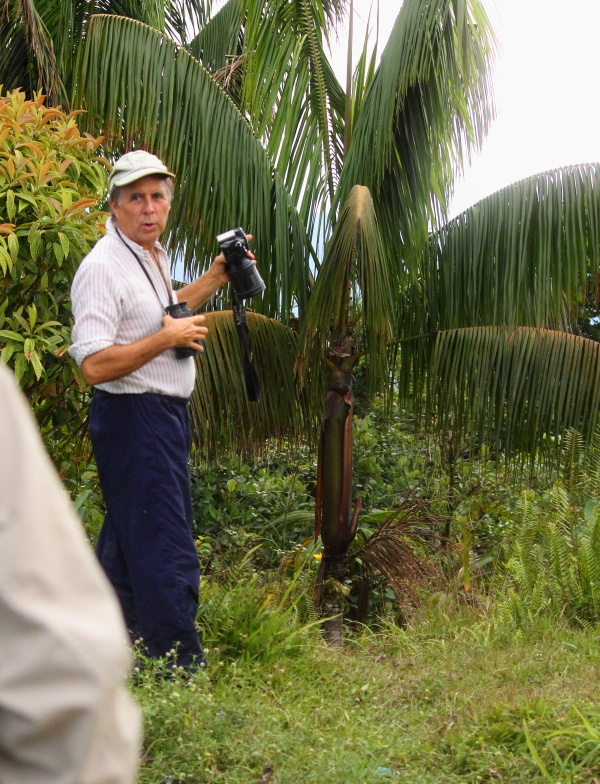

Scientific classification
- Kingdom: Plantae
- Clade: Tracheophytes
- Clade: Angiosperms
- Clade: Monocots
- Clade: Commelinids
- Order: Arecales
- Family: Arecaceae
- Genus: Euterpe
- Species: E. broadwayi

Binomial name
- Euterpe broadwayi Becc. ex Broadway

Synonyms
- Euterpe broadwayana Becc. Euterpe dominicana L.H.Bailey)

= Euterpe broadwayi =

Species of palm

Euterpe broadwayi, the manac, or manicol, is a tall, slender-stemmed, pinnate-leaved palm native to Trinidad and Tobago, Grenada, Saint Vincent and the Grenadines and Dominica. Stems usually grow in a cluster and are 8–20 metres tall and 20–25 centimetres in diameter and bear 10–16 leaves.

It is sometimes harvested for palm heart.

== Description ==
Euterpe broadwayi is a small palm, usually with 2 or 3 stems that are grey in colour, 8 to 20 metres (26 to 66 ft) tall, and 20 to 25 centimetres (8 to 10 in) in diameter. The stem ends in a cone of roots that may be up to 2 metres (6 ft 7 in) long.

== Distribution ==
The species is found in Trinidad, Tobago, Grenada, St. Vincent and Dominica, on exposed mountain ridges and steep river valleys.
