= Hispodonta loriae =

Scientific classification
- Kingdom: Animalia
- Phylum: Arthropoda
- Class: Insecta
- Order: Coleoptera
- Suborder: Polyphaga
- Infraorder: Cucujiformia
- Family: Chrysomelidae
- Genus: Hispodonta
- Species: H. loriae

Binomial name
- Hispodonta loriae Gestro, 1913

Species of beetle

Hispodonta loriae is a species of beetle of the family Chrysomelidae. It is found in New Guinea.

== Description ==
Adults reach a length of about 7.9–9.5 mm. Adults are red with the posterior half of the elytron purple.

== Biology ==
This species has been found feeding on Metroxylon sagu.
