= Octodonta nipae =

Scientific classification
- Kingdom: Animalia
- Phylum: Arthropoda
- Clade: Pancrustacea
- Class: Insecta
- Order: Coleoptera
- Suborder: Polyphaga
- Infraorder: Cucujiformia
- Family: Chrysomelidae
- Genus: Octodonta
- Species: O. nipae

Binomial name
- Octodonta nipae (Maulik, 1921)

Synonyms
- Plesispa nipae Maulik, 1921

Species of beetle

Octodonta nipae is a species of beetle of the family Chrysomelidae. It is found in China (Hainan) and Malaysia.

== Life history ==
The recorded host plants for this species are Nipa fruticans, Metroxylon sagu, Oncosperma species, Areca catechu, Calamus manan, Washingtonia filifera, Phoenix canariensis, Phoenix hanceana, Washingtonia robusta, Aarchontophoenix alexandrae, Chrysalidocarpus lutescens, Cocos nucifera, Elaeis guineensis, Hyophorbe lagenicaulis, Livistonia chinensis, Roystonea regia, Syagrus romanzoffiana, Trachycarpus fortunei and Phoenix roebelenii.
