= Hispodonta metroxylona =

Scientific classification
- Kingdom: Animalia
- Phylum: Arthropoda
- Class: Insecta
- Order: Coleoptera
- Suborder: Polyphaga
- Infraorder: Cucujiformia
- Family: Chrysomelidae
- Genus: Hispodonta
- Species: H. metroxylona

Binomial name
- Hispodonta metroxylona Gressitt, 1960

Species of beetle

Hispodonta metroxylona is a species of beetle of the family Chrysomelidae. It is found in New Guinea.

== Description ==
Adults reach a length of about 7.4–8.65 mm. Adults are red, with the elytral disc blue and a pale margin.

== Biology ==
This species has been found feeding on Metroxylon sagu.
