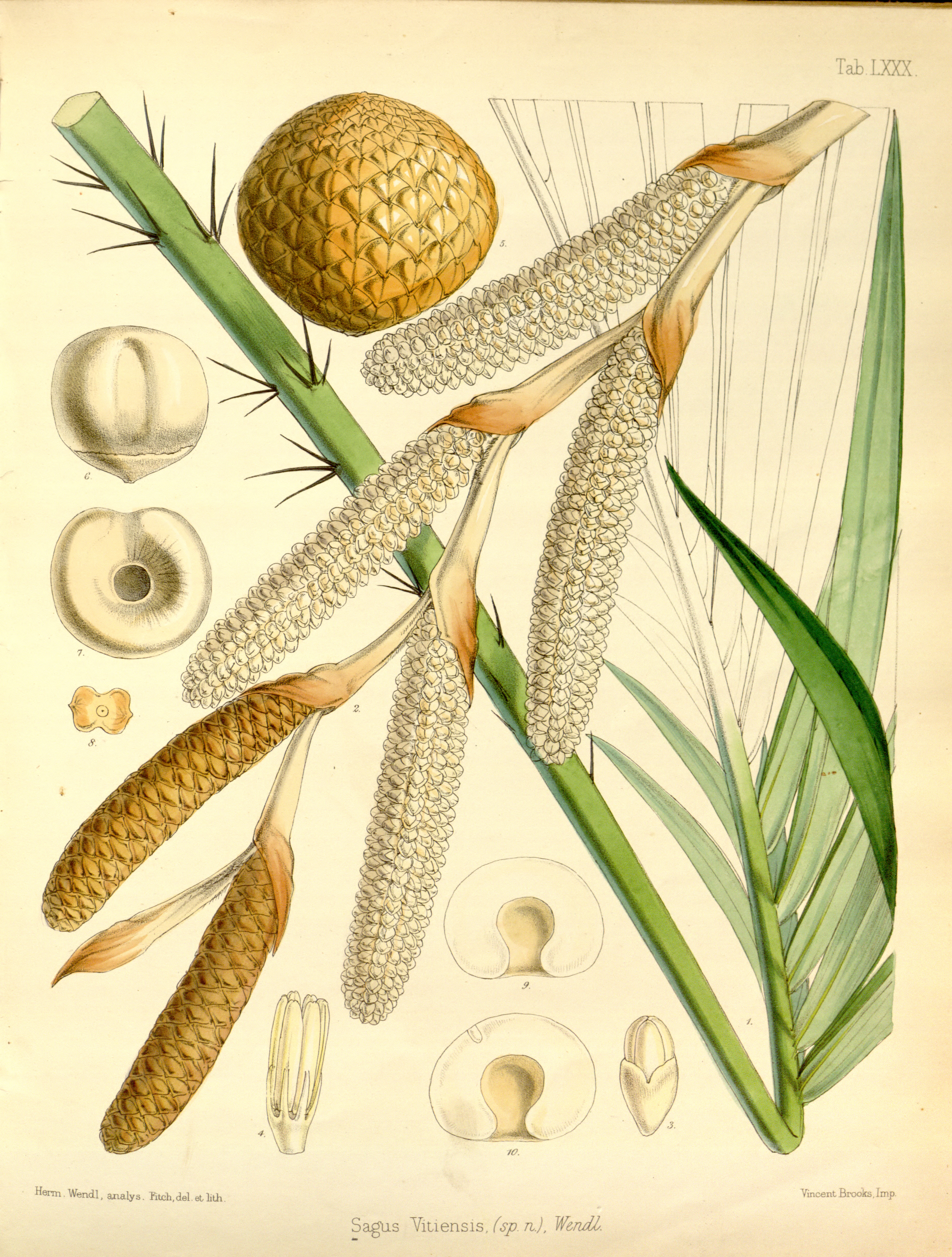
- illustration circa 1870

Conservation status
- Endangered (IUCN 3.1)

Scientific classification
- Kingdom: Plantae
- Clade: Embryophytes
- Clade: Tracheophytes
- Clade: Spermatophytes
- Clade: Angiosperms
- Clade: Monocots
- Clade: Commelinids
- Order: Arecales
- Family: Arecaceae
- Genus: Metroxylon
- Species: M. vitiense

Binomial name
- Metroxylon vitiense (H. Wendland); H. Wendland ex Bentham & Hooker f.

= Metroxylon vitiense =

Species of palm

Metroxylon vitiense (vitiense - originating in Fiji, also known as the Fiji sago palm) is a species of flowering plant in the family Arecaceae, endemic to the islands of Fiji (hence its specific name vitiense, "of Viti", meaning Fiji in Fijian), Ovalau, and Vanua Levu in Fiji. There is only one confirmed occurrence of M. vitiense on Vanua Levu, just outside Savusavu. Despite it being considered a threatened species by the IUCN, as of February 2013 M. vitiense was still unprotected by Fijian regulations and international legislation. The palm has also been reported as living on the nearby islands of Wallis and Futuna.

Metroxylon vitiense, like many species of Metroxylon, has previously been classified under the genera Coelococcus and Sagus. M. vitiense was previously classified as Coelococcus vitiensis (H. Wendl. ex Seem.) and Sagus vitiensis (H. Wendl. ex Seem.), although these are now non-preferred scientific names. The palm is also known by the following names in Fiji: soga, sogo, seko, and niu soria.

== Description ==
Metroxylon vitiense commonly grows in swampy forests. Formerly, it was common near Navua, Viti Levu, but is now found only in the more inaccessible swampy valley forests. The locations on Viti Levu, specifically in the Rewa River Delta, where M. vitiense has been historically common, coincide with areas that have recently experienced increased human population growth.

Metroxylon vitiense will grow between 5 and 16 m (16 and 52 ft) tall and its trunk will grow to a diameter of 36 to 50 cm (14 to 20 in). The leaf base and petiole are covered with rows of pointy spines. It takes approximately 20 years of growth before the palm begins to bear fruit. Its fruit can vary in color and shape, even within the same stand of trees, similar to other species of Metroxylon. The fruit is round but not always spherical; it can be elliptical or ovular in shape. The fruit has scales, similar to a pineapple, but whose color varies from green to golden yellow to dark brown to grey. Like other species of Metroxylon, M. vitiense propagates by seed, which germinates from its fruit. The palm is monocarpic and dies after it flowers and sets seeds, similar to the century plant and the Hawaiian silversword.

== Cultivation and uses ==
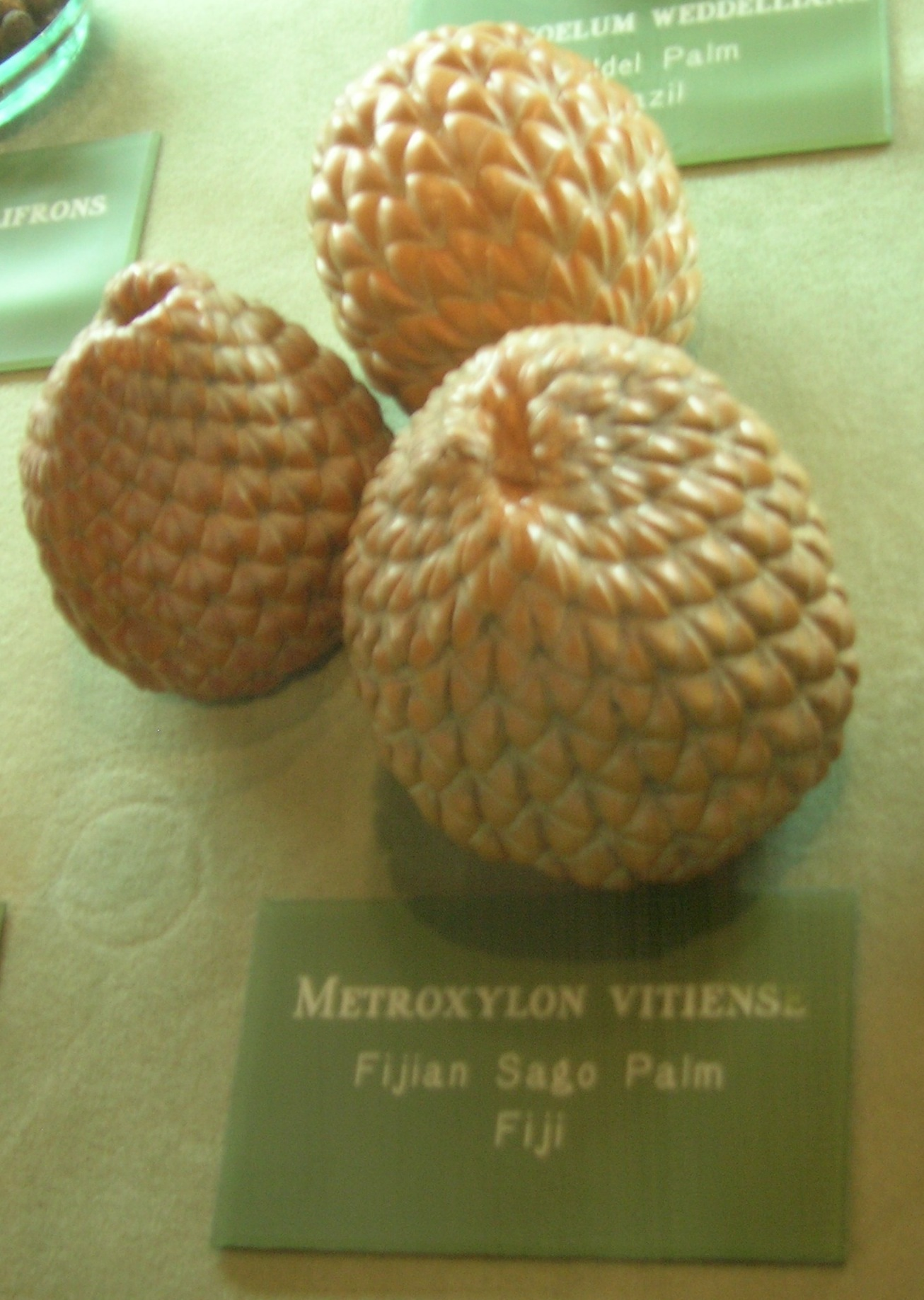
Fruit of Metroxylon vitiense

The palm thrives near rivers and in marshy areas and its buoyant fruit will often land in water and float until they find suitable places to grow. Remains of partially eaten M. vitiense fruit indicate that bats and the masked shining parrot also act as dispersal vectors.

Growth in Fiji's tourism industry has resulted in increased use of Fiji sago palm leaves for thatching roofs, especially by hotels, because roofing material made from its leaves can withstand Fiji's tropical climate for about 10 years. Prior to its listing as threatened, Metroxylon vitiense was considered to be a source of superior thatch and edible heart of palm for a few communities in Fiji although its historic use as a famine food is questionable. Metroxylon vitiense is harvested as a source of food for heart of palm and sago. Fiji Islanders prefer the hearts of M. vitiense for their "sweet, crispy and delicate flavour" and residents of some Fijian communities use them as the main ingredient in curries.

Unsustainable harvesting of Metroxylon vitiense without replanting has resulted in a reduction of almost 50% in the size and distribution of the surviving species population. Rats also feed on young shoots, killing potential new growth. Bactris gasipaes, also known as the peach palm, is being considered and tested as a replacement crop for harvesting palm hearts, also having the added benefit of producing a drupe (or palm peach) with edible pulp surrounding its single seed.
