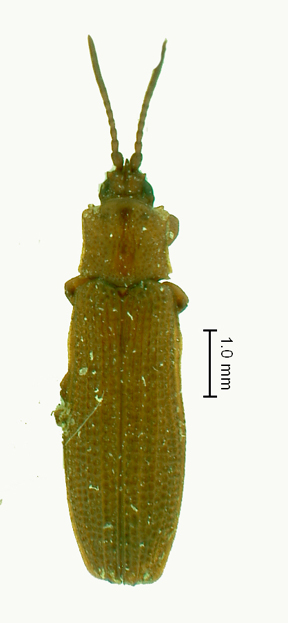

Scientific classification
- Kingdom: Animalia
- Phylum: Arthropoda
- Clade: Pancrustacea
- Class: Insecta
- Order: Coleoptera
- Suborder: Polyphaga
- Infraorder: Cucujiformia
- Family: Chrysomelidae
- Genus: Octodonta
- Species: O. depressa

Binomial name
- Octodonta depressa Chapuis, 1875

Synonyms
- Downesia (Paradownesia) anceyi Pic, 1924

= Octodonta depressa =

Species of beetle

Octodonta depressa is a species of beetle of the family Chrysomelidae. It is found in Indonesia (Java, Sumatra), Malaysia, the Philippines (Mindanao), Taiwan, Thailand and Vietnam.

== Life history ==
The recorded host plants for this species are Normanbya merrillii, Cocos nucifera and Calamus species.
