= Hispodonta plagiata =

Scientific classification
- Kingdom: Animalia
- Phylum: Arthropoda
- Class: Insecta
- Order: Coleoptera
- Suborder: Polyphaga
- Infraorder: Cucujiformia
- Family: Chrysomelidae
- Genus: Hispodonta
- Species: H. plagiata

Binomial name
- Hispodonta plagiata Baly, 1887

Species of beetle

Hispodonta plagiata is a species of beetle of the family Chrysomelidae. It is found in India.
