= Hispodonta forticornis =

Scientific classification
- Kingdom: Animalia
- Phylum: Arthropoda
- Clade: Pancrustacea
- Class: Insecta
- Order: Coleoptera
- Suborder: Polyphaga
- Infraorder: Cucujiformia
- Family: Chrysomelidae
- Genus: Hispodonta
- Species: H. forticornis

Binomial name
- Hispodonta forticornis Heller, 1916

Species of beetle

Hispodonta forticornis is a species of beetle of the family Chrysomelidae. It is found in Indonesia (Sulawesi).
