= Octodonta =

Scientific classification
- Kingdom: Animalia
- Phylum: Arthropoda
- Clade: Pancrustacea
- Class: Insecta
- Order: Coleoptera
- Suborder: Polyphaga
- Infraorder: Cucujiformia
- Family: Chrysomelidae
- Subfamily: Cassidinae
- Tribe: Cryptonychini
- Genus: Octodonta; Chapuis, 1875

Synonyms
- Octodonta (Uhmannia) Spaeth, 1936

Genus of leaf beetles

Octodonta is a genus of beetles belonging to the family Chrysomelidae.

== Species ==
- Octodonta affinis (Uhmann, 1935)
- Octodonta angulosa (Uhmann, 1930)
- Octodonta banguiensis (Uhmann, 1933)
- Octodonta depressa Chapuis, 1875
- Octodonta korthalsiae Gressitt, 1960
- Octodonta maffinensis Gressitt, 1957
- Octodonta nipae (Maulik, 1921)
- Octodonta subparallela Spaeth, 1936
- Octodonta surigaoana (Uhmann, 1933)
