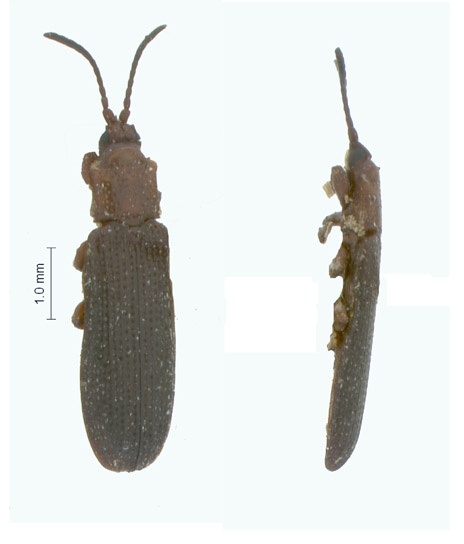

Scientific classification
- Kingdom: Animalia
- Phylum: Arthropoda
- Clade: Pancrustacea
- Class: Insecta
- Order: Coleoptera
- Suborder: Polyphaga
- Infraorder: Cucujiformia
- Family: Chrysomelidae
- Genus: Octodonta
- Species: O. banguiensis

Binomial name
- Octodonta banguiensis (Uhmann, 1933)

Synonyms
- Bronthispa banguiensis Uhmann, 1933

= Octodonta banguiensis =

Species of beetle

Octodonta banguiensis is a species of beetle of the family Chrysomelidae. It is found in the Philippines (Luzon).

== Life history ==
The recorded host plant for this species is Cocos nucifera.

== Taxonomy ==
The species was described as Bronthispa banguiensis by Erich Uhmann in 1933 in the article Neues uber philippinische Hispinen. 40. Beitrag zur Kenntnis der Hispinen, which was published in the journal Folia Zoologica et Hydrobiologica.
