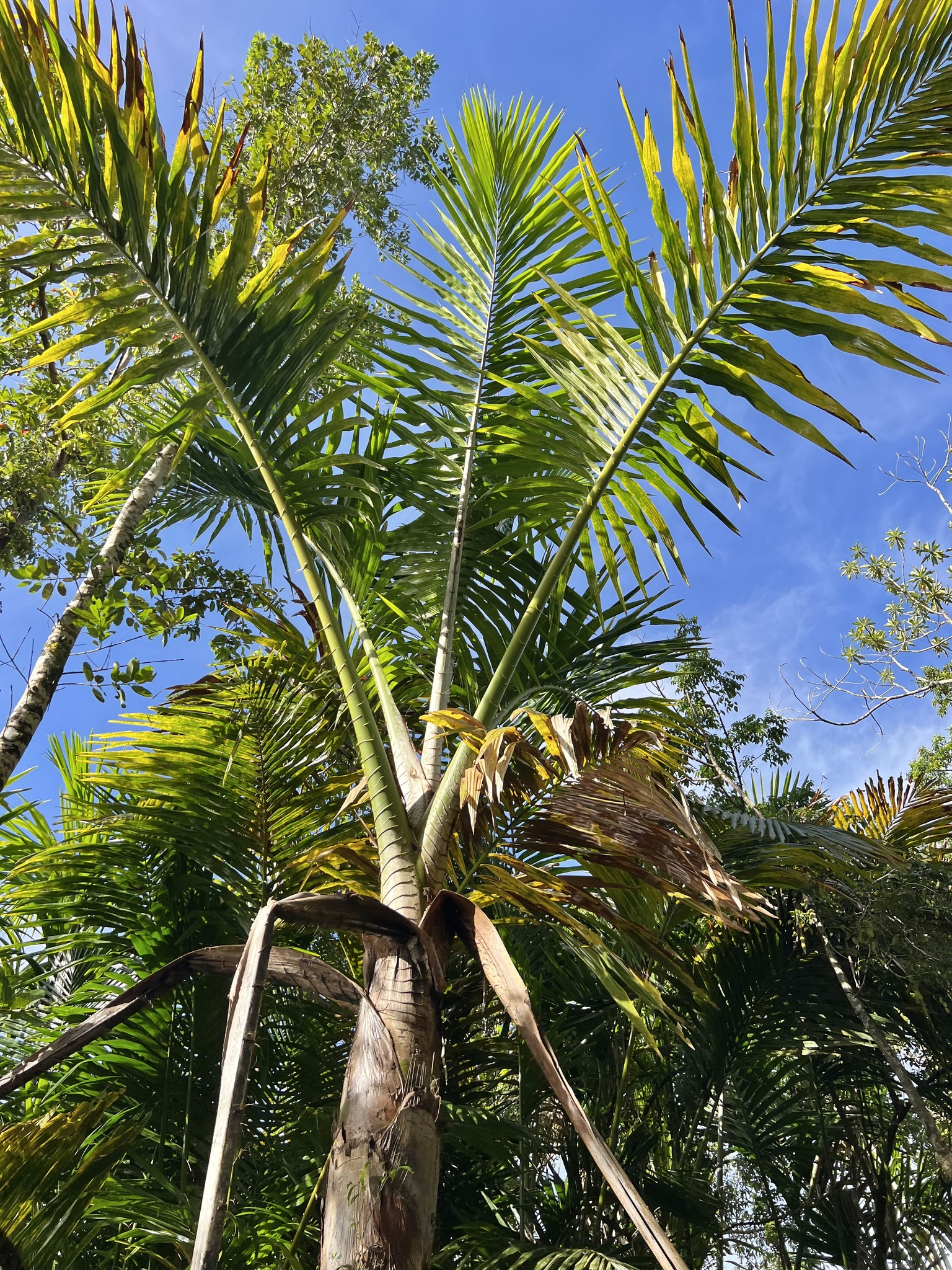

Scientific classification
- Kingdom: Plantae
- Clade: Embryophytes
- Clade: Tracheophytes
- Clade: Spermatophytes
- Clade: Angiosperms
- Clade: Monocots
- Clade: Commelinids
- Order: Arecales
- Family: Arecaceae
- Genus: Metroxylon
- Species: M. salomonense

Binomial name
- Metroxylon salomonense (Warb.) Becc.

= Metroxylon salomonense =

Species of plant

Metroxylon salomonense is a palm (family Arecaceae or Palmae) native to the Solomon Islands, Vanuatu and the Bismarck Archipelago. Common name bia.

It grows to 15 to 20 m in height in just twenty years, with a trunk diameter of 60–80 cm. The pinnate fronds can be over 6 m long, and have leaflets 100–190 cm long by 14–19 cm wide. It is monocarpic, dying after flowering and fruiting. The inflorescence is a panicle up to 9 m in height and half as wide.
