= Hispodonta cyperaceae =

Scientific classification
- Kingdom: Animalia
- Phylum: Arthropoda
- Class: Insecta
- Order: Coleoptera
- Suborder: Polyphaga
- Infraorder: Cucujiformia
- Family: Chrysomelidae
- Genus: Hispodonta
- Species: H. cyperaceae

Binomial name
- Hispodonta cyperaceae Gressitt, 1988

Species of beetle

Hispodonta cyperaceae is a species of beetle of the family Chrysomelidae. It is found in New Guinea.

== Description ==
Adults reach a length of about 7.8 mm. Adults are testaceous with the apical one-fourth of the elytron purplish pitchy.

== Biology ==
This species has been found feeding on an unidentified sedge species.
