= Hispodonta elegantula =

Scientific classification
- Kingdom: Animalia
- Phylum: Arthropoda
- Class: Insecta
- Order: Coleoptera
- Suborder: Polyphaga
- Infraorder: Cucujiformia
- Family: Chrysomelidae
- Genus: Hispodonta
- Species: H. elegantula

Binomial name
- Hispodonta elegantula Baly, 1869

Species of beetle

Hispodonta elegantula is a species of beetle of the family Chrysomelidae. It is found on the Moluccas (Ambon).

== Description ==
Adults reach a length of about 8–10.5 mm. Adults are black with a pale brown elytron with the apical one-fourth and two stripes black.
