= Hispodonta palmella =

Scientific classification
- Kingdom: Animalia
- Phylum: Arthropoda
- Class: Insecta
- Order: Coleoptera
- Suborder: Polyphaga
- Infraorder: Cucujiformia
- Family: Chrysomelidae
- Genus: Hispodonta
- Species: H. palmella

Binomial name
- Hispodonta palmella Gressitt, 1963

Synonyms
- Hispodonta subrotunda Gressitt, 1963

Species of beetle

Hispodonta palmella is a species of beetle of the family Chrysomelidae. It is found in New Guinea.

== Description ==
Adults reach a length of about 6.85–8.75 mm. Adults are red, with the elytron mostly bluish purple.

== Biology ==
This species has been found feeding on Calamus species.
