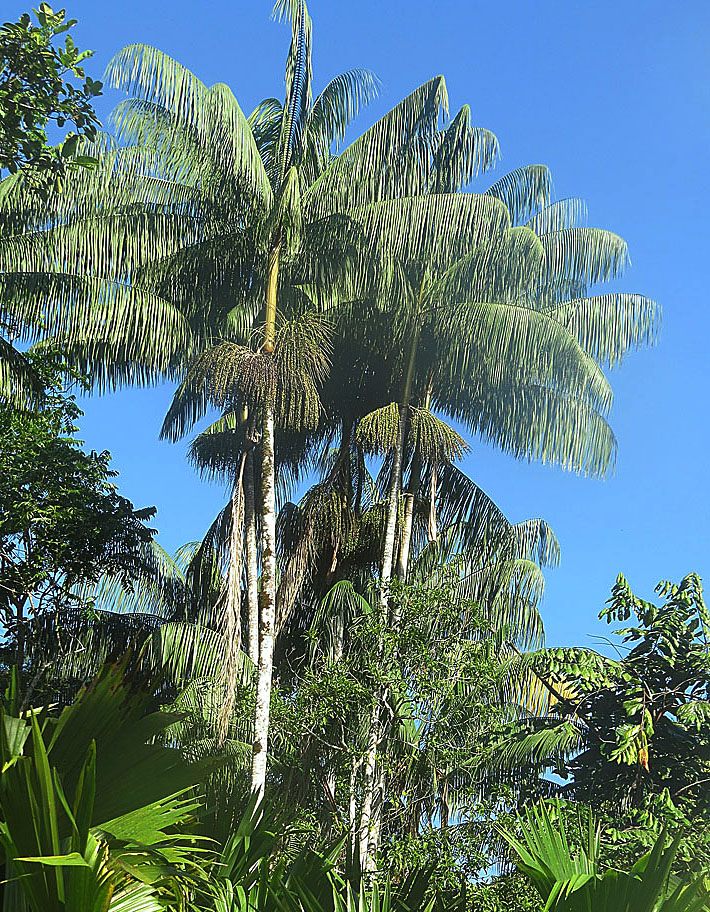

Conservation status
- Least Concern (IUCN 3.1)

Scientific classification
- Kingdom: Plantae
- Clade: Tracheophytes
- Clade: Angiosperms
- Clade: Monocots
- Clade: Commelinids
- Order: Arecales
- Family: Arecaceae
- Genus: Euterpe
- Species: E. precatoria

Binomial name
- Euterpe precatoria Mart.

= Euterpe precatoria =

Species of palm

Euterpe precatoria is a tall, slender-stemmed, pinnate-leaved palm native to Central and South America and Trinidad and Tobago. E. precatoria is used commercially to produce fruits, although Euterpe oleracea is more commonly cultivated due to its larger fruits.

== Biological description ==
Stems are usually solitary (occasionally clustered), 3–20 metres tall and 4–23 centimetres in diameter. It is also estimated to be the most common tree in the Amazonian region, though it accounts for just over 1% of all adult trees there (5 billion out of 390 billion). This census covered only the Amazon basin. There would be many additional individuals in the Orinoco Basin and in Central America.

== Uses ==
E. precatoria is a non-timber forest product that produces acai berries. As well as the edible fruits, this palm is a source of prized (though not very nutritious) hearts of palm. Since it is a single-stemmed palm, harvesting palm hearts kills the tree, and has led to a reduction in numbers. During the 1990s, the palm was heavily harvested for palmito in Peru and Bolivia, but production dropped in the early 2000s due to overharvesting. Today, prices in Peru are currently high since it is now uncommon in the wild.

== Varieties ==
Two varieties are recognised: E. precatoria var. precatoria which has tall, solitary stems and is found in Trinidad and throughout most of the South American portion of the range, and E. precatoria var. longivaginata (Mart.) A.J.Hend. which has shorter, solitary or clustered stems, and is found in Colombia and Central America.

== Etymology ==
Common names include mountain cabbage in Belize, açai, açaizeiro, açaí-do-amazonas or açaí-solitário in Brazil, asaí and palmiche in Colombia, wassaï in French Guiana, huasaí in Peru and manaca in Venezuela. The stems are used for construction, a beverage is made from the fruit, and the roots are used medicinally.

== Synonymy ==
Synonyms:

E. precatoria var. precatoria
Heterotypic synonyms

- Euterpe oleracea Engel, nom. illeg.
- Euterpe mollissima Spruce, nom. illeg.
- Euterpe jatapuensis Barb.Rodr.
- Euterpe stenophylla Trail ex Burret
- Euterpe langloisii Burret
- Euterpe petiolata Burret
- Euterpe subruminata Burret
- Euterpe confertiflora L.H.Bailey

E. precatoria var. longivaginata
Homotypic synonyms

- Euterpe longivaginata Mart.

Heterotypic synonyms

- Euterpe macrospadix Oerst.
- Euterpe karsteniana Engel
- Euterpe leucospadix H.Wendl. ex Hemsl.
- Plectis oweniana O.F.Cook
- Euterpe kalbreyeri Burret
- Euterpe microcarpa Burret
- Euterpe panamensis Burret
- Rooseveltia frankliniana O.F.Cook
- Euterpe rhodoxyla Dugand
