= Hispodonta bicolor =

Scientific classification
- Kingdom: Animalia
- Phylum: Arthropoda
- Clade: Pancrustacea
- Class: Insecta
- Order: Coleoptera
- Suborder: Polyphaga
- Infraorder: Cucujiformia
- Family: Chrysomelidae
- Genus: Hispodonta
- Species: H. bicolor

Binomial name
- Hispodonta bicolor Gressitt, 1963

Species of beetle

Hispodonta bicolor is a species of beetle of the family Chrysomelidae. It is found in New Guinea.

== Description ==
Adults reach a length of about 11.7-12.2 mm. Adults are pale orange-red, while the apical two-fifths of the elytron is purplish blue.

== Biology ==
This species has been found feeding on large-leafed ginger.
