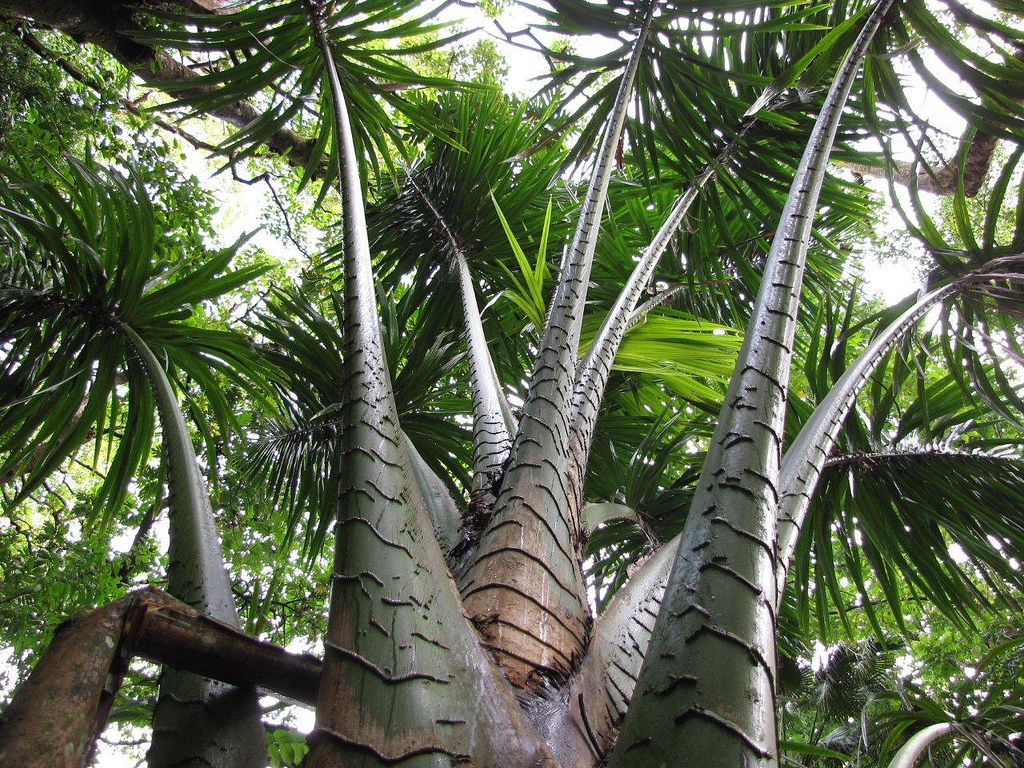
- At Keʻanae Arboretum

Conservation status
- Near Threatened (IUCN 3.1)

Scientific classification
- Kingdom: Plantae
- Clade: Tracheophytes
- Clade: Angiosperms
- Clade: Monocots
- Clade: Commelinids
- Order: Arecales
- Family: Arecaceae
- Genus: Metroxylon
- Species: M. amicarum

Binomial name
- Metroxylon amicarum H.Wendl.) Becc.

= Metroxylon amicarum =

Species of palm

Metroxylon amicarum (amicarium Latin – 'of friends' also known as the Caroline ivory-nut palm) is a species of flowering plant in the family Arecaceae, endemic to the Caroline Islands. It was named for the Friendly Islands, now Tonga, from where it was first thought to have descended. It is the only species in the Metroxylon genus which is not hapaxanthic.

== Description ==
Usually growing to 20 metres (66 ft), but occasionally over 25 m (82 ft), these massive palms have solitary trunks with widely spaced leaf-scar rings and old leaf bases attached to the top. Leaves are pinnately arranged, 5 m (16 ft) long, on 1-metre (3 ft 3 in) petioles. The lanceolate leaflets are dark green to 1 m (3 ft 3 in) and occur on the rachis at varying angles, creating a plumose leaf. Unlike its monocarpic relatives, this species has a narrow inflorescence which develops within the leaf-bases; the stem is erect until the fruit matures and then sags to a pendent cluster. The single-seeded fruit are 9 centimetres (3.5 in) long, extremely hard, and are covered in brown, glossy scales. Of all species in the genus it is probably the most hardy to cold. It is found only in the Federated States of Micronesia. It is threatened by habitat destruction.
