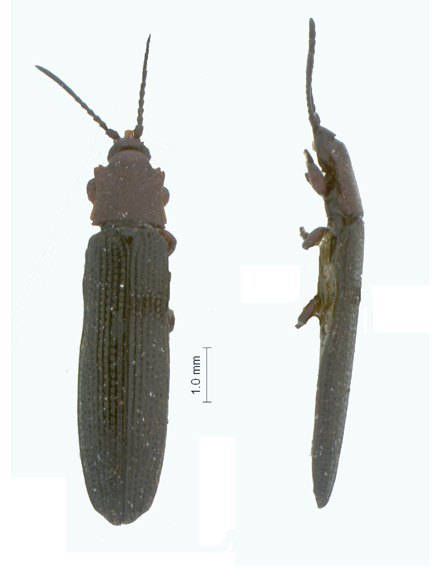

Scientific classification
- Kingdom: Animalia
- Phylum: Arthropoda
- Clade: Pancrustacea
- Class: Insecta
- Order: Coleoptera
- Suborder: Polyphaga
- Infraorder: Cucujiformia
- Family: Chrysomelidae
- Genus: Octodonta
- Species: O. surigaoana

Binomial name
- Octodonta surigaoana (Uhmann, 1933)

Synonyms
- Bronthispa surigaoana Uhmann, 1933

= Octodonta surigaoana =

Species of beetle

Octodonta surigaoana is a species of beetle of the family Chrysomelidae. It is found in the Philippines (Mindanao).

== Life history ==
The recorded host plant for this species is Cocos nucifera.

== Taxonomy ==
The species was described as Bronthispa surigaoana by Erich Uhmann in 1933 in the article Neues uber philippinische Hispinen. 40. Beitrag zur Kenntnis der Hispinen, which was published in the journal Folia Zoologica et Hydrobiologica.
