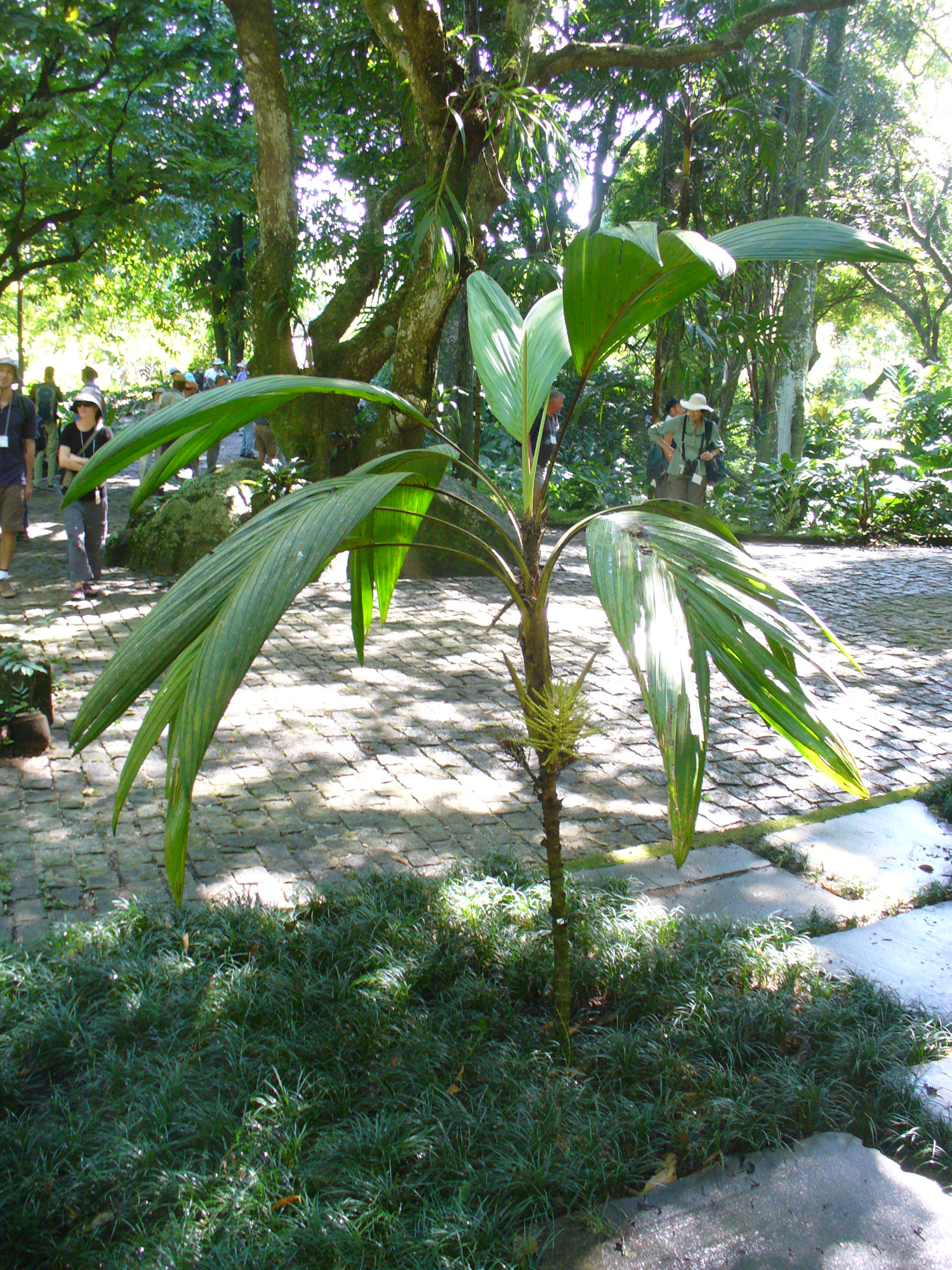

Conservation status
- Vulnerable (IUCN 2.3)

Scientific classification
- Kingdom: Plantae
- Clade: Tracheophytes
- Clade: Angiosperms
- Clade: Monocots
- Clade: Commelinids
- Order: Arecales
- Family: Arecaceae
- Genus: Euterpe
- Species: E. luminosa

Binomial name
- Euterpe luminosa Henderson, Galeano & Meza

= Euterpe luminosa =

Species of plant

Euterpe luminosa is a species of flowering plant in the family Arecaceae. It is found only in Pasco Province of Peru. It is threatened by habitat loss.

== Description ==
=== Stems ===
This species typically grows in clusters, though a single stem usually dominates while others remain as basal offshoots. The stem is upright, reaching 5–11 meters in height and 5–7 cm in diameter, with a grayish surface.

=== Leaves ===
The crown comprises 9–12 arching leaves. The sheath, measuring 48–65 cm, is green and covered with a moderate layer of reddish-brown woolly hairs near the top. The petiole, 20–35 cm long, transitions from reddish in young plants to green in maturity and is densely coated with fine reddish-brown hairs. The rachis, extending 1.1–1.4 meters, has similar hair coverage. Each rachis bears 48–69 leaflets per side, arranged in a slightly drooping manner. The leaflets are glabrous, with a pronounced midvein and two lateral veins.

- Basal leaflets: 20–25 cm long, 0.1–0.2 cm wide
- Middle leaflets: 35–41 cm long, 0.6–1 cm wide
- Terminal leaflet: 14–15 cm long, 0.5 cm wide

=== Inflorescence ===
The inflorescence emerges beneath the leaves and stands erect during bloom. The peduncle, around 4–5 cm long and 1 cm thick, supports the prophyll, which is 32 cm long and 3 cm wide, smooth, and papery. The main bract, also 32 cm long, tapers to 2 cm in width and lacks an umbo. Smaller bracts, up to 4 cm long, may also be present. The rachis extends 13–16 cm and bears 30–40 branchlets, each reaching 30 cm long and 2 mm thick, with a light to dense covering of fine, reddish-brown, star-shaped hairs.

=== Flowers ===
Flowers are arranged in triads toward the base, while higher sections contain single or paired staminate flowers. Some inflorescences are predominantly male.

- Male flowers: 6–7 mm long, with triangular petals (5 mm long) and small, triangular sepals (2.5 mm long, joined at the base). Filaments measure 1.5 mm, with anthers reaching 3 mm. A vestigial ovary is present.
- Female flowers: Smaller, up to 2.5 mm long, with round petals and sepals (each 2 mm long) and six small sterile stamens.

=== Fruit ===
The fruit is oval, 2 cm long and 1 cm across, with a persistent stigma scar near the tip. The outer layer darkens to black upon ripening, enclosing an ellipsoid seed with uniform endosperm and a central air cavity. The seedling's first leaf is pinnate with an elongated axis.
