= Hispodonta feliciae =

Scientific classification
- Kingdom: Animalia
- Phylum: Arthropoda
- Class: Insecta
- Order: Coleoptera
- Suborder: Polyphaga
- Infraorder: Cucujiformia
- Family: Chrysomelidae
- Genus: Hispodonta
- Species: H. feliciae

Binomial name
- Hispodonta feliciae Samuelson, 1988

Species of beetle

Hispodonta feliciae is a species of beetle of the family Chrysomelidae. It is found in New Guinea.

== Description ==
Adults reach a length of about 9.45 mm. They have an orange-ochraceous head, while the elytron is blackish purple, with a pale lateral margin and apex.
