= Hispodonta semipallida =

Scientific classification
- Kingdom: Animalia
- Phylum: Arthropoda
- Class: Insecta
- Order: Coleoptera
- Suborder: Polyphaga
- Infraorder: Cucujiformia
- Family: Chrysomelidae
- Genus: Hispodonta
- Species: H. semipallida

Binomial name
- Hispodonta semipallida Gressitt, 1988

Species of beetle

Hispodonta semipallida is a species of beetle of the family Chrysomelidae. It is found in New Guinea.

== Description ==
Adults reach a length of about 9.4–10.1 mm. Adults are reddish ochraceous, but the posterior three-fourth of the elytral disc is purplish blue.
