= Hispodonta nitida =

Scientific classification
- Kingdom: Animalia
- Phylum: Arthropoda
- Class: Insecta
- Order: Coleoptera
- Suborder: Polyphaga
- Infraorder: Cucujiformia
- Family: Chrysomelidae
- Genus: Hispodonta
- Species: H. nitida

Binomial name
- Hispodonta nitida Gressitt, 1988

Species of beetle

Hispodonta nitida is a species of beetle of the family Chrysomelidae. It is found in New Guinea.

== Description ==
Adults reach a length of about 11.7 mm. Adults are black, with the basal three-fourth of the elytron is reddish ochraceous.

== Biology ==
It has been recorded feeding on a Heterospathe-like species.
