= Hispodonta semperi =

Scientific classification
- Kingdom: Animalia
- Phylum: Arthropoda
- Class: Insecta
- Order: Coleoptera
- Suborder: Polyphaga
- Infraorder: Cucujiformia
- Family: Chrysomelidae
- Genus: Hispodonta
- Species: H. semperi

Binomial name
- Hispodonta semperi Chapuis, 1876

Species of beetle

Hispodonta semperi is a species of beetle of the family Chrysomelidae. It is found in the Philippines (Luzon).
