= Hispodonta imperialis =

Scientific classification
- Kingdom: Animalia
- Phylum: Arthropoda
- Clade: Pancrustacea
- Class: Insecta
- Order: Coleoptera
- Suborder: Polyphaga
- Infraorder: Cucujiformia
- Family: Chrysomelidae
- Genus: Hispodonta
- Species: H. imperialis

Binomial name
- Hispodonta imperialis (Baly, 1859)

Synonyms
- Oxycephala imperalis Baly, 1859; Spilispa balyi Chapuis, 1875

Species of beetle

Hispodonta imperialis is a species of beetle of the family Chrysomelidae. It is found in Indonesia (Sulawesi), the Moluccas and New Guinea.

== Description ==
Adults reach a length of about 12–14 mm. Adults are orange-testaceous, the elytron with broad steel blue basal and postmedian areas.
