= Hispodonta delkeskampi =

Scientific classification
- Kingdom: Animalia
- Phylum: Arthropoda
- Class: Insecta
- Order: Coleoptera
- Suborder: Polyphaga
- Infraorder: Cucujiformia
- Family: Chrysomelidae
- Genus: Hispodonta
- Species: H. delkeskampi

Binomial name
- Hispodonta delkeskampi Uhmann, 1952

Species of beetle

Hispodonta delkeskampi is a species of beetle of the family Chrysomelidae. It is found in New Guinea.

== Description ==
Adults reach a length of about 12 mm. Adults are black with a testaceous elytron. The elytron has a single sutural row of punctures.
