= Hispodonta janthina =

Scientific classification
- Kingdom: Animalia
- Phylum: Arthropoda
- Clade: Pancrustacea
- Class: Insecta
- Order: Coleoptera
- Suborder: Polyphaga
- Infraorder: Cucujiformia
- Family: Chrysomelidae
- Genus: Hispodonta
- Species: H. janthina

Binomial name
- Hispodonta janthina (Blanchard, 1853)

Synonyms
- Cephaloleia janthina Blanchard, 1853; Hispodonta unicolor Heller, 1916

Species of beetle

Hispodonta janthina is a species of beetle of the family Chrysomelidae. It is found in Indonesia (Sulawesi) and New Guinea.

== Biology ==
This species has been found feeding on Musa species.
