= Octodonta korthalsiae =

Scientific classification
- Kingdom: Animalia
- Phylum: Arthropoda
- Clade: Pancrustacea
- Class: Insecta
- Order: Coleoptera
- Suborder: Polyphaga
- Infraorder: Cucujiformia
- Family: Chrysomelidae
- Genus: Octodonta
- Species: O. korthalsiae

Binomial name
- Octodonta korthalsiae Gressitt, 1960

Species of beetle

Octodonta korthalsiae is a species of beetle of the family Chrysomelidae. It is found in north-eastern New Guinea.

== Description ==
Adults reach a length of about 7.1 mm. They are pale chestnut brown, but pitchy black on the distal two-fifths of antennae and brownish ochraceous on the abdomen.

== Life history ==
The recorded host plants for this species are Korthalsia beccarii.
