= Hispodonta bifasciata =

Scientific classification
- Kingdom: Animalia
- Phylum: Arthropoda
- Class: Insecta
- Order: Coleoptera
- Suborder: Polyphaga
- Infraorder: Cucujiformia
- Family: Chrysomelidae
- Genus: Hispodonta
- Species: H. bifasciata

Binomial name
- Hispodonta bifasciata Gestro, 1906

Species of beetle

Hispodonta bifasciata is a species of beetle of the family Chrysomelidae. It is found on the Moluccas.

== Description ==
Adults reach a length of about 9.5 mm. Adults are pale brown, the elytron with blue bands.
