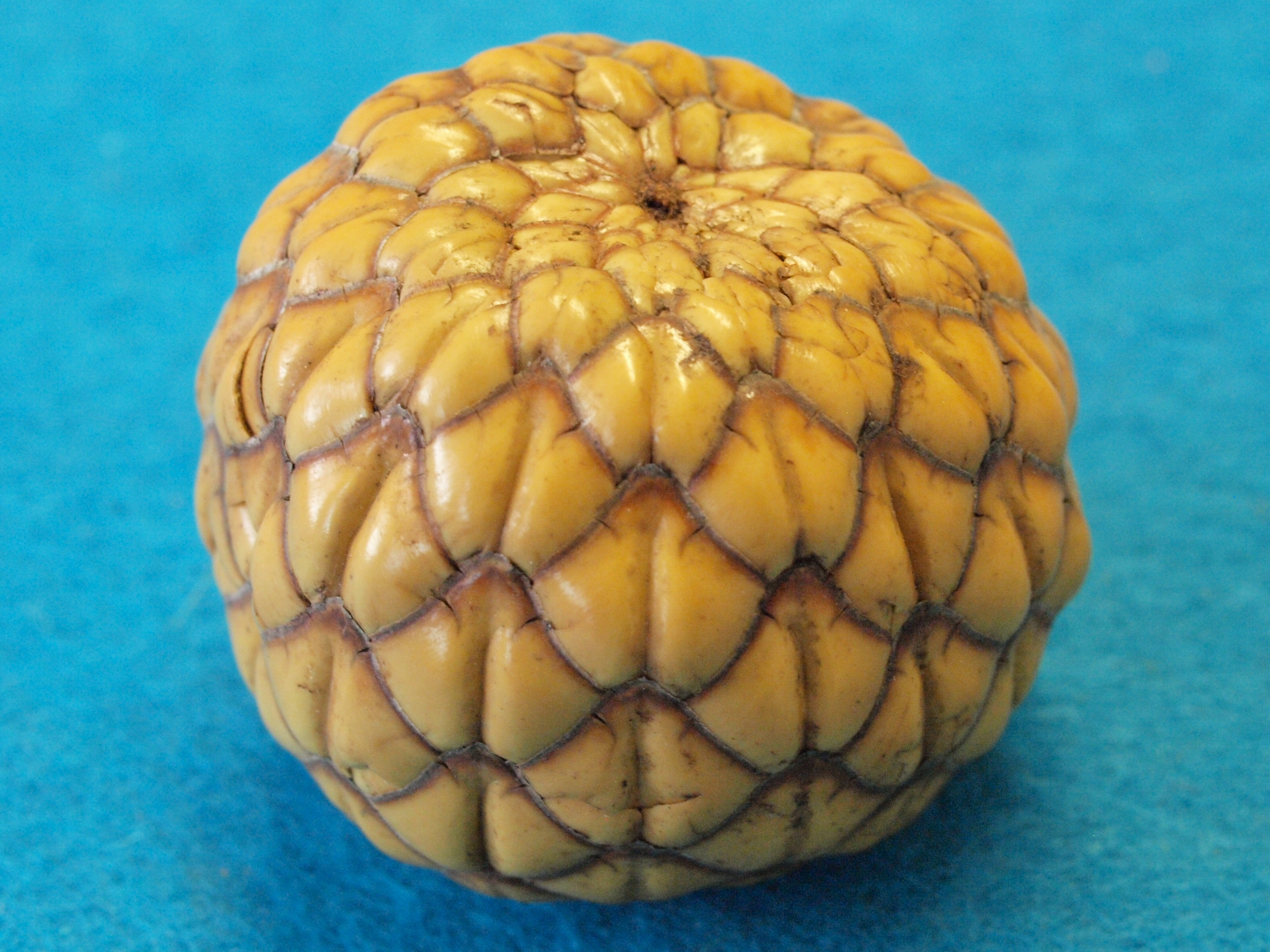
- Metroxylon warburgii fruit

Conservation status
- Least Concern (IUCN 2.3)

Scientific classification
- Kingdom: Plantae
- Clade: Tracheophytes
- Clade: Angiosperms
- Clade: Monocots
- Clade: Commelinids
- Order: Arecales
- Family: Arecaceae
- Genus: Metroxylon
- Species: M. warburgii

Binomial name
- Metroxylon warburgii (Heimerl) Becc.

Varieties
- M. w. var tutuileansis

Synonyms
- Coelococcus warburgii Heimerl

= Metroxylon warburgii =

Species of palm

Metroxylon warburgii, commonly called the natangura palm, is a species of flowering plant in the family Arecaceae. The specific epithet is in honor of Otto Warburg. The common name is from the Bislama name natanggura.

== Habitat ==
It is found in Solomon Islands and Vanuatu. It can be found in lowland, swampy areas and the floodplains of Vanuatu, New Hebrides, and Samoa. It thrives in sunny, hot environments with a lot of water, and cannot live in the cold.

== Growth ==
It is a medium-large solitary palm tree that can grow up to about 10m tall. It has spiny leaf bases and leaves that slight bend backward. The plant reaches maturity around eight years old, and is also monocarpic, which means that it can only flower once before it dies.

== Uses ==
It is widely used as a material for thatching houses. The seeds are also used as vegetable ivory, and in French they are called noix d'ivoire (literally: "ivory nuts").
