= Euterpe catinga =

Scientific classification
- Kingdom: Plantae
- Clade: Tracheophytes
- Clade: Angiosperms
- Clade: Monocots
- Clade: Commelinids
- Order: Arecales
- Family: Arecaceae
- Genus: Euterpe
- Species: E. catinga

Binomial name
- Euterpe catinga Wallace

Synonyms
- Euterpe mollissima Barb. Rodr.; Euterpe catinga var. aurantiaca Drude; Euterpe caatinga Spruce; Euterpe mollissima Spruce; Euterpe controversa Barb. Rodr.; Euterpe aurantiaca H.E.Moore; Euterpe concinna Burret; Euterpe roraimae Dammer; Euterpe montis-duida Burret; Euterpe ptariana Steyerm.; Euterpe erubescens H.E.Moore

Species of palm

Euterpe catinga is a palm species in the genus Euterpe. It is found in forests of a dry, sandy soil and very peculiar vegetation, known as catinga forests or Campinarana in northern South America (Guyana, Venezuela, Colombia, Ecuador, Peru, Brazil).

Two varieties are recognized:

1. Euterpe catinga var. catinga - Venezuela, Colombia, Peru, northern Brazil
2. Euterpe catinga var. roraimae (Dammer) A.J.Hend. & Galeano - Guyana, Venezuela, Ecuador, Peru, Brazil
