= Hispodonta chapuisii =

Scientific classification
- Kingdom: Animalia
- Phylum: Arthropoda
- Class: Insecta
- Order: Coleoptera
- Suborder: Polyphaga
- Infraorder: Cucujiformia
- Family: Chrysomelidae
- Genus: Hispodonta
- Species: H. chapuisii

Binomial name
- Hispodonta chapuisii Gestro, 1885

Species of beetle

Hispodonta chapuisii is a species of beetle of the family Chrysomelidae. It is found in New Guinea.

== Description ==
Adults reach a length of about 6.75–9.9 mm. Adults are red, with the posterior two-fifth of elytral disc purplish to blackish.

== Biology ==
This species has been found feeding on Areca species and possibly also feeds on Pinanga and Heterospathe species.
