= Hispodonta depressa =

Scientific classification
- Kingdom: Animalia
- Phylum: Arthropoda
- Class: Insecta
- Order: Coleoptera
- Suborder: Polyphaga
- Infraorder: Cucujiformia
- Family: Chrysomelidae
- Genus: Hispodonta
- Species: H. depressa

Binomial name
- Hispodonta depressa Gestro, 1905

Species of beetle

Hispodonta depressa is a species of beetle of the family Chrysomelidae. It is found in New Guinea.

== Description ==
Adults reach a length of about 11.25 mm. Adults are brown, with the antennae black and the apex of the elytron blackish blue.
