= Hispodonta =

Scientific classification
- Kingdom: Animalia
- Phylum: Arthropoda
- Class: Insecta
- Order: Coleoptera
- Suborder: Polyphaga
- Infraorder: Cucujiformia
- Family: Chrysomelidae
- Subfamily: Cassidinae
- Tribe: Callispini
- Genus: Hispodonta; Baly, 1858

Synonyms
- Spilispa Chapuis, 1875

Genus of leaf beetles

Hispodonta is a genus of beetles belonging to the family Chrysomelidae.

== Species ==
- Hispodonta bicolor Gressitt, 1963
- Hispodonta bifasciata Gestro, 1906
- Hispodonta chapuisii Gestro, 1885
- Hispodonta cyperaceae Gressitt, 1988
- Hispodonta delkeskampi Uhmann, 1952
- Hispodonta depressa Gestro, 1905
- Hispodonta discalis Gressitt, 1957
- Hispodonta elegantula Baly, 1869
- Hispodonta feliciae Samuelson, 1988
- Hispodonta forticornis Heller, 1916
- Hispodonta grandis Gressitt, 1963
- Hispodonta imperialis (Baly, 1859)
- Hispodonta janthina (Blanchard, 1853)
- Hispodonta loriae Gestro, 1913
- Hispodonta metroxylona Gressitt, 1960
- Hispodonta nigricornis Baly, 1858
- Hispodonta nitida Gressitt, 1988
- Hispodonta palmella Gressitt, 1963
- Hispodonta palmicola Gressitt, 1960
- Hispodonta plagiata Baly, 1887
- Hispodonta sacsac Gressitt, 1963
- Hispodonta samarica Uhmann, 1930
- Hispodonta sagu Gressitt, 1963
- Hispodonta semperi Chapuis, 1876
- Hispodonta semipallida Gressitt, 1988
- Hispodonta tarsata Chapuis, 1876
- Hispodonta vicina Gressitt, 1963
