= Hispodonta grandis =

Scientific classification
- Kingdom: Animalia
- Phylum: Arthropoda
- Class: Insecta
- Order: Coleoptera
- Suborder: Polyphaga
- Infraorder: Cucujiformia
- Family: Chrysomelidae
- Genus: Hispodonta
- Species: H. grandis

Binomial name
- Hispodonta grandis Gressitt, 1963

Species of beetle

Hispodonta grandis is a species of beetle of the family Chrysomelidae. It is found in New Guinea.

== Description ==
Adults reach a length of about 11.9–13.5 mm. Adults are black with a pale orange-brown elytron with dense punctures near the scutellum.
