= Octodonta angulosa =

Scientific classification
- Kingdom: Animalia
- Phylum: Arthropoda
- Clade: Pancrustacea
- Class: Insecta
- Order: Coleoptera
- Suborder: Polyphaga
- Infraorder: Cucujiformia
- Family: Chrysomelidae
- Genus: Octodonta
- Species: O. angulosa

Binomial name
- Octodonta angulosa (Uhmann, 1930)

Synonyms
- Bronthispa angulosa Uhmann, 1930

Species of beetle

Octodonta angulosa is a species of beetle of the family Chrysomelidae. It is found in the Philippines (Luzon, Mindanao, Mindoro).

== Life history ==
The recorded host plants for this species are Cocos nucifera and Corypha elata.
