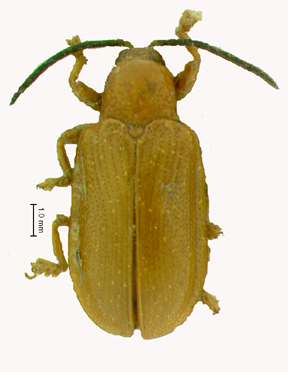

Scientific classification
- Kingdom: Animalia
- Phylum: Arthropoda
- Class: Insecta
- Order: Coleoptera
- Suborder: Polyphaga
- Infraorder: Cucujiformia
- Family: Chrysomelidae
- Genus: Hispodonta
- Species: H. samarica

Binomial name
- Hispodonta samarica Uhmann, 1930

= Hispodonta samarica =

Species of beetle

Hispodonta samarica is a species of beetle of the family Chrysomelidae. It is found in the Philippines (Luzon, Samar).
