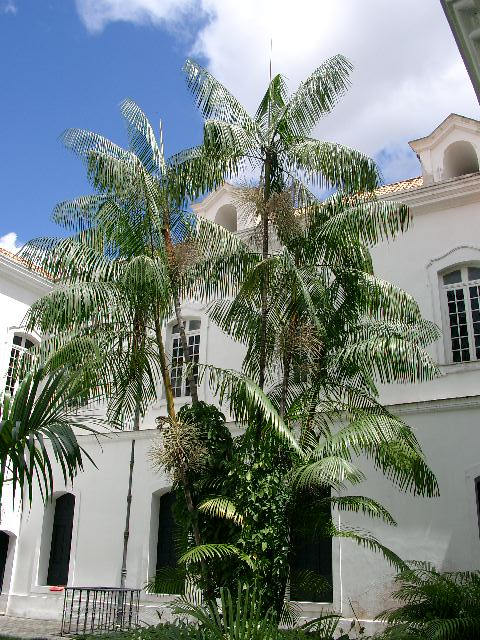
- Euterpe oleracea

Scientific classification
- Kingdom: Plantae
- Clade: Tracheophytes
- Clade: Angiosperms
- Clade: Monocots
- Clade: Commelinids
- Order: Arecales
- Family: Arecaceae
- Subfamily: Arecoideae
- Tribe: Euterpeae
- Genus: Euterpe; Mart.

Type species
- Euterpe oleracea

Synonyms
- Catis O.F.Cook; Plectis O.F.Cook; Rooseveltia O.F.Cook

= Euterpe (plant) =

Genus of palms

Euterpe is a genus of palm trees, containing eight species that are native to Central America and the Yucatan, the West Indies, and South America, from Belize and the Windward Islands southward to Brazil, Peru and Argentina. These palms grow mainly in swamps and floodplains.

The genus is named after the muse Euterpe of Greek mythology. Euterpe are tall, slender palms growing to 15–30 metres (49–98 ft), with pinnate leaves up to 3 metres (9.8 ft) long, and a stem only about 100 millimetres (3.9 in) in diameter. Many of the palms that were once in the genus Euterpe have been reclassified into the genus Prestoea.

The fruit is small, but is produced in great quantity upon branched spadices, which are thrown out horizontally beneath the crown of leaves. It consists of a hard seed, with a very thin covering of a firm pulp or flesh.

The name açaí palm usually refers to Euterpe oleracea, but various other species of Euterpe are cultivated commercially under that name.

== Uses ==
A beverage called açaí, much used at Pará and other places on the Amazon River, is prepared from the fruit of certain species. Warm water is poured upon the fruit, and by rubbing and kneading, a liquid is procured, consisting simply of the pulp of the fruit and water. It is a thick, creamy liquid, of a purplish color, and a flavor like that of a freshly gathered nut. It is commonly used with bread made from manioc, and either with or without sugar.

The stem of the açaí palm is sometimes used for poles and rafters, and its terminal bud as a cabbage or as a salad with, oil and vinegar.

== Species ==
Accepted species:

| Image | Scientific name | Distribution |
|---|---|---|
| | Euterpe broadwayi Becc. ex Broadway | Windward Islands, Trinidad & Tobago |
| | Euterpe catinga Wallace | Guyana, Venezuela, Colombia, Peru, Brazil |
| | Euterpe edulis Mart | Brazil, Paraguay, Misiones Province of Argentina |
| | Euterpe longibracteata Barb.Rodr. | Guyana, Venezuela, Brazil |
| | Euterpe luminosa A.J.Hend., Galeano & Meza | Pasco Province of Peru |
| | Euterpe oleracea Mart. | Trinidad & Tobago, the Guianas, Venezuela, Colombia, Brazil, Ecuador |
| | Euterpe precatoria Mart. | widespread across much of Central America, South America, and Trinidad |
