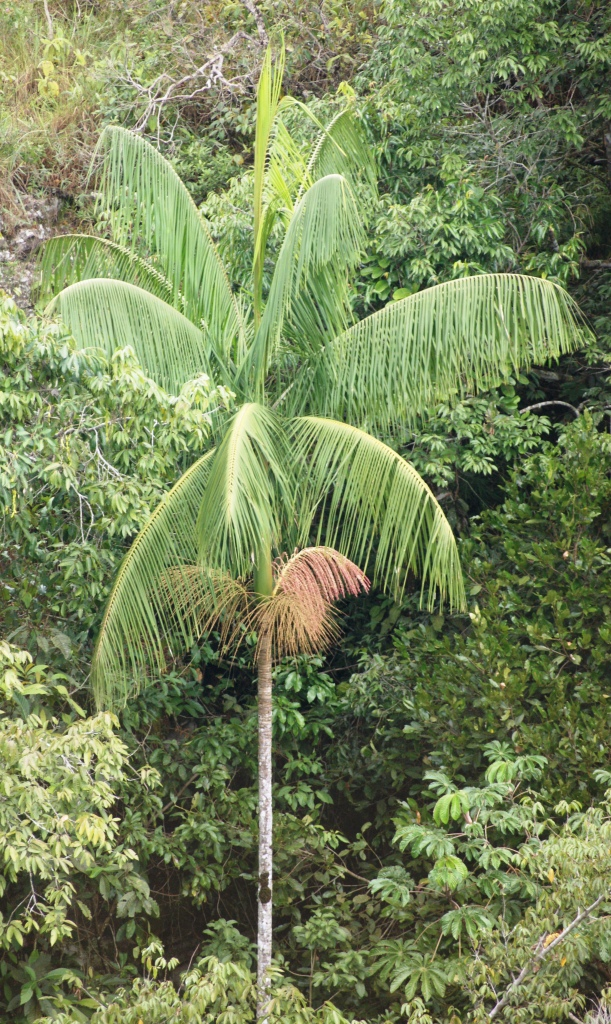

Scientific classification
- Kingdom: Plantae
- Clade: Tracheophytes
- Clade: Angiosperms
- Clade: Monocots
- Clade: Commelinids
- Order: Arecales
- Family: Arecaceae
- Genus: Euterpe
- Species: E. edulis

Binomial name
- Euterpe edulis Mart.

= Euterpe edulis =

Species of palm

Euterpe edulis, commonly known as juçara, jussara (an archaic alternative spelling), açaí-do-sul or palmiteiro, is a palm species in the genus Euterpe. It is now predominantly used for hearts of palm. It is closely related to the açaí palm (Euterpe oleracea), a species cultivated for its fruit and superior hearts of palm. The larvae of Caligo brasiliensis are reported to feed on E. edulis.

Although it was formerly widely harvested in Brazil for hearts of palm, it is now uncommon in the wild and no longer harvested commercially due to past overharvesting. This could cause it to fall extinct.
