= Anton Heimerl =

Austrian botanist

Anton Heimerl (15 February 1857, Budapest - 4 March 1943, Wien) was an Austrian botanist.

Heimerl specialized in research of the plant family Nyctaginaceae, and was the binomial authority of many botanical species. He was author of the sections on Nyctaginaceae, Phytolaccaceae and Achatocarpaceae in Engler & Prantl's "Die Natürlichen Pflanzenfamilien" (Volume 16, 1934).

In 1903 the genus Heimerlia was named after him by Franz Xaver Rudolf von Höhnel, and in 1941 Carl Skottsberg named the genus Heimerliodendron in his honor.

== Selected writings ==
  - In English:
- "Two new species of Abronia", 1910
- "Nyctaginaceae of southeastern Polynesia and other Pacific islands", 1937
  - In German:
- Die niederösterreichischen Ascoboleen, 1889
- Monographie der Nyctaginaceen. I. Bougainvillea, Phaeoptilum, Colignonia, 1900
- Flora von Brixen a. E.., 1911
- Schulflora fur Österreich und die angrenzenden Gebiete der Alpen- und Sudetenländer sowie des Küstenland südlich bis Triest, 1923.
