= Heart of palm =

Stem vegetable

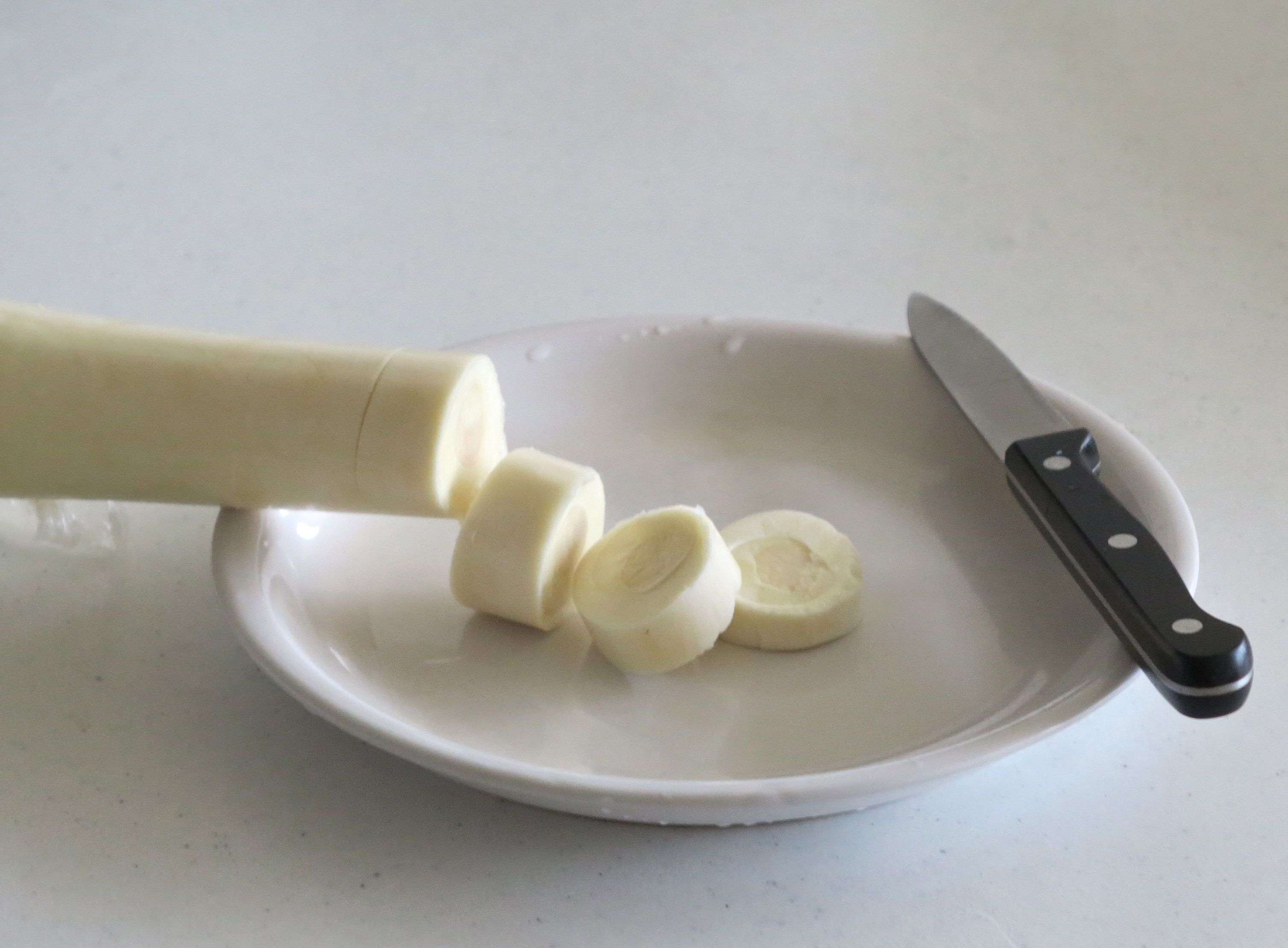
Fresh heart of palm

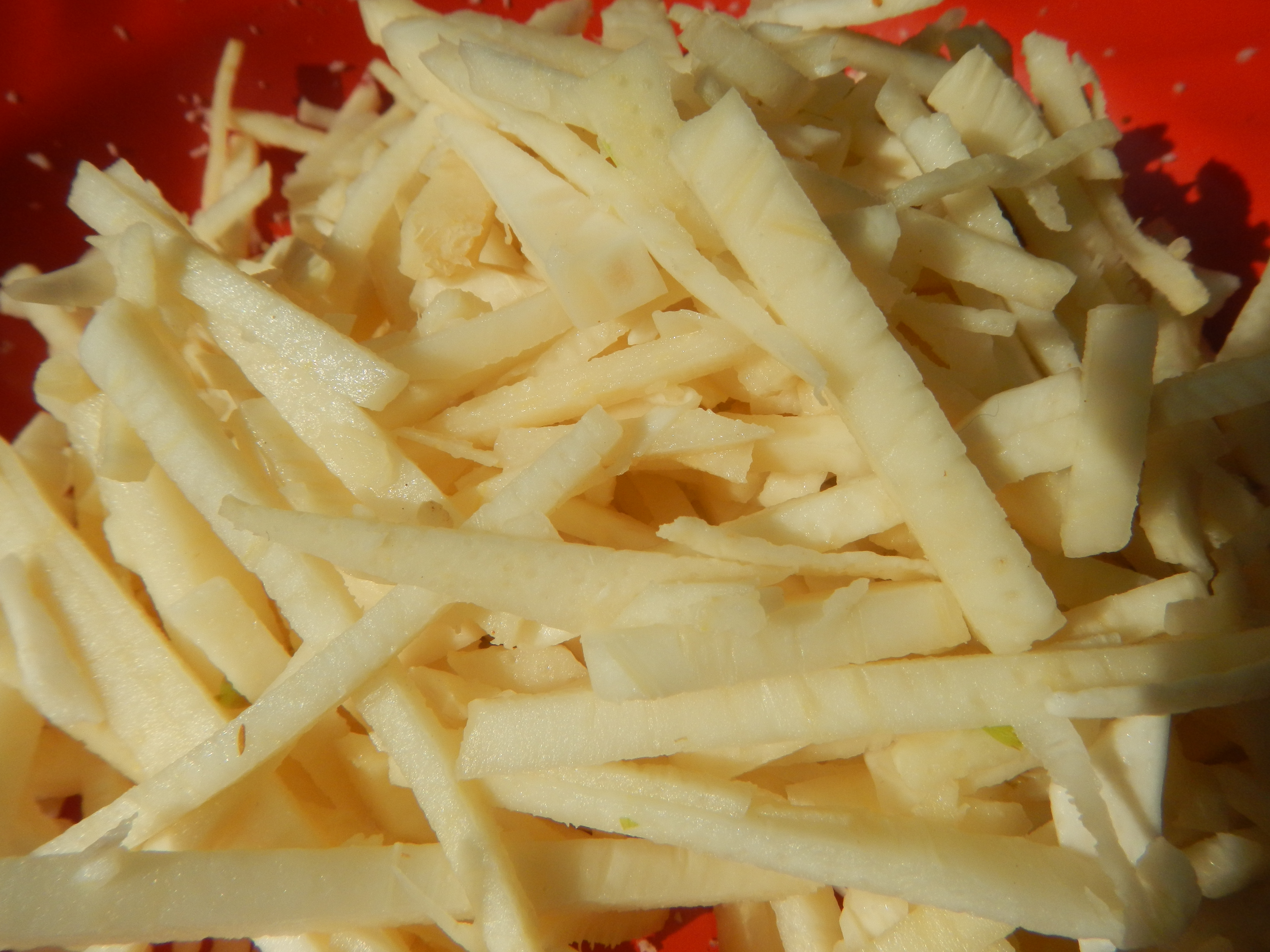
Julienned ubod (coconut heart) from the Philippines

Heart of palm is a vegetable harvested from the inner core and growing bud of certain palm trees, most notably the coconut (Cocos nucifera), juçara (Euterpe edulis), açaí palm (Euterpe oleracea), palmetto (Sabal spp.), and peach palm. Heart of palm may be eaten on its own, and often it is eaten in a salad. Hearts of palm are traditionally harvested in the cultures of Southeast Asia and in South and Central America.

== Names ==
Major local names for heart of palm include:

- palm cabbage or palmetto (Florida and Trinidad)
- palmito (South and Central America)
- ubod (in the Philippines) and umbut (Borneo, Malay Peninsula)
- củ hủ dừa in Vietnam;
- Latinates cœur de palmier (in French); corazón de palma or col de palma (in Spanish); coração de palma (Portuguese) and cuore di palma (in Italian).

== Nutrition ==
Heart of Palm
Nutritional value per 100 g (3.5 oz)
- Energy: 79.5 kJ (19.0 kcal)
- Carbohydrates: 3.1 g
- Sugars: 0.0 g
- Dietary fiber: 1.6 g
- Fat: 0.39 g
- Protein: 1.55 g
Vitamins and minerals
| Vitamins | Quantity %DV^{†} |
| Vitamin A equiv. | 3% 23.4 μg |
| Vitamin C | 2% 1.9 mg |
| Minerals | Quantity %DV^{†} |
| Calcium | 4% 47 mg |
| Iron | 12% 2.09 mg |
| Sodium | 15% 349 mg |
- Link to USDA Database entry
- ^{†}Percentages estimated using US recommendations for adults.

Hearts of palm are rich in fiber, potassium, iron, zinc, phosphorus, copper, vitamins B2, B6, and C. They are ranked as a "good" source of protein, riboflavin, and potassium, and as a "very good source" of dietary fiber, vitamin C, folate, calcium, iron, magnesium, phosphorus, zinc, copper, and especially, manganese, along with being a good ratio between omega-3 and omega-6 fatty acids. The high sodium content noted on the chart for hearts of palm relates to the canned product; it is not present in the fresh product.

== Cultivation ==
Harvesting and eating heart of palm is traditional in the cultures of Southeast Asia and South and Central America, pre-dating the colonial era. The species used depend on the region.

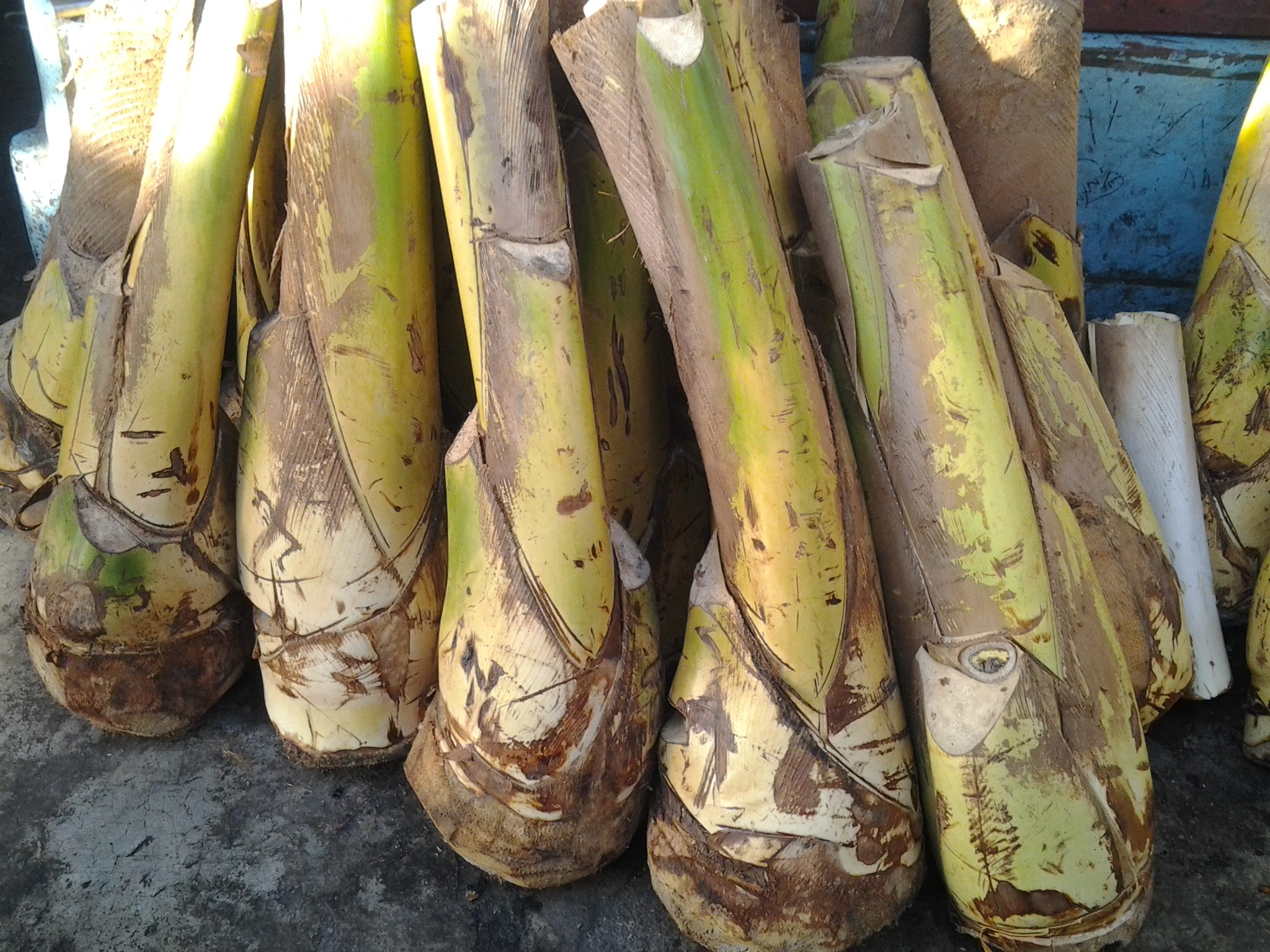
Ubod (coconut heart) sold in the Philippines

In Southeast Asia, the dominant source of hearts of palm are coconuts (Cocos nucifera). Other palms species used include rattans (Calamus spp.), fishtail palms (Caryota spp.), areca palm (Areca catechu), Linospadix spp., Arenga spp., sago palms (Metroxylon sagu), and buri palms (Corypha spp.), among others.

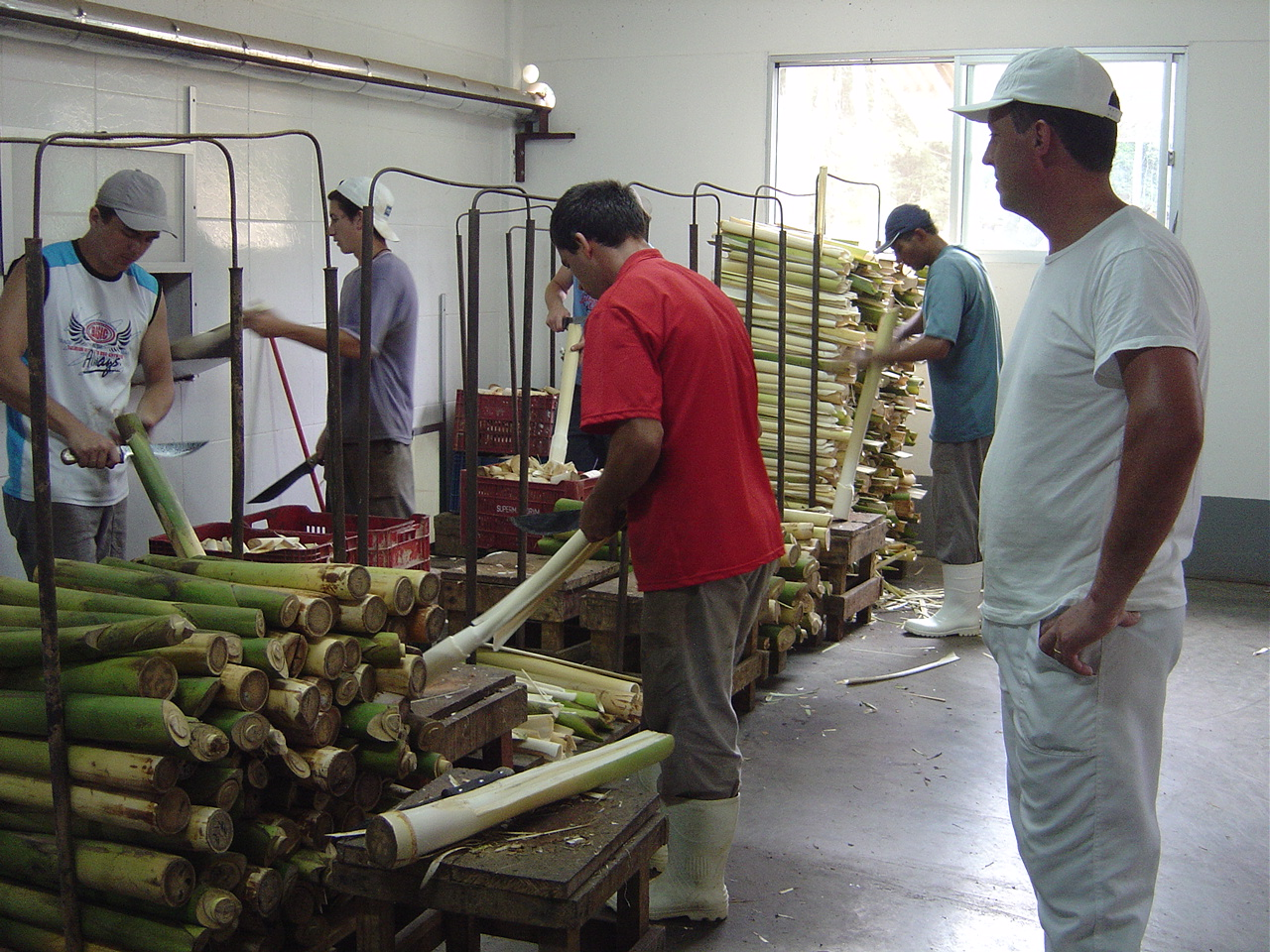
Heart of palm being prepared in Brazil for sale

In Central and South America, the dominant species used are juçara palms (Euterpe edulis), açaí palms (Euterpe oleracea), and pejibaye palms (Bactris spp.). Other species used include sabal palmettos (Sabal spp.), grugru palms (Acrocomia aculeata), royal palms (Roystonea spp.), Astrocaryum spp., maripa palms (Attalea maripa), urucuri palms (Attalea phalerata), cohune palms (Attalea cohune), hesper palms (Brahea spp.), and Syagrus spp., among others. In South America, Euterpe precatoria (in Peru and Bolivia), Euterpe edulis (in Brazil), and Prestoea acuminata (in Ecuador) were formerly harvested commercially on a large scale, but currently not any longer due to overharvesting. A 2000 case study in the journal Biotropica proposed that Euterpe edulis could be sustainably grown and harvested. Today, commercially available palmito in South America is typically derived from wild Euterpe oleracea and cultivated Bactris gasipaes.

Cultivation has also spread to South Asia, Africa, and other parts of the world, utilizing native palms like Ravenea madagascariensis, Phoenix canariensis, Lodoicea maldivica, and Borassus aethiopum, among others. Based on a 1987 article, peach palms were previously shown to have stretched out from Bolivia to Honduras as well as the Amazon River into Central America, however recent studies into their conservation have estimated that their geographical distribution actually extends into the Caribbean and other continents.

There are palm varieties that have become domesticated farm species as an alternative to sourcing from wild palms. The main variety that has been domesticated is Bactris gasipaes, known in English as peach palm. This variety is the most widely used for canning. Peach palms are self-suckering and produce multiple stems, with up to 40 on one plant. This lets producers lower costs by harvesting several stems from a plant while avoiding the death of the palm. Another advantage is that the peach palm has been selectively bred to eliminate the thorns of its wild cousins. Since harvesting is still labor-intensive, palm hearts are regarded as a delicacy.

As of 2008, Costa Rica was the primary source of fresh palm hearts in the U.S. Peach palms are also cultivated in Hawaii, and now have limited distribution on the mainland, primarily to the restaurant trade. Florida's wild Sabal palmetto or cabbage palm was once a source of hearts of palm but is now protected by conservation law.

== Harvesting ==
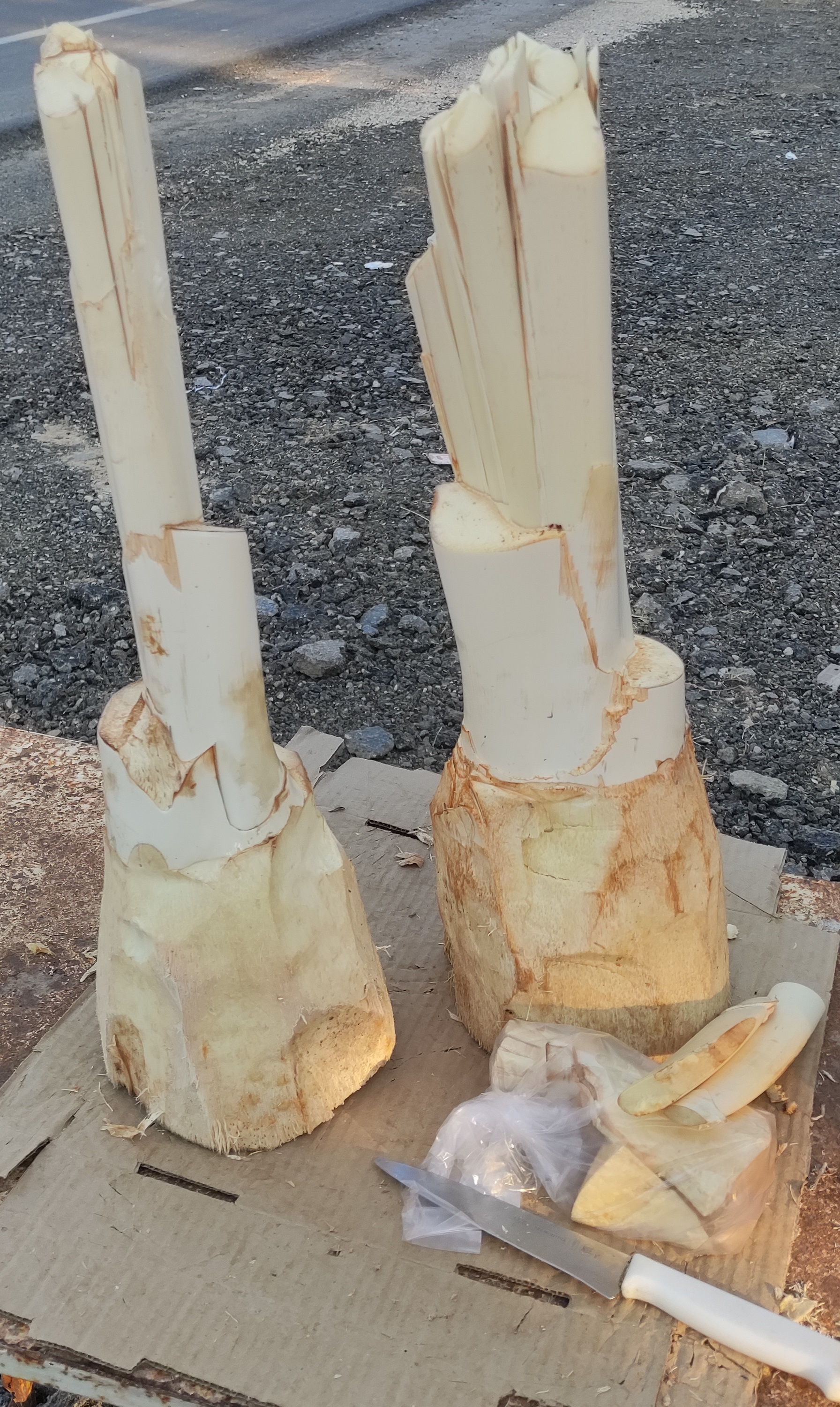
Heart of date palm in Ab Pakhsh (Bushehr province, Iran)

When harvesting the cultivated young palm, the tree is cut down, and the bark is removed, leaving layers of white fibers around the center core. During processing, the fibers are removed, leaving the center core or heart of palm. The center core is attached to a slightly more fibrous cylindrical base with a larger diameter. The entire cylindrical center core and the attached base are edible. The center core is considered more of a delicacy because of its lower fiber content. Arecaceae was brought up in a 2003 article with regard to its long-winded harvesting process. It is mentioned that this palm reaches full maturation within 8–10 years and that the complete removal of the heart requires the ruination of the entire plant. While there are concerns about the negative impacts of harvesting palm hearts, further conservation efforts could be explored using the research on the outcome of adaptations to moisture within the grown environment on the life span of heart of palm seeds.

== See also ==
- Swamp cabbage
- Banana pith
- Palmyra sprout
- Deckenia nobilis
- Sago
