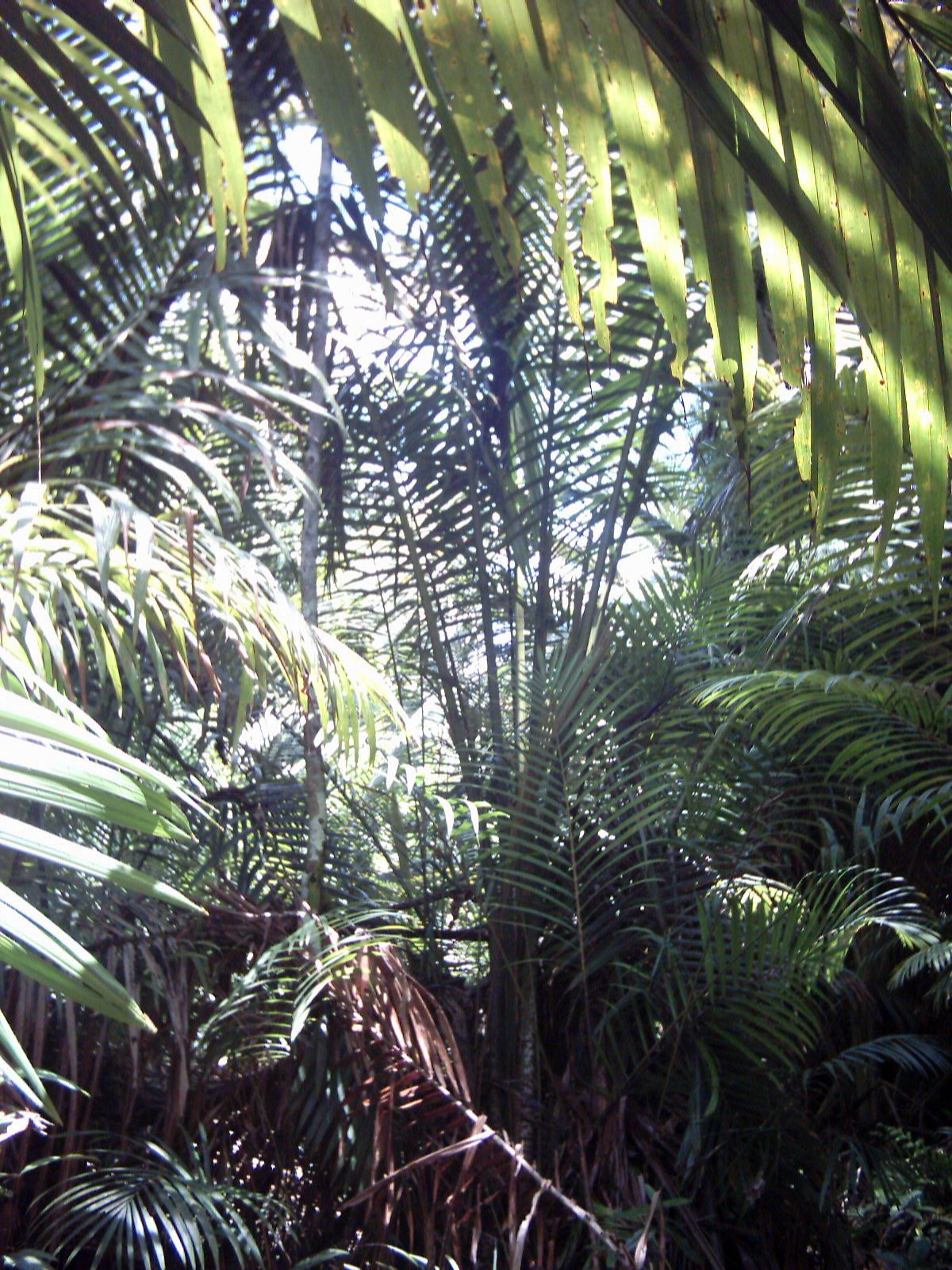
- Metroxylon sagu

Scientific classification
- Kingdom: Plantae
- Clade: Tracheophytes
- Clade: Angiosperms
- Clade: Monocots
- Clade: Commelinids
- Order: Arecales
- Family: Arecaceae
- Subfamily: Calamoideae
- Tribe: Calameae
- Genus: Metroxylon; Rottb.

Species
- M. amicarum (H.Wendl.) Hook.f.; M. paulcoxii McClatchey; M. sagu Rottb.; M. salomonense (Warb.) Becc.; M. upoluense Becc.; M. vitiense (H.Wendl.) Hook.f.; M. warburgii (Heimerl) Becc.

Synonyms
- Sagus Steck; Coelococcus H.Wendl.

= Metroxylon =

Genus of palms

Metroxylon is a genus of monoecious flowering plants in the Arecaceae (palm) family, and commonly called the sago palms, consisting of seven species. They are native to Western Samoa, New Guinea, the Solomon Islands, the Moluccas, the Carolines and Fiji in a variety of habitats, and cultivated westward to Thailand and Malaya.

The name is a combination of two Greek words: metra meaning "womb", commonly translated as "heart" in this context, and xylon meaning "wood", in allusion to the large proportion of pith contained in the plant.

== Description ==
The trunks of Metroxylon species are solitary or clumped and large to massive in size, and usually sprout aerial roots at leaf-scar rings. All but one is monocarpic (hapaxanthic), foliage is pinnate with oversized petioles and leaf sheaths. The petioles are distinguished by "groups of small black spines resembling the record made by a seismograph as it registers a mild tremor". All species have spines on the rachis and petiole. The monocarpic species present a Christmas tree shaped inflorescence, or instead, upward-reaching branches spreading horizontally. These panicles are second only to Corypha spp in size, in the case of Metroxylon salomonense growing up to thirty feet (nine meters) in height by up to fifteen feet (4.6 meters) in width. The fruit, covered in tough shiny scales arranged in precise rows, are relatively large for palms and contain one seed.

=== Extant species ===
It contains the following species

Image	Name	Common name	Distribution
	Metroxylon amicarum (H.Wendl.) Hook.f.	Caroline ivory-nut palm	Pohnpei, Chuuk
	Metroxylon paulcoxii McClatchey		Samoa
	Metroxylon sagu Rottb.	Sago palm	New Guinea, Maluku
	Metroxylon salomonense (Warb.) Becc.	Solomon palm	New Guinea, Maluku, Solomon Islands, Santa Cruz Islands, Bismarck Archipelago, Vanuatu
	Metroxylon upoluense Becc.		Samoa
	Metroxylon vitiense (H.Wendl.) Hook.f.	Fiji sago palm	Wallis and Futuna, Fiji
	Metroxylon warburgii (Heimerl) Becc.	natangura palm	Santa Cruz Islands, Samoa, Vanuatu
