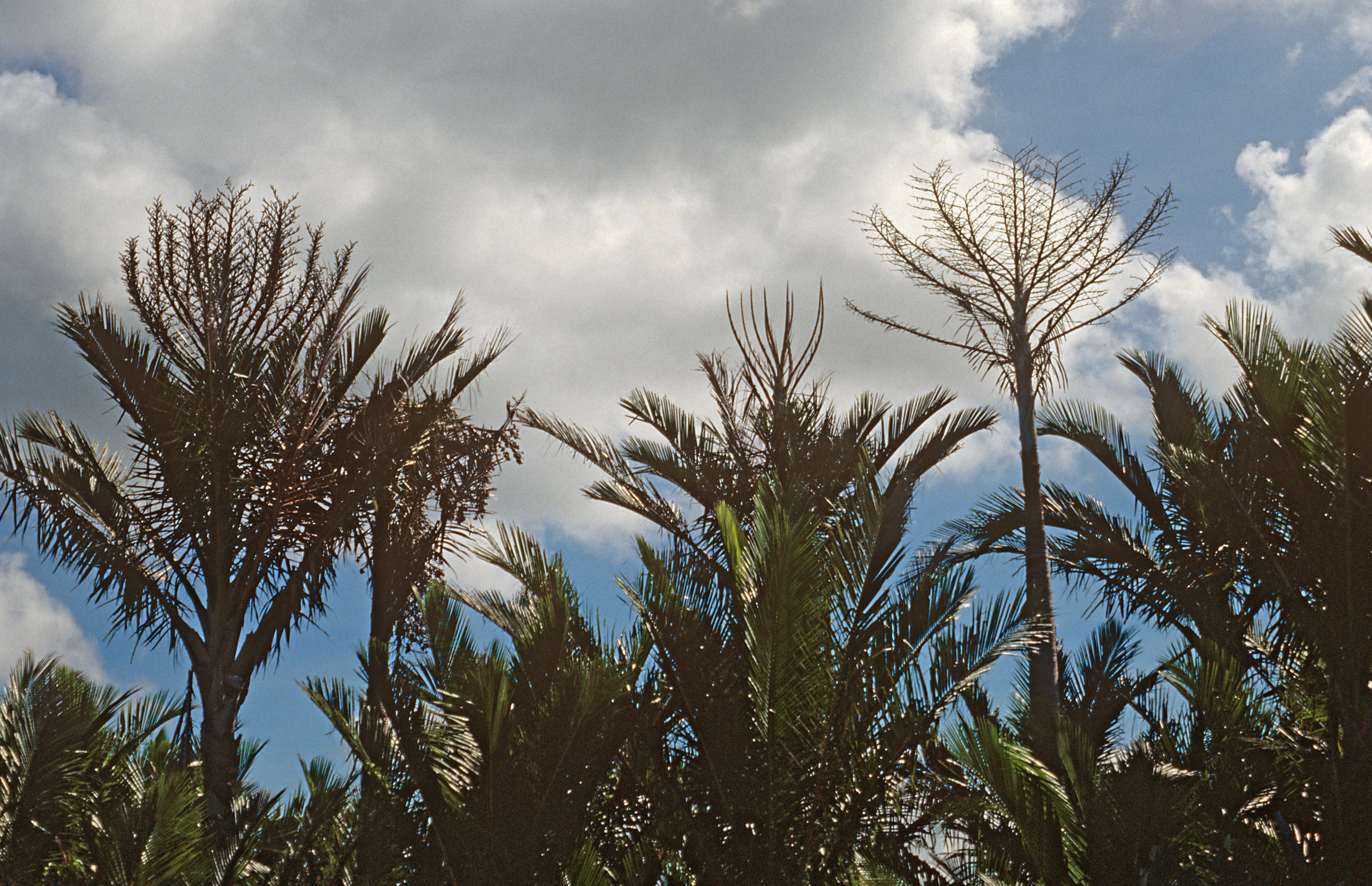
- Sago palms with characteristic terminal inflorescence/infructescence (West Seram, Maluku, Indonesia)

Conservation status
- Least Concern (IUCN 3.1)

Scientific classification
- Kingdom: Plantae
- Clade: Tracheophytes
- Clade: Angiosperms
- Clade: Monocots
- Clade: Commelinids
- Order: Arecales
- Family: Arecaceae
- Genus: Metroxylon
- Species: M. sagu

Binomial name
- Metroxylon sagu Rottb.

Synonyms
- Metroxylon hermaphroditum Hassk.; Metroxylon inerme (Roxb.) Mart.; Metroxylon laeve (Giseke) Mart.; Metroxylon longispinum (Giseke) Mart.; Metroxylon micracanthum Mart.; Metroxylon oxybracteatum Warb. ex K.Schum. & Lauterb.; Metroxylon rumphii (Willd.) Mart.; Metroxylon squarrosum Becc.; Metroxylon sylvestre (Giseke) Mart.; Sagus americana Poir.; Sagus genuina Giseke; Sagus inermis Roxb.; Sagus koenigii Griff.; Sagus laevis Jack; Sagus longispina (Giseke) Blume; Sagus micracantha (Mart.) Blume; Sagus rumphii Willd.; Sagus sagu (Rottb.) H.Karst.; Sagus spinosa Roxb.; Sagus sylvestris (Giseke) Blume

= Metroxylon sagu =

Sago palm

Species of palm

Metroxylon sagu, the true sago palm, is a species of palm in the genus Metroxylon, native to tropical southeastern Asia. The tree is a major source of sago starch.

== Description ==
True sago palm is a suckering (multiple-stemmed) palm, each stem only flowering once (hapaxanthic) with a large upright terminal inflorescence. A stem grows 7–25 metres (23–82 feet) tall before it ends in an inflorescence.

Before flowering, a stem bears about 20 pinnate leaves up to 10 m (33 ft) long. Each leaf has about 150–180 leaflets up to 175 centimetres (5 1/2 ft) long. The inflorescence, 3–7.5 m (10–24 1/2 ft) tall and wide, consists of the continuation of the stem and 15–30 upwardly-curving (first-order) branches spirally arranged on it. Each first-order branch has 15–25 rigid, distichously arranged second-order branches; each second-order branch has 10–12 rigid, distichously arranged third-order branches. Flower pairs are spirally arranged on the third-order branches, each pair consisting of one male and one hermaphrodite flower. The fruit is drupe-like, about 5 cm (2 in) in diameter, covered in scales which turn from bright green to straw-coloured upon ripening.

The sago palm reproduces by fruiting. Each stem (trunk) in a sago palm clump flowers and fruits at the end of its life, but the sago palm as an individual organism lives on through its suckers (shoots that are continuously branching off a stem at or below ground level).

== Distribution and habitat ==
Metroxylon sagu is native to the Maluku Islands and New Guinea. It has been naturalised in other parts of tropical Asia, including Sumatra, Borneo and Thailand. Its habitat is in lowland swamp forests.

== Uses ==
The tree is of commercial importance as the main source of sago, a starch obtained from the trunk by washing the starch kernels out of the pulverized pith with water. A trunk cut just prior to flowering contains enough sago to feed a person for a year. Sago is used in cooking for puddings, noodles, breads, and as a thickener. In the Sepik River region of New Guinea, pancakes made from sago are a staple food, often served with fresh fish. Its leaflets are also used as thatching which can remain intact for up to five years. The dried petioles (called gaba-gaba in Indonesian) are used to make walls and ceilings; they are very light, and therefore also used in the construction of rafts.

To harvest the starch in the stem, it is felled shortly before or early during its final flowering stage when starch content is highest. Sago palm is propagated by man by collecting (cutting) and replanting young suckers rather than by seed.

The upper portion of the trunk's core can be roasted for food; the young nuts, fresh shoots and palm cabbage are also edible.

Research published in 2013 indicates that the sago palm was an important food source for the ancient people of coastal China, in the period prior to the cultivation of rice.

== Culture ==
Sago was noted by the Chinese historian Zhao Rukuo (1170–1231) during the Song dynasty. In his Zhu Fan Zhi (1225), a collection of descriptions of foreign countries, he writes that the "kingdom of Boni (i.e. Brunei) ... produces no wheat, but hemp and rice, and they use sha-hu (sago) for grain".
