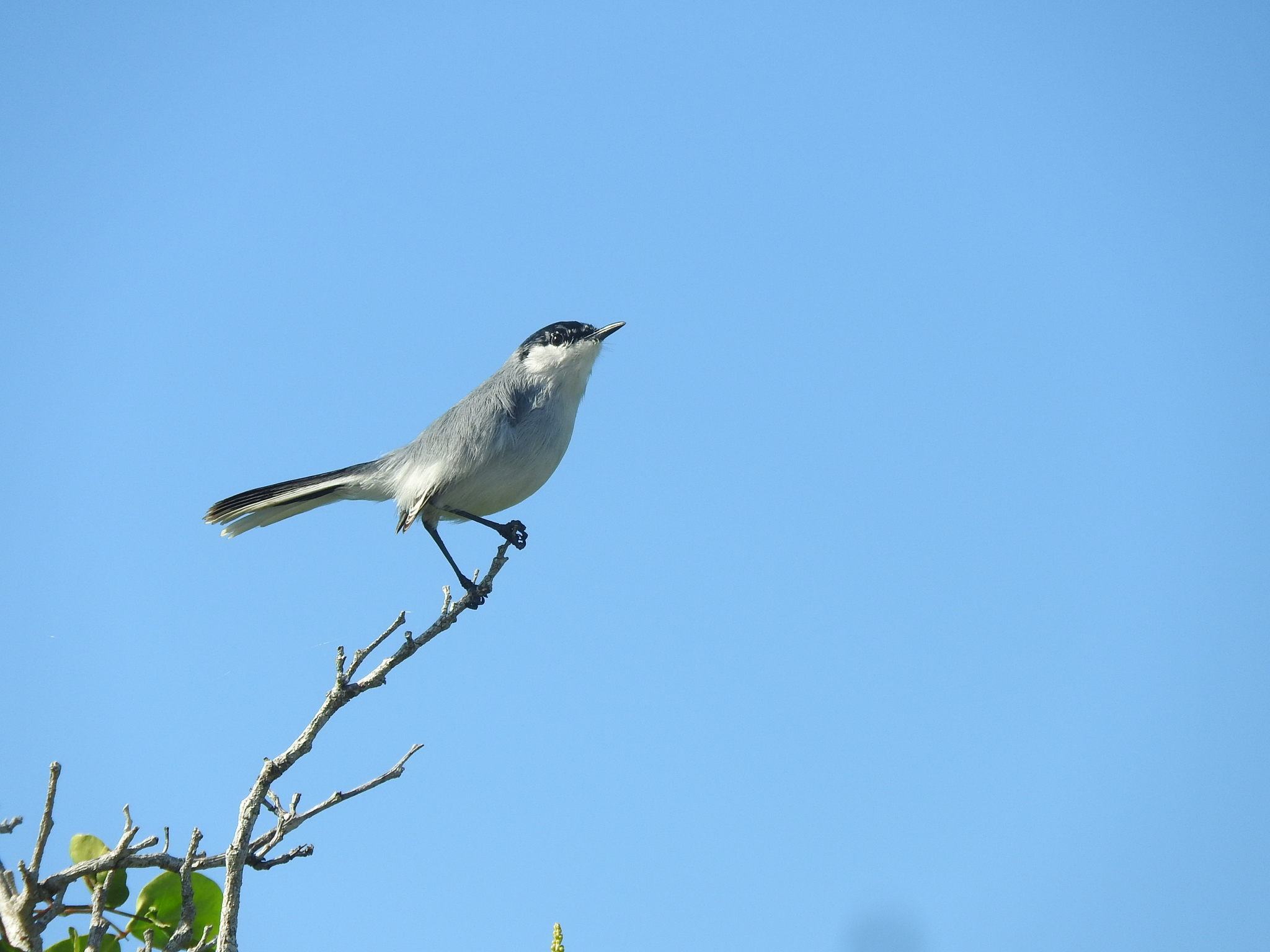

Scientific classification
- Kingdom: Animalia
- Phylum: Chordata
- Class: Aves
- Order: Passeriformes
- Family: Polioptilidae
- Genus: Polioptila
- Species: P. albiventris

Binomial name
- Polioptila albiventris Lawrence, 1885

= Yucatan gnatcatcher =

Species of bird

The Yucatan gnatcatcher (Polioptila albiventris) is a species of bird in the family Polioptilidae. It is endemic to the Yucatán Peninsula in Mexico.

== Taxonomy and systematics ==
The Yucatan gnatcatcher is monotypic.

"The continually changing species to which albiventris has been allied gives testament to the general confusion that has afflicted the classification of most Central American Polioptila taxa." It was originally described as a full species. It was later variously considered a subspecies of tropical gnatcatcher (P. plumbea), black-capped gnatcatcher (P. nigriceps), and "white-browed" gnatcatcher (P. plumbea bilieata) during its time as a separate species. It was most recently considered a subspecies of the white-lored gnatcatcher (P. albiloris) until a 2018 molecular study showed significant differences from all other gnatcatchers.

== Description ==
The Yucatan gnatcatcher is 10 to 12 cm (3.9 to 4.7 in) long. Six males weighed 5.4 to 6.2 g (0.19 to 0.22 oz) and three females 5.0 to 5.7 g (0.18 to 0.20 oz). The female's upperparts are plumbeous gray from the crown to the rump. Its underparts are white with sometimes a pale grayish wash on the flanks. The tail's central feathers are black and each pair out from them are progressively more white until the all white outermost pair. It has a narrow white supercilium. The male's basic (non-breeding) plumage is essentially the same. Its alternate (breeding) plumage is also similar with the addition of a black cap that extends to the middle of its eye.

== Distribution and habitat ==
The Yucatan gnatcatcher is found only on the northern coast of Mexico's Yucatan Peninsula. Its primary habitat is arid coastal scrub, and it also occurs in low deciduous woodlands and coastal mangroves. Most observations are within 50 km (31 mi) of the ocean where the maximum elevation appears to be approximately 200 m (660 ft).

== Behavior ==
=== Feeding ===
No information on the Yucatan gnatcatcher's diet or feeding technique has been published, but in common with others of its genus, "its diet is presumed to consist largely of small invertebrates gleaned from foliage or captured with short sallies."

=== Breeding ===
Though nothing has been published about the Yucatan gnatcatcher's breeding phenology, some information has been gleaned from publicly posted photographs. The nest is a small cup of plant fibers, built by both sexes, and placed in a small tree or shrub. Active nests were found in May and June and fledglings observed in June and July.

=== Vocalization ===
The Yucatan gnatcatcher has two songs, a low-pitched nasal one and a higher-pitched clearer one. Both are in this recording: .

== Status ==
The IUCN has not assessed the Yucatan gnatcatcher. Though it is fairly abundant within its range, the range is small, and "areas currently occupied by the Yucatan Gnatcatcher are under development pressures associated with construction of beach resorts [and] vacation homes".
