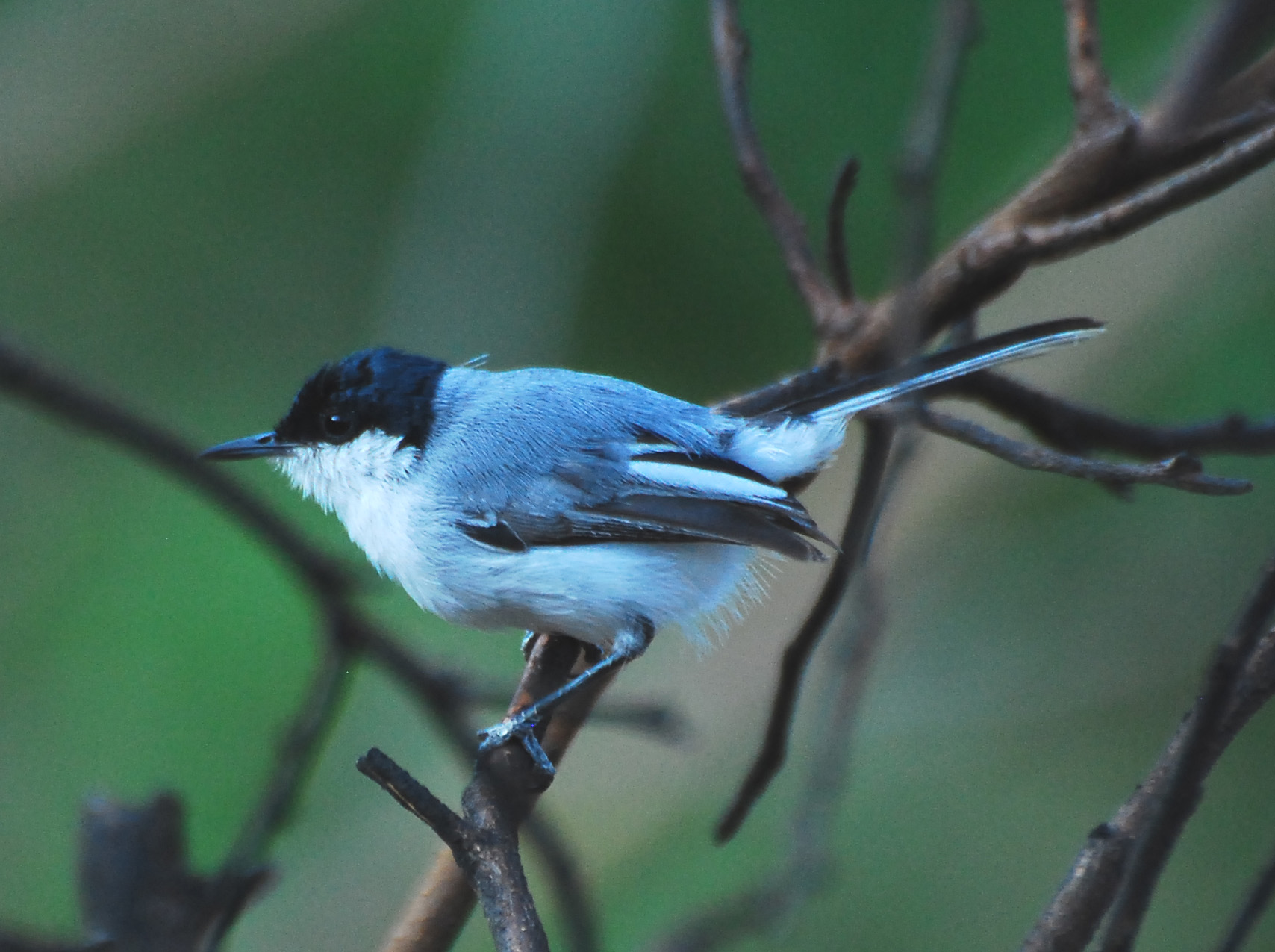
- Tehuantepec, Mexico

Conservation status
- Least Concern (IUCN 3.1)

Scientific classification
- Domain: Eukaryota
- Kingdom: Animalia
- Phylum: Chordata
- Class: Aves
- Order: Passeriformes
- Family: Polioptilidae
- Genus: Polioptila
- Species: P. albiloris

Binomial name
- Polioptila albiloris Sclater, PL & Salvin, 1860

= White-lored gnatcatcher =

Species of bird

The white-lored gnatcatcher (Polioptila albiloris) is a species of bird in the family Polioptilidae. It is found in Costa Rica, El Salvador, Guatemala, Honduras, Mexico, and Nicaragua.

== Taxonomy and systematics ==
The white-lored gnatcatcher was previously considered conspecific with the black-capped gnatcatcher (Polioptila nigriceps). The Yucatan gnatcatcher (P. albiventris) was previously a treated as a subspecies of the white-lored. The white-lored gnatcatcher has two subspecies, the nominate Polioptila albiloris albiloris and P. a. vanrossemi.

== Description ==
The white-lored gnatcatcher is 11 to 12 cm (4.3 to 4.7 in) long and weighs 6 to 9 g (0.21 to 0.32 oz). The nominate male in breeding plumage has a black cap down to the eyes and including the nape. The rest of the upperparts are bluish gray. The tail is black with white outermost feathers. The throat is white becoming pale bluish gray on the breast and flanks. The female has a dark gray cap and the eponymous white lores and supercilium. The juvenile is similar to the female but has browner upperparts. The male P. a. vanrossemi has a larger black cap and longer wings and tail than the nominate.

== Distribution and habitat ==
The nominate white-lored gnatcatcher is found from central Guatemala south through Honduras, El Salvador, and Nicaragua into northwestern Costa Rica. P. a. vanrossemi is found in Mexico from the southern parts of the states of Michoacán, México, and Puebla south to most of Chiapas. It inhabits arid to semi-arid biomes including scrublands, thorn forest, deciduous woodland, and secondary forest. It shuns the interior of tall woodlands. It is mostly found below 1,000 m (3,300 ft) of elevation.

== Behavior ==
=== Feeding ===
The white-lored gnatcatcher's diet is a variety of adult insects, caterpillars, and spiders. It forages mostly by gleaning but will make sallies to catch flying insects.

=== Breeding ===
The white-lored gnatcatcher breeds between March and August. Both sexes build the nest, a deep cup of grass and roots held together with spider silk and lined with fine grass, hair, and other soft materials. The clutch size is four. Bronzed (Molothrus aeneus) and brown-headed cowbirds (M. ater) parasitize the nest.

=== Vocalization ===
The white-lored gnatcatcher has two songs, a "simple" and a "complex" . It also has a variety of calls, for which see Xeno-canto below.

== Status ==
The IUCN has assessed the white-lored gnatcatcher as being of Least Concern. "Neither of the subspecies are restricted to ecoregions that are considered to be at serious risk".
