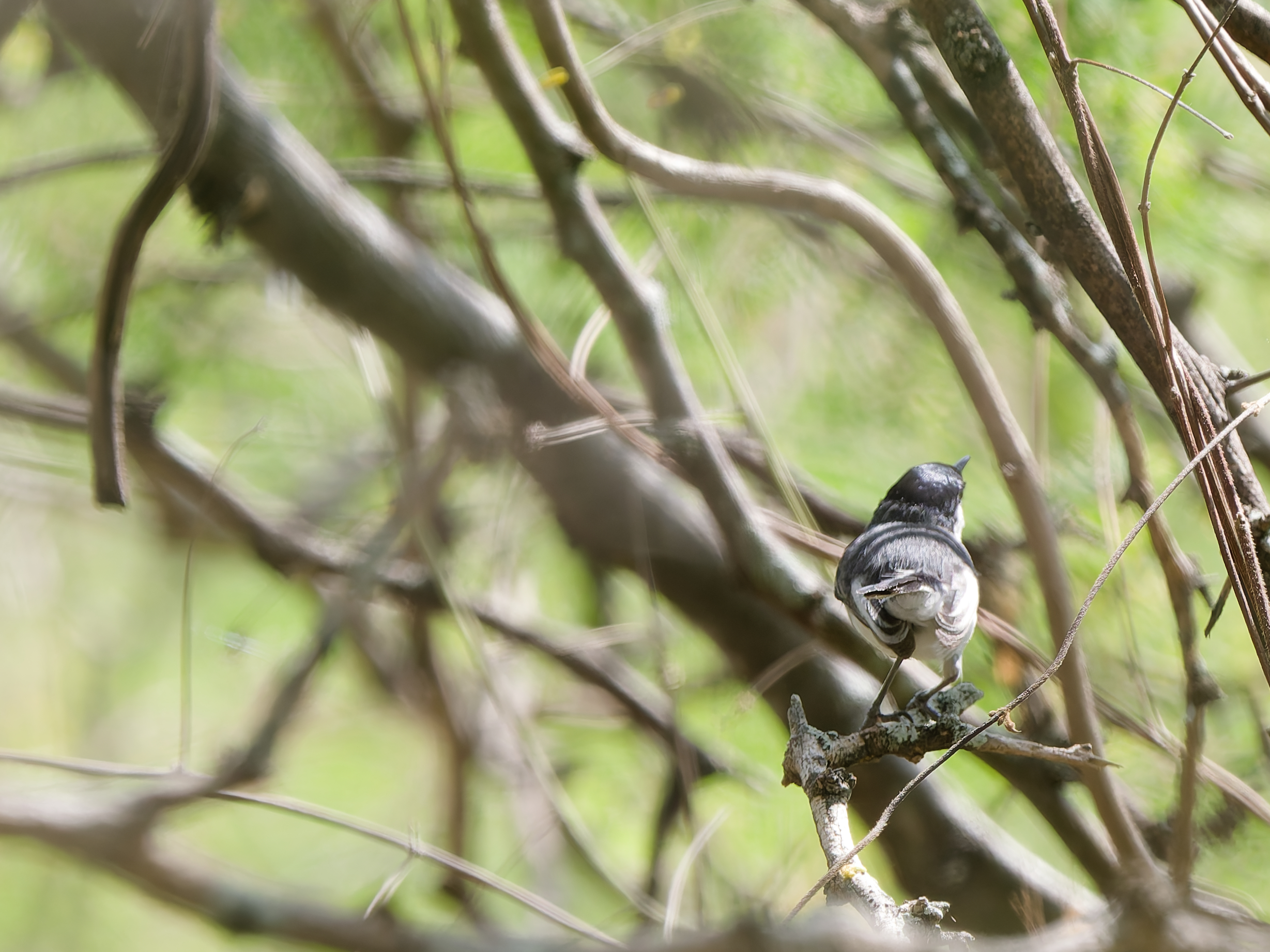
- Marañon Gnatcatcher in Peru

Conservation status
- Least Concern (IUCN 3.1)

Scientific classification
- Domain: Eukaryota
- Kingdom: Animalia
- Phylum: Chordata
- Class: Aves
- Order: Passeriformes
- Family: Polioptilidae
- Genus: Polioptila
- Species: P. maior

Binomial name
- Polioptila maior Hellmayr, 1900

= Marañón gnatcatcher =

Species of bird

The Marañón gnatcatcher (Polioptila maior) is a small active insectivorous songbird, that is found in the upper valleys of the Marañón River in northwest Peru. The species was formerly considered to be conspecific with the tropical gnatcatcher (Polioptila plumbea).

== Taxonomy ==
The Marañón gnatcatcher was formally described in 1900 by the Austrian ornithologist Carl Eduard Hellmayr based on a specimen collected in the Succha District of the Department of Ancash in western Peru. He considered his specimen to be a subspecies of the black-capped gnatcatcher (Polioptila nigriceps) and coined the trinomial name Polioptila nigriceps maior. The Marañón gnatcatcher was formerly considered to be one of the subspecies of the tropical gnatcatcher (Polioptila plumbea) but is now considered to be a separate species based on differences in morphology, genetics and vocalizations as well as the lack of significant sexual dimorphism.
