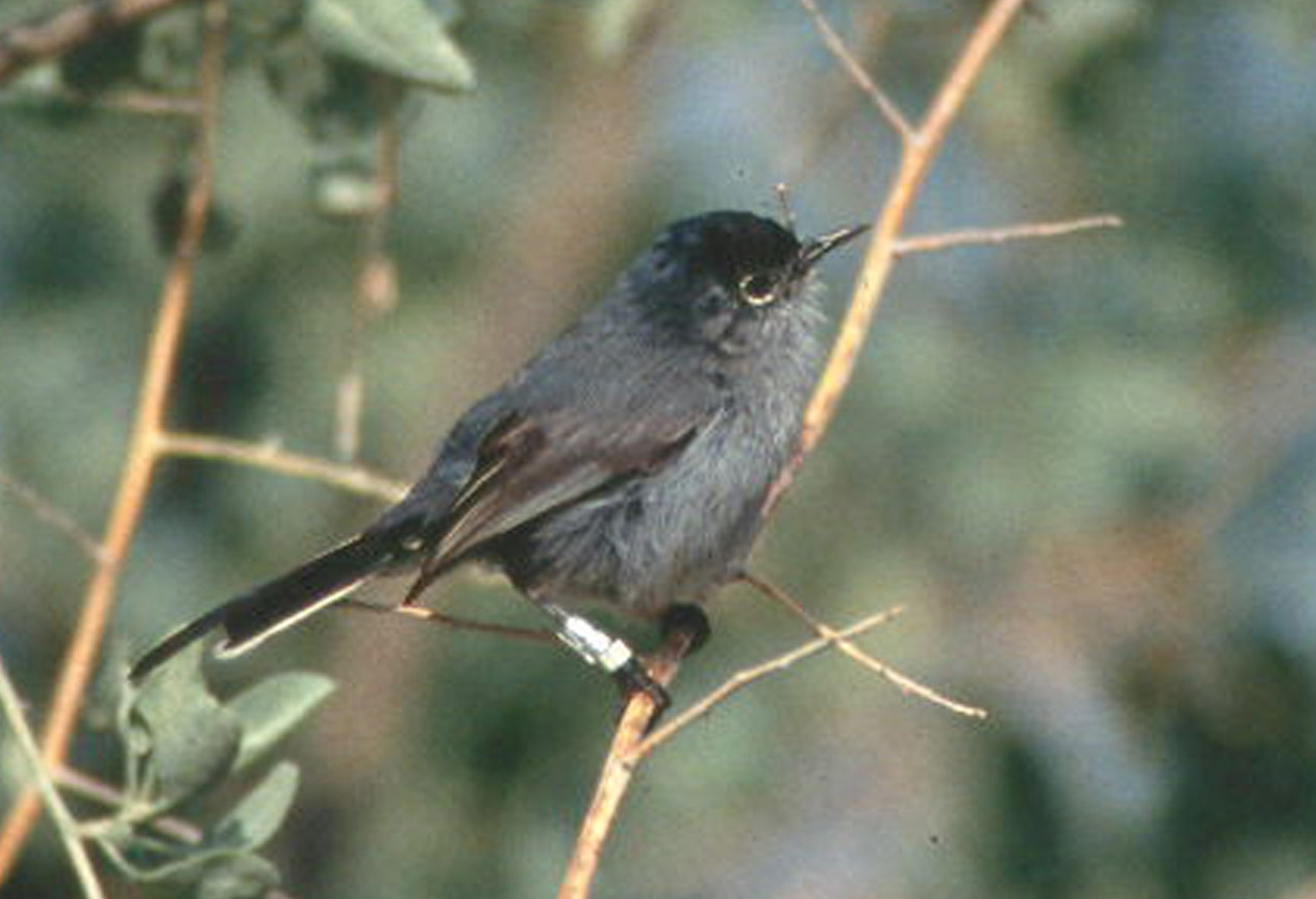
- California gnatcatcher (Polioptila californica)

Scientific classification
- Kingdom: Animalia
- Phylum: Chordata
- Class: Aves
- Order: Passeriformes
- Family: Polioptilidae
- Genus: Polioptila; Sclater, PL, 1855

Type species
- Motacilla caerulea Linnaeus, 1766

= Polioptila =

Genus of birds

Polioptila is a genus of small insectivorous birds in the family Polioptilidae. They are found in North and South America.

The genus Polioptila was introduced by the English zoologist Philip Sclater in 1855. Although he listed several members, he did not specify a type species. This was designated by the American ornithologist Spencer Baird in 1864 as Montacilla caerulea, Linnaeus, now the blue-grey gnatcatcher, Polioptila caerulea. The name of the genus combines the Ancient Greek words πολιος polios "grey" and πτιλον ptilon "plumage".

The genus contains 16 species:

Image	Common name	Scientific name	Distribution
-	Guianan gnatcatcher	Polioptila guianensis	Guiana Shield
	Slate-throated gnatcatcher	Polioptila schistaceigula	Chocó–Magdalena
	Para gnatcatcher	Polioptila paraensis	southern Amazonia
-	Iquitos gnatcatcher	Polioptila clementsi	Allpahuayo-Mishana National Reserve (Peru)
	Marañón gnatcatcher	Polioptila maior	Marañón valley
	Tropical gnatcatcher	Polioptila plumbea	Central and northern South America
	Creamy-bellied gnatcatcher	Polioptila lactea	southern Atlantic Forest
	Masked gnatcatcher	Polioptila dumicola	central/eastern South America
	Cuban gnatcatcher	Polioptila lembeyei	coastal Cuba
	Yucatan gnatcatcher	Polioptila albiventris	northern Yucatán Peninsula
	White-browed gnatcatcher	Polioptila bilineata	southern Mexico to central Peru
	Blue-grey gnatcatcher	Polioptila caerulea	central/southern North America
	Black-tailed gnatcatcher	Polioptila melanura	deserts of southwestern US and northern Mexico
	California gnatcatcher	Polioptila californica	Baja California peninsula
	Black-capped gnatcatcher	Polioptila nigriceps	western Mexico
	White-lored gnatcatcher	Polioptila albiloris	southwestern Mexico and Central America
