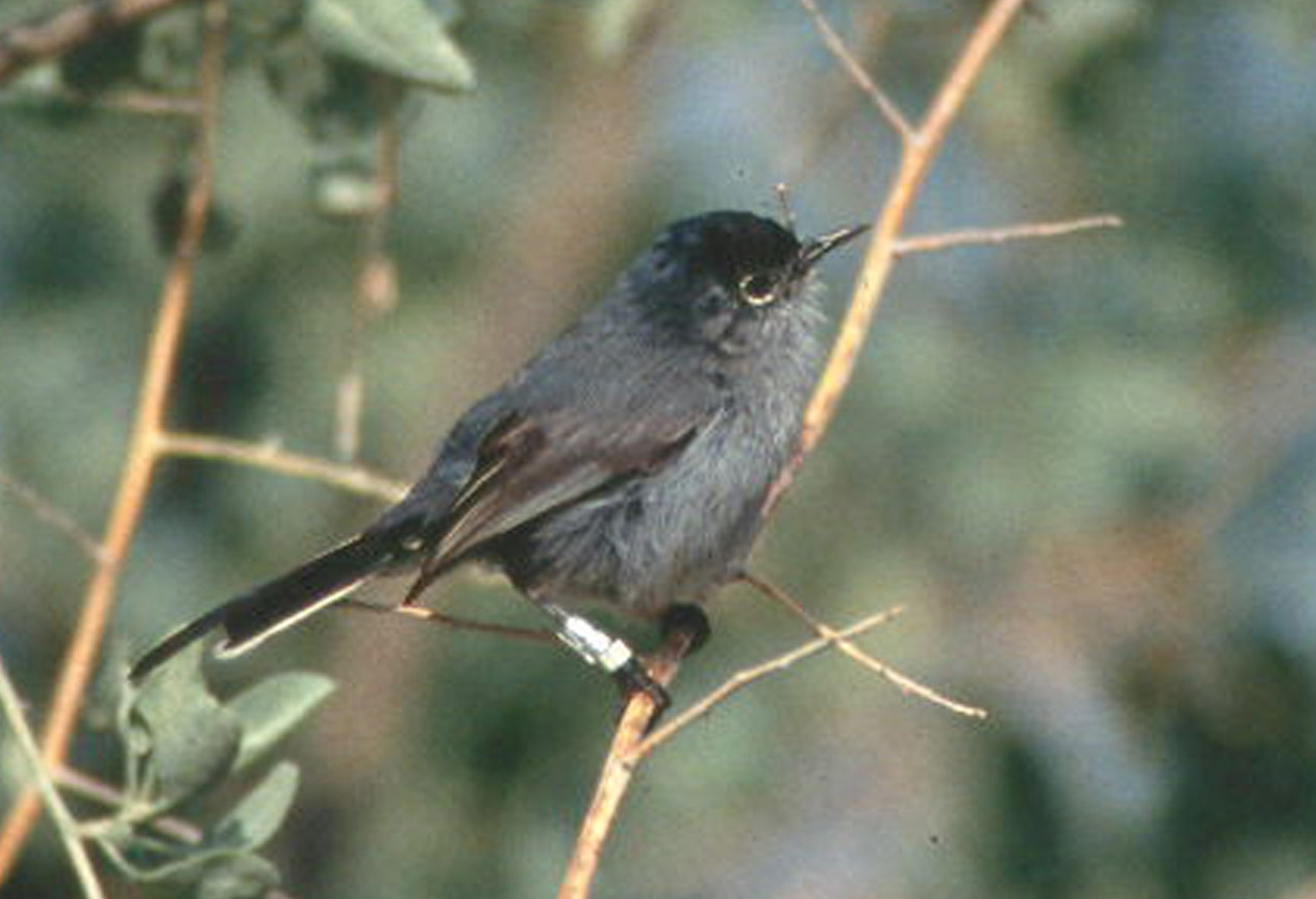
- California gnatcatcher (Polioptila californica)

Scientific classification
- Kingdom: Animalia
- Phylum: Chordata
- Class: Aves
- Order: Passeriformes
- Superfamily: Certhioidea
- Family: Polioptilidae; Baird, 1858

Genera
- Ramphocaenus; Microbates; Polioptila

= Gnatcatcher =

Gnatcatchers

Family of birds

The gnatcatchers are a family of small passerine birds in the family Polioptilidae. The 20 species occur in North and South America (except for the far south and the high Andean regions). Most species of this mainly tropical and subtropical group are resident, but the blue-grey gnatcatcher of the United States and southern Canada migrates south in winter. They are close relatives of the wrens.

== Description ==
These dainty birds are intermediate between Old World warblers and wrens in their structure and habits, moving restlessly through foliage seeking insects. The gnatcatchers are mainly soft bluish grey in color, and have the typical insectivore's long sharp bill. Many species have distinctive black head patterns (especially males) and long, regularly cocked, black-and-white tails. The skulking gnatwrens are browner, more thickset, and with proportionally shorter tails and longer bills.

== Distribution and habitat ==
They are distributed from North to South America, with the exception of the far south and high Andean regions. Gnatwrens typically occur in the undergrowth of dense, often humid, forest, while gnatcatchers, depending on the species involved, occur in anything from dry scrubby habitats (e.g. the California gnatcatcher) to the canopy of humid Amazonian forest (e.g. the Guianan gnatcatcher). The North American species nest in bushes or trees, but the breeding behavior of several of the Neotropical species is essentially unknown.

== Taxonomy and systematics ==
- Certhioidea
  - Tichodromidae: wallcreeper – 1 species
  - - Sittidae: nuthatches – 29 species
    - - - Salpornithidae: spotted creepers – 2 species
        - Certhiidae: treecreepers – 9 species
      - - Polioptilidae: gnatcatchers – 20 species
        - Troglodytidae: wrens – 96 species

Relationships among families in the superfamily Certhioidea.

A species new to science, the critically endangered Iquitos gnatcatcher Polioptila clementsi, was first described in 2005. This species is a member of the Guianan gnatcatcher Polioptila guianensis complex, which recently has been proposed split into three species (four with the Iquitos gnatcatcher), but not all authorities have accepted this (e.g. SACC). Furthermore, other groups should possibly be split, notably the tropical gnatcatcher Polioptila plumbea and masked gnatcatcher Polioptila dumicola complexes, but at present scientific papers on these matters are lacking.

The family contains 20 species divided into 3 genera:

| Image | Genus | Species |
|---|---|---|
| | Ramphocaenus Vieillot, 1819 | Chattering gnatwren, Ramphocaenus sticturus; Trilling gnatwren, Ramphocaenus melanurus |
| | Microbates Sclater & Salvin, 1873 | Tawny-faced gnatwren, Microbates cinereiventris; Collared gnatwren, Microbates collaris |
| | Polioptila Sclater, 1855 | Guianan gnatcatcher, Polioptila guianensis – Guiana Shield; Slate-throated gnatcatcher, Polioptila schistaceigula – Chocó–Magdalena; Para gnatcatcher, Polioptila paraensis – southern Amazonia; Iquitos gnatcatcher, Polioptila clementsi – Allpahuayo-Mishana National Reserve (Peru); Marañón gnatcatcher, Polioptila maior – Marañón valley; Tropical gnatcatcher, Polioptila plumbea – Central and northern South America; Creamy-bellied gnatcatcher, Polioptila lactea – southern Atlantic Forest; Masked gnatcatcher, Polioptila dumicola – central/eastern South America; Cuban gnatcatcher, Polioptila lembeyei – coastal Cuba; Yucatan gnatcatcher, Polioptila albiventris – northern Yucatán Peninsula; White-browed gnatcatcher, Polioptila bilineata – southern Mexico to central Peru; Blue-grey gnatcatcher, Polioptila caerulea – central/southern North America; Black-tailed gnatcatcher, Polioptila melanura – deserts of southwestern US and northern Mexico; California gnatcatcher, Polioptila californica – Baja California peninsula; Black-capped gnatcatcher, Polioptila nigriceps – western Mexico; White-lored gnatcatcher, Polioptila albiloris – southwestern Mexico and Central America |
