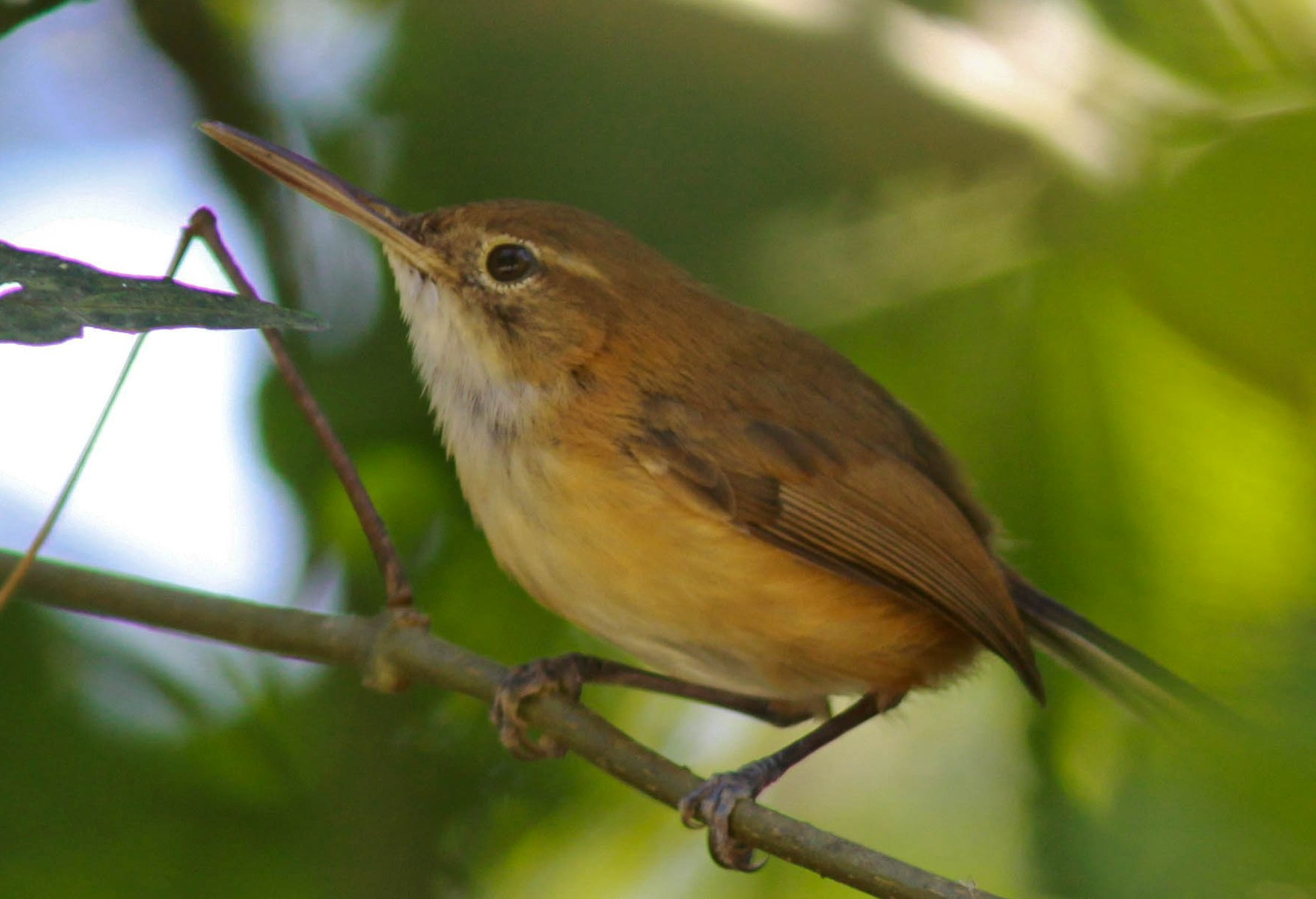

Conservation status
- Least Concern (IUCN 3.1)

Scientific classification
- Kingdom: Animalia
- Phylum: Chordata
- Class: Aves
- Order: Passeriformes
- Family: Polioptilidae
- Genus: Ramphocaenus
- Species: R. melanurus

Binomial name
- Ramphocaenus melanurus Vieillot, 1819

Audio
- Call recorded in Ecuador

= Trilling gnatwren =

Species of bird

The trilling gnatwren (Ramphocaenus melanurus), formerly long-billed gnatwren, is a very small bird in the gnatcatcher family. It found from southeast Mexico south to Ecuador and Amazonia.

== Taxonomy ==
The trilling gnatwren was described by the French ornithologist Louis Pierre Vieillot in 1819 from a specimen collected in Brazil. He coined the binomial name Ramphocaenus melanurus. The genus name Ramphocaenus means "unusual beak", from the Ancient Greek rhamphos (ῥάµϕος, "beak") and cænos (καινός, "strange"). The specific epithet combines the Ancient Greek melas "black" and oura "tail". A molecular phylogenetic study published in 2018 found that two subspecies of Ramphocaenus melanurus formed a separate clade. The subspecies were split off to become the chattering gnatwren and the English name of this species was changed from "long-billed gnatwren" to "trilling gnatwren".

Thirteen subspecies are recognised:

- R. m. rufiventris (Bonaparte, 1838) – south Mexico to west Ecuador
- R. m. ardeleo Van Tyne & Trautman, 1941 – Yucatán Peninsula (southeast Mexico) and north Guatemala
- R. m. panamensis Phillips, AR, 1991 – central and east Panama
- R. m. sanctaemarthae Sclater, PL, 1862 – north Colombia and northwest Venezuela
- R. m. griseodorsalis Chapman, 1912 – west Colombia
- R. m. pallidus Todd, 1913 – Zulia Valley (north central Colombia) and west Venezuela
- R. m. trinitatis Lesson, R, 1839 – east Colombia to north Venezuela, Trinidad
- R. m. albiventris Sclater, PL, 1883 – east Venezuela, the Guianas and north Brazil
- R. m. duidae Zimmer, JT, 1937 – northeast Ecuador to south Venezuela
- R. m. badius Zimmer, JT, 1937 – northeast Peru and southeast Ecuador
- R. m. amazonum Hellmayr, 1907 – east Peru to north central Brazil
- R. m. austerus Zimmer, JT, 1937 – east Brazil south of the Amazon
- R. m. melanurus Vieillot, 1819 – east central Brazil

== Description ==
Adult trilling gnatwrens are 12–13 cm (4.7–5.1 in) in length and weigh 8–11 g (0.28–0.39 oz). They have a long, thin bill and a short cocked tail. The upperparts are grey-brown, with rufous on the sides of the head. The throat is white, shading to buff on the rest of the underparts. The tail is black with white tips to all but the central feathers, and is frequently wagged. R. m. trinitatis, of eastern Colombia, Venezuela and Trinidad has paler underparts, and buff flanks and head sides. The call is a trilled drdrdrdrdrdrdrdrdrdr.

== Habitat ==
It is found in the undergrowth and vines of dry forest and secondary woodland from Mexico south to Peru and Brazil, and on Trinidad.

== Behaviour ==
=== Breeding ===
Trilling gnatwrens build a deep cup nest very low in a small plant or sapling. The two white eggs are incubated by both parents for 16–17 days to hatching, with a further 11–12 days to fledging.

=== Feeding ===
Trilling gnatwrens forage actively in vegetation, eating mainly insects, insect eggs and spiders. They usually occur in pairs or family groups.
