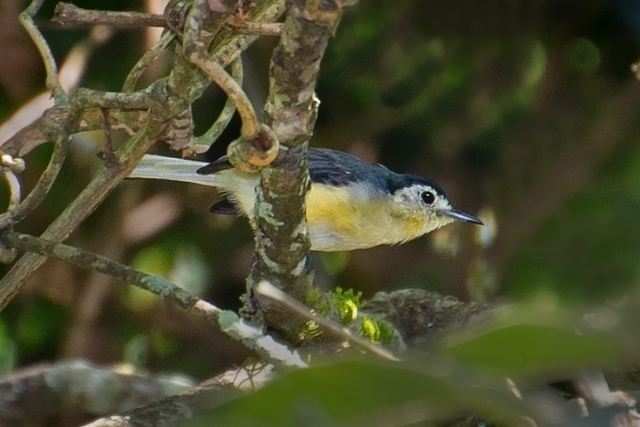
- In Rio Grande do Sul, Brazil

Conservation status
- Least Concern (IUCN 3.1)

Scientific classification
- Kingdom: Animalia
- Phylum: Chordata
- Class: Aves
- Order: Passeriformes
- Family: Polioptilidae
- Genus: Polioptila
- Species: P. lactea

Binomial name
- Polioptila lactea Sharpe, 1885

= Creamy-bellied gnatcatcher =

Species of bird

The creamy-bellied gnatcatcher (Polioptila lactea) is a species of bird in the family Polioptilidae. It is found in Argentina, Brazil, and Paraguay.

== Taxonomy and systematics ==
The creamy-bellied gnatcatcher is monotypic. It has occasionally been thought to be conspecific with the tropical gnatcatcher (P. plumbea).

== Description ==
The creamy-bellied gnatcatcher is 10 to 12 cm (3.9 to 4.7 in) long and weighs approximately 7 g (0.25 oz). The male has a bluish-black cap and white lores and supercilium. Its upperparts are dark slate blue. Its long tail's central feathers are black and the outermost white with those between being black and white. Its cheeks and underparts are pale yellowish transitioning to white on the lower belly. The female and juvenile are similar to the male but with slate gray crowns.

== Distribution and habitat ==
The creamy-bellied gnatcatcher is found in southern Brazil from Mato Grosso do Sul and Rio de Janeiro states south to Santa Catarina state and adjoining southeastern Paraguay and northeastern Argentina. It inhabits several biomes including open humid forest and its edges, temperate rainforest, semi-deciduous forest, and scrublands. It elevation it usually occurs below 400 m (1,300 ft).

== Behavior ==
=== Feeding ===
The creamy-bellied gnatcatcher's diet is not well known but is probably small insects and spiders. It forages by gleaning and hover-gleaning foliage, alone and in mixed-species foraging flocks.

=== Breeding ===
Almost nothing is known about the creamy-bellied gnatcatcher's breeding phenology. One nest has been described. It was built by both sexes of moss and leaves in the crotch of a branch near the top of a 30 m (98 ft) high tree.

=== Vocalization ===
The creamy-bellied gnatcatcher's song is "a simple, rather fast repetition...tee tee tee tee swee swee swee" . Its call is spie .

== Status ==
The IUCN has assessed the creamy-bellied gnatcatcher as Least Concern is 2023, an improvement from its previous assessment of Near Threatened. "This species is restricted to lowland forest in a region where habitat destruction has been widespread...and existing populations are likely to be highly fragmented."
