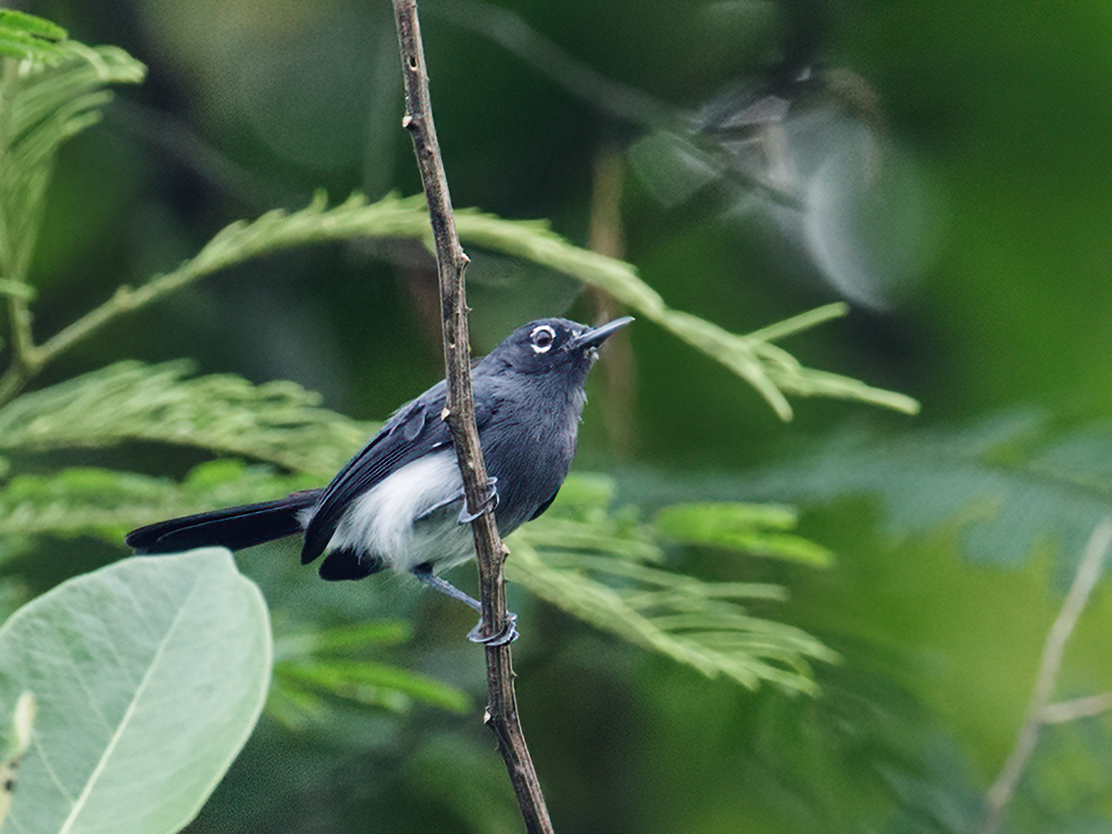

Conservation status
- Least Concern (IUCN 3.1)

Scientific classification
- Kingdom: Animalia
- Phylum: Chordata
- Class: Aves
- Order: Passeriformes
- Family: Polioptilidae
- Genus: Polioptila
- Species: P. schistaceigula

Binomial name
- Polioptila schistaceigula Hartert, 1898

= Slate-throated gnatcatcher =

Species of bird

The slate-throated gnatcatcher (Polioptila schistaceigula) is a species of bird in the family Polioptilidae. It is found in Colombia, Ecuador, and Panama.

== Taxonomy and systematics ==
The slate-throated gnatcatcher is monotypic. It is apparently sister the Guianan gnatcatcher (Polioptila guaianensis) group and at one time it was suggested that they were conspecific.

== Description ==
The slate-throated gnatcatcher is 10 to 11 cm (3.9 to 4.3 in) long and weighs approximately 6 g (0.21 oz). Its crown, the sides of the head, and the upperparts are slate gray, darker on the back. Its cheeks are whitish, its throat and breast sooty, and its belly and flanks white. Its tail is mostly black with some white on the outermost feathers. The sexes are alike.

== Distribution and habitat ==
The slate-throated gnatcatcher is found from central and eastern Panama south through western Colombia into northwestern Ecuador. It inhabits humid primary forest, mature secondary forest, and their borders. In elevation it mostly ranges up to 750 m (2,460 ft).

== Behavior ==
=== Feeding ===
The slate-throated gnatcatcher's diet is poorly known, but it is probably small arthropods like those of other Polioptila gnatcatchers. To feed it actively moves through the canopy and sub-canopy, and lower at the forest edges. It follows mixed-species foraging flocks singly or in pairs.

=== Breeding ===
No information has been published about the slate-throated gnatcatcher's breeding phenology.

=== Vocalization ===
The slate-throated gnatcatcher's most frequent vocalization is "a short, rather faint, ascending trill, 'trrrrrrt'" . It also has a nasal mewing call .
