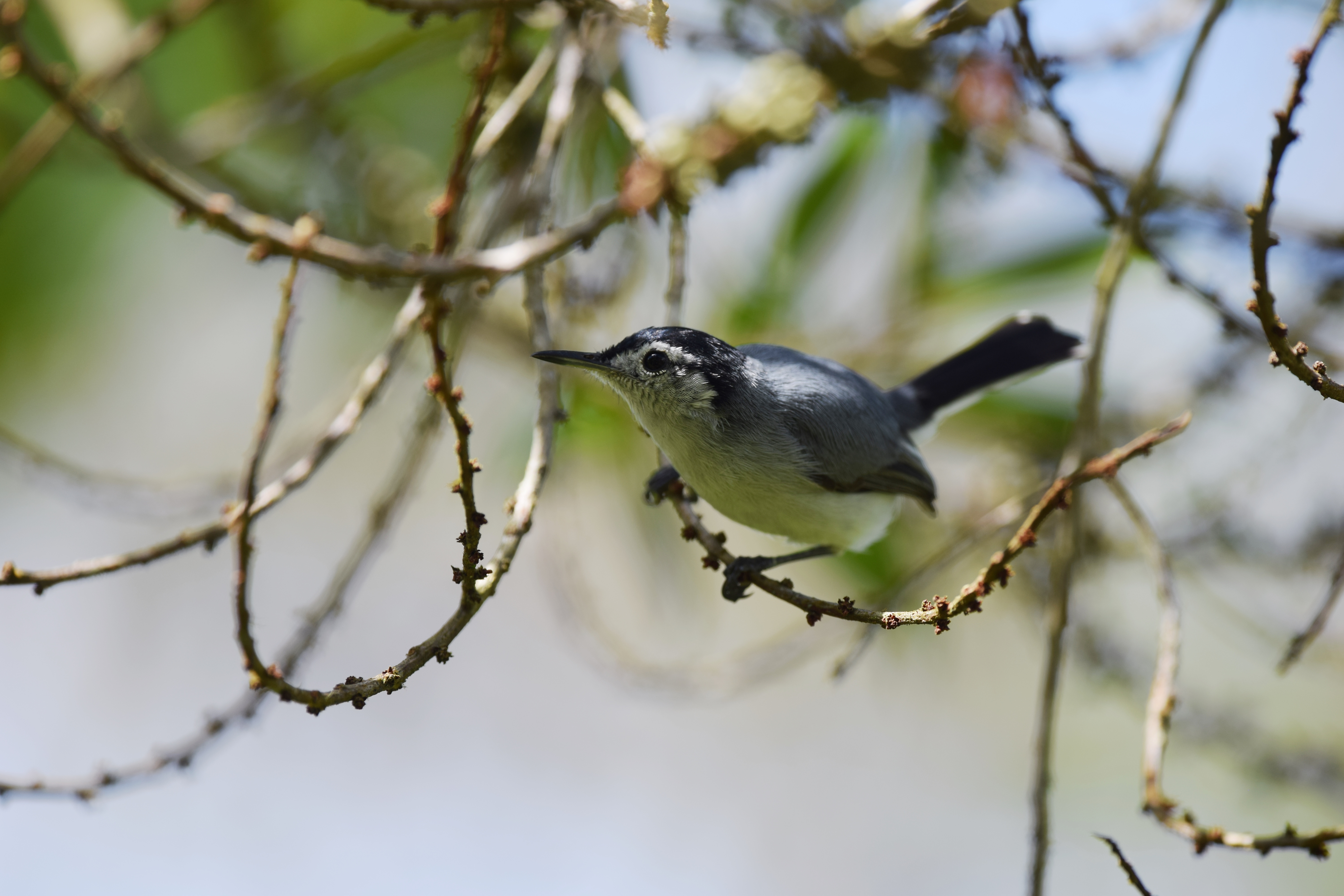

Scientific classification
- Kingdom: Animalia
- Phylum: Chordata
- Class: Aves
- Order: Passeriformes
- Family: Polioptilidae
- Genus: Polioptila
- Species: P. bilineata

Binomial name
- Polioptila bilineata (Bonaparte, 1850)

= White-browed gnatcatcher =

Species of bird

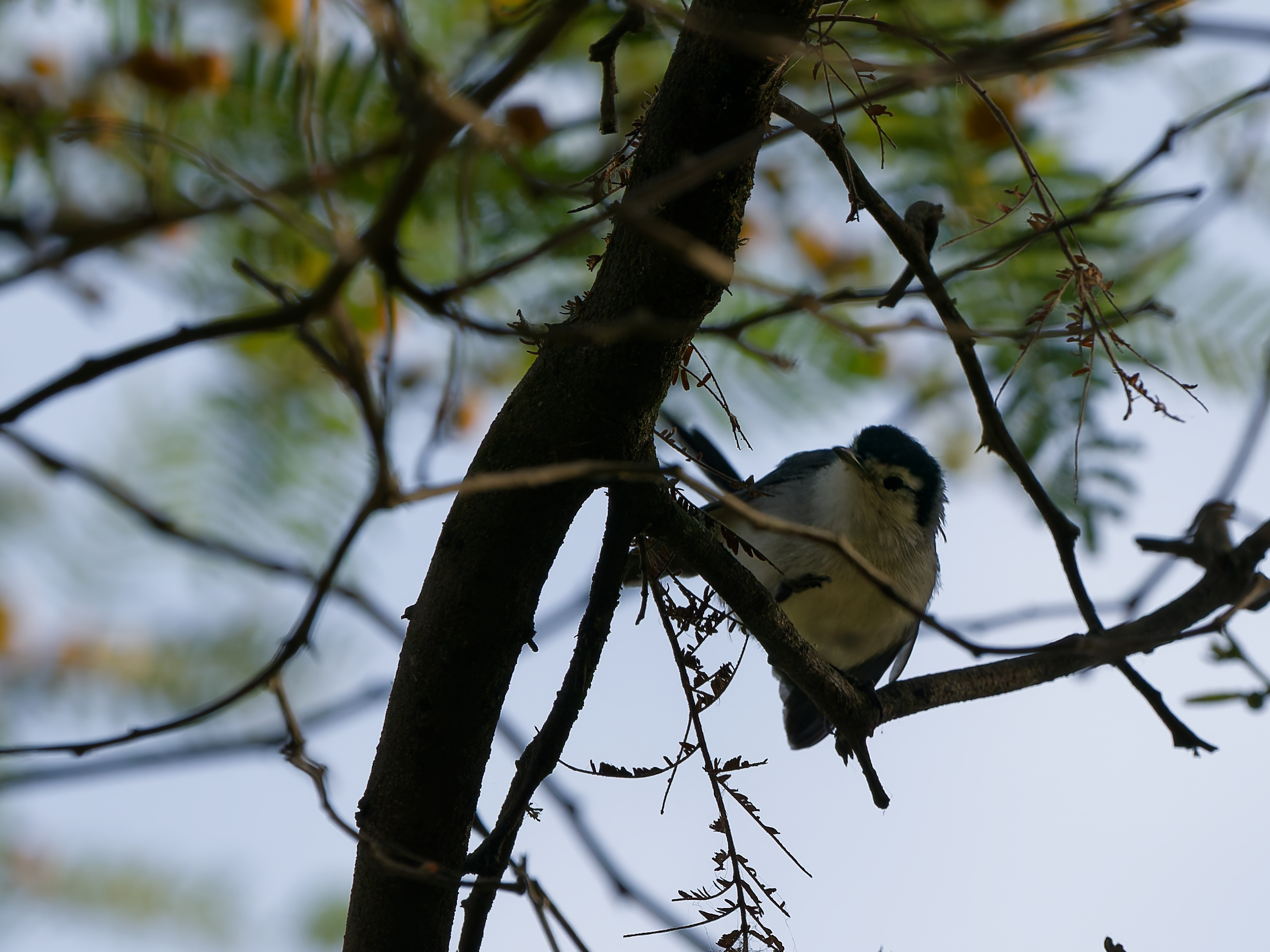
White-browed gnatcatcher

The white-browed gnatcatcher (Polioptila bilineata) is a species of bird in the gnatcatcher family Polioptilidae. It is native to central and South America.

This species was formerly considered a subspecies of the tropical gnatcatcher (Polioptila plumbea).

== Taxonomy ==
The white-browed gnatcatcher was formally described in 1850 by the French naturalist Charles Lucien Bonaparte and given the binomial name Sylvia bilineata. Bonaparte specified the locality as Cartagena, a city on the Caribbean coast of Colombia. This species was formerly considered as a subspecies of the tropical gnatcatcher (Polioptila plumbea). The white-browed gnatcatcher was split from the tropical gnatcatcher based on morphology and phylogenetic data.

Five subspecies are recognised:

- Polioptila bilineata brodkorbi Parkes, 1979 – south Mexico to north Costa Rica
- Polioptila bilineata superciliaris Lawrence, 1861 – north-central Costa Rica to north Colombia
- Polioptila bilineata cinericia Wetmore, 1957 – Coiba (island off south Panama)
- Polioptila bilineata bilineata (Bonaparte, 1850) – northwest Colombia to northwest Peru
- Polioptila bilineata daguae Chapman, 1915 – west-central Colombia
