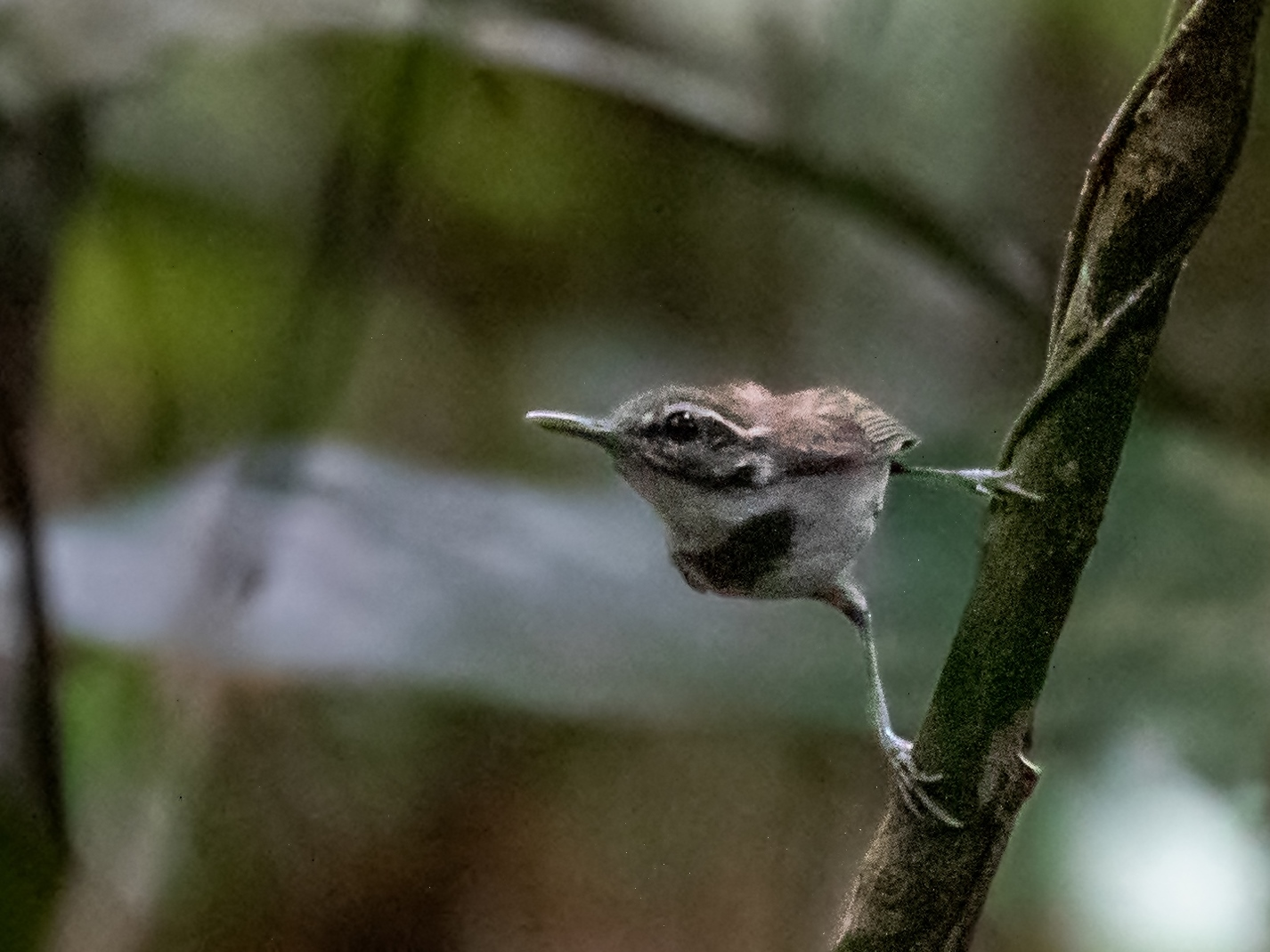

Conservation status
- Least Concern (IUCN 3.1)

Scientific classification
- Kingdom: Animalia
- Phylum: Chordata
- Class: Aves
- Order: Passeriformes
- Family: Polioptilidae
- Genus: Microbates
- Species: M. collaris

Binomial name
- Microbates collaris (Pelzeln, 1868)

= Collared gnatwren =

Species of bird

The collared gnatwren (Microbates collaris) is a species of bird in the family Polioptilidae, the gnatcatchers. It is found in Brazil, Colombia, Ecuador, French Guiana, Guyana, Peru, Suriname, and Venezuela.

== Taxonomy and systematics ==
The International Ornithological Committee (IOC) and BirdLife International (BLI) recognize five subspecies of collared gnatwren:

- M. c. paraguensis Phelps & Phelps Jr. (1946)
- M. c. collaris Pelzeln (1868)
- M. c. torquatus Sclater & Salvin (1873)
- M. c. perlatus Todd (1927)
- M. c. colombianus Parkes (1980)

However, the Clements taxonomy has not accepted M. c. torquatus and M. c. colombianus as subspecies. It includes torquatus in collaris and does not seem to address colombianus, though it might be included in perlatus.

== Description ==
The collared gnatwren is approximately 11 cm (4.3 in) long and weighs 10 to 12 g (0.35 to 0.42 oz). The nominate subspecies is brown above and mostly creamy white below. Its head has a brown crown, white supercilium, cheek, and throat, and a thick black line through the eye. The underside has a wide black band across the chest and olive-brown flanks. The sexes are similar. The other subspecies differ in the intensity and in some cases the hue of the upperparts and flanks and the width of some facial markings.

== Distribution and habitat ==
The subspecies of the collared gnatwren are distributed thus:

- M. c. paraguensis, eastern Venezuela
- M. c. collaris sensu stricto, southeastern Colombia, southern Venezuela, and northern Brazil
- M. c. torquatus, the Guianas and Brazil's Amapá state
- M. c. perlatus sensu stricto, south-southeastern Colombia, northeastern Peru, and northwestern Brazil
- M. c. colombianus, south-central Colombia and northeastern Ecuador

The collared gnatwren generally inhabits the undergrowth of wet, humid, terra firme forest, usually near water and mostly below 500 m (1,600 ft) elevation. It seldom occurs in forest edges. In French Guiana and Suriname it occurs in primary rainforest.

== Behavior ==
=== Feeding ===
The collared gnatwren's diet is almost exclusively small arthropods. It forages very near the ground picking prey from foliage and probing leaf litter. It often joins mixed-species foraging flocks and may follow army ant swarms.

=== Breeding ===
Information on the collared gnatwren's breeding phenology is sparse. An active nest was found in mid-May in Brazil and fledglings were observed in Guyana between August and October. The nest was a bulky cup constructed of rotted leaves lined with soft material and hidden close to the ground in a palmetto. It contained two eggs.

=== Vocalization ===
The collared gnatwren's song is "a series of soft, thin notes, 'peeee' or 'eeeeea'" . It has an alarm call .

== Status ==
The IUCN has assessed the collared gnatwren as being of Least Concern. "None of the races is restricted to ecoregions considered to be under serious threat according to current and projected conservation status."
