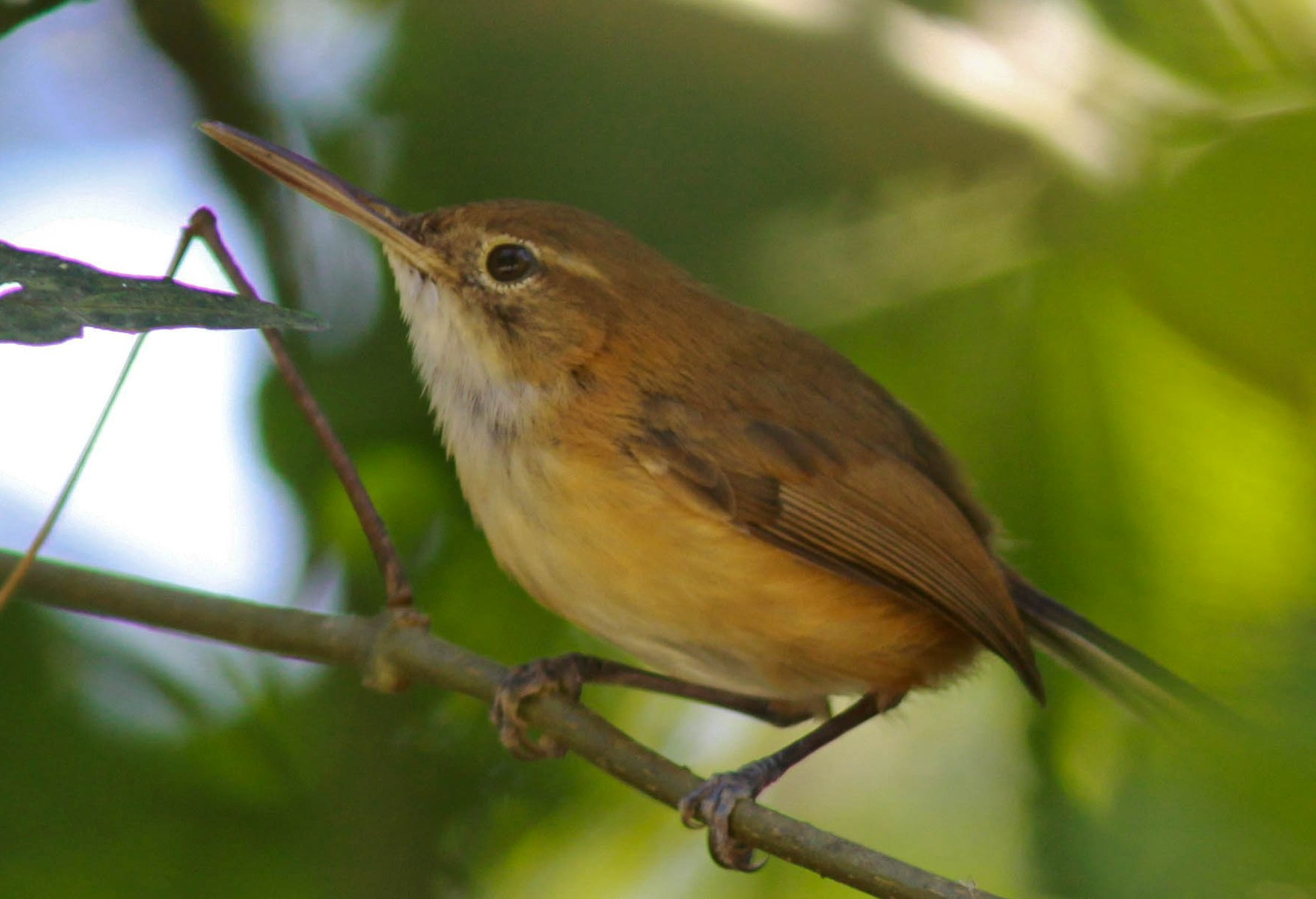
- Trilling gnatwren (Ramphocaenus melanurus)

Scientific classification
- Kingdom: Animalia
- Phylum: Chordata
- Class: Aves
- Order: Passeriformes
- Family: Polioptilidae
- Genus: Ramphocaenus; Vieillot, 1819

Type species
- Ramphocaenus melanurus Vieillot, 1819

= Ramphocaenus =

Genus of birds

Ramphocaenus is a genus of passerine bird from South America.

== Species ==
Ramphocaenus contains the following two species:

Image	Common name	Scientific name
	Chattering gnatwren	Ramphocaenus sticturus
	Trilling gnatwren	Ramphocaenus melanurus
