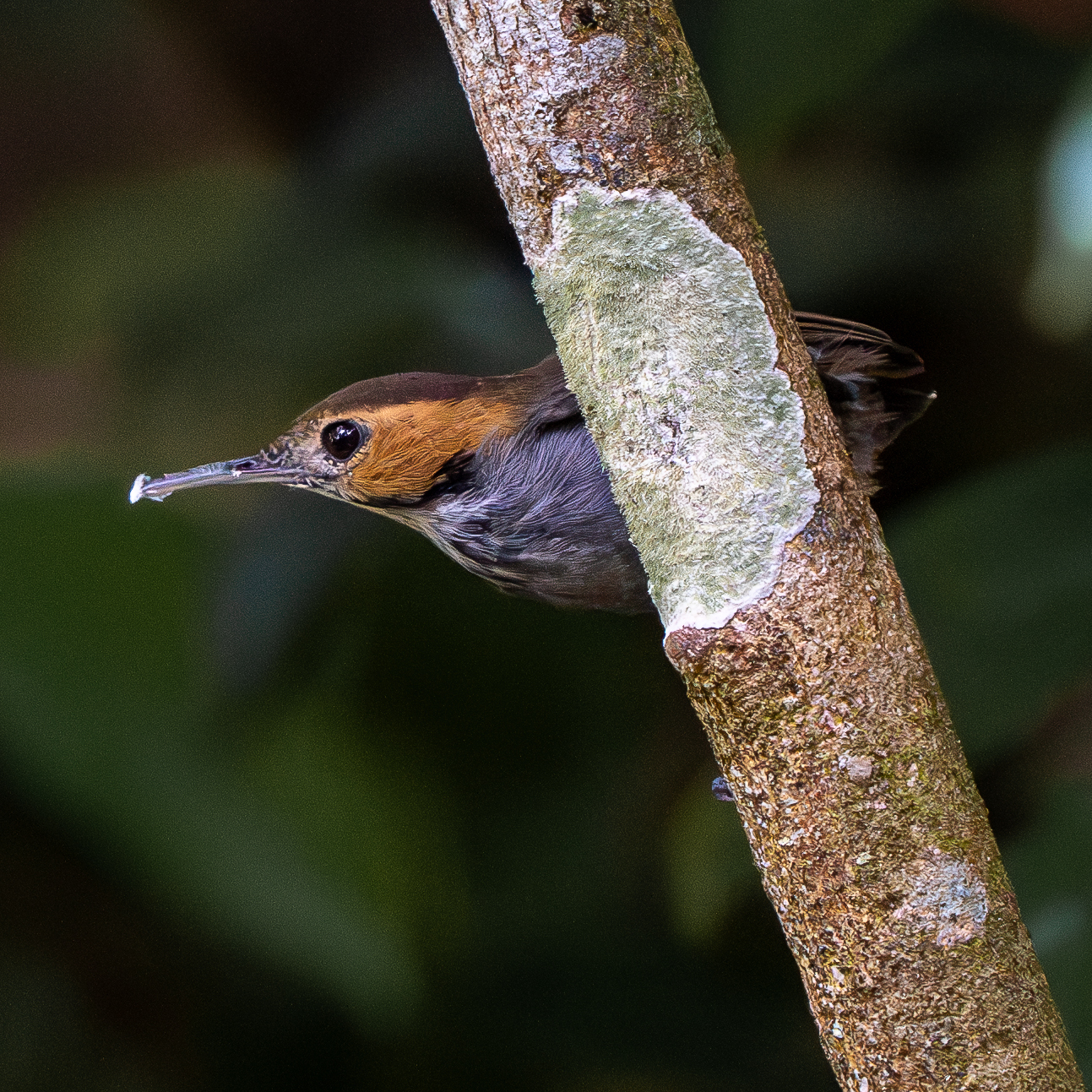

Conservation status
- Least Concern (IUCN 3.1)

Scientific classification
- Kingdom: Animalia
- Phylum: Chordata
- Class: Aves
- Order: Passeriformes
- Family: Polioptilidae
- Genus: Microbates
- Species: M. cinereiventris

Binomial name
- Microbates cinereiventris (Sclater, PL, 1855)

= Tawny-faced gnatwren =

Species of bird

The tawny-faced gnatwren or half-collared gnatwren (Microbates cinereiventris) is a species of bird in the family Polioptilidae, the gnatcatchers. It is found in Bolivia, Colombia, Costa Rica, Ecuador, Nicaragua, Panama, and Peru.

== Taxonomy and systematics ==
The International Ornithological Committee (IOC) and BirdLife International (BLI) recognize seven subspecies of tawny-faced gnatwren:

- Microbates cinereiventris semitorquatus Lawrence (1862)
- Microbates cinereiventris albapiculus Olson (1980)
- Microbates cinereiventris magdalenae Chapman (1915)
- Microbates cinereiventris cinereiventris Sclater (1855)
- Microbates cinereiventris unicus Olson (1980)
- Microbates cinereiventris hormotus Olson (1980)
- Microbates cinereiventris peruvianus Chapman (1923)

However, the South American Classification Committee of the American Ornithological Society (SACC/AOS) and the Clements taxonomy have not accepted the three subspecies that Olson described but include them within M. c. peruvianus.

== Description ==
The tawny-faced gnatwren is 9 to 11 cm (3.5 to 4.3 in) long and weighs 10 to 14 g (0.35 to 0.49 oz). The nominate subspecies has a rusty face with a rufous crown and a thin black stripe behind the eye. A wide black malar stripe ("moustache") separates its face from the white throat and upper breast; the last has thin black stripes. Its back is brown and its underparts are gray. The sexes are alike. The other subspecies differ in the intensity of their cheek and underparts colors, and some do not have the black stripe behind the eye.

== Distribution and habitat ==
The subspecies of tawny-faced gnatwren are distributed thus:

- Microbates cinereiventris semitorquatus, the Caribbean slope from southeastern Nicaragua through Costa Rica and Panama into extreme northwestern Colombia, and also the Pacific slope of central Panama
- Microbates cinereiventris albapiculus, the Cauca Valley of northern Colombia
- Microbates cinereiventris magdalenae, the Magdalena River Valley of northern Colombia
- Microbates cinereiventris cinereiventris, from Panama's Darién Province south along the Pacific coast through Colombia to southwestern Ecuador.
- Microbates cinereiventris unicus, central Colombia
- Microbates cinereiventris hormotus, southern Colombia, eastern Ecuador, and northeastern Peru
- Microbates cinereiventris peruvianus sensu stricto, eastern Peru and western Bolivia

The tawny-faced gnatwren generally inhabits the lower strata of wet, humid, primary and secondary forest, mostly below 750 m (2,460 ft) elevation. The exception is M. c. unicus, which is "known only from a single specimen...[collected] on an undetermined date between 1930 and 1943" in a much drier biome.

== Behavior ==
=== Feeding ===
The tawny-faced gnatwren's diet is primarily ants and other insects but also includes spiders. It forages through foliage and leaf litter while hopping through undergrowth near the ground. It regularly joins mixed-species foraging flocks but rarely follows army ant swarms.

=== Breeding ===
Information on the tawny-faced gnatwren's breeding phenology is sparse. Nesting has been recorded in April in Costa Rica and between December and May in Colombia. The one fully-described nest was constructed of green moss with a soft inner lining. It was attached to the trunk and a limb of a broadleaf shrub and contained two eggs.

=== Vocalization ===
The tawny-faced gnatwren's song is "a series of soft, clear, plaintive notes, 'teeeeea' or 'teeeéuw'" . Its most common call is "a nasal, complaining 'nyeeeh' or 'nyaaah'" . It also makes a chatter .

== Status ==
The IUCN has assessed the tawny-faced gnatwren as being of Least Concern. However, "Three races...are primarily restricted to ecoregions considered...to be seriously threatened as a result of habitat loss".
