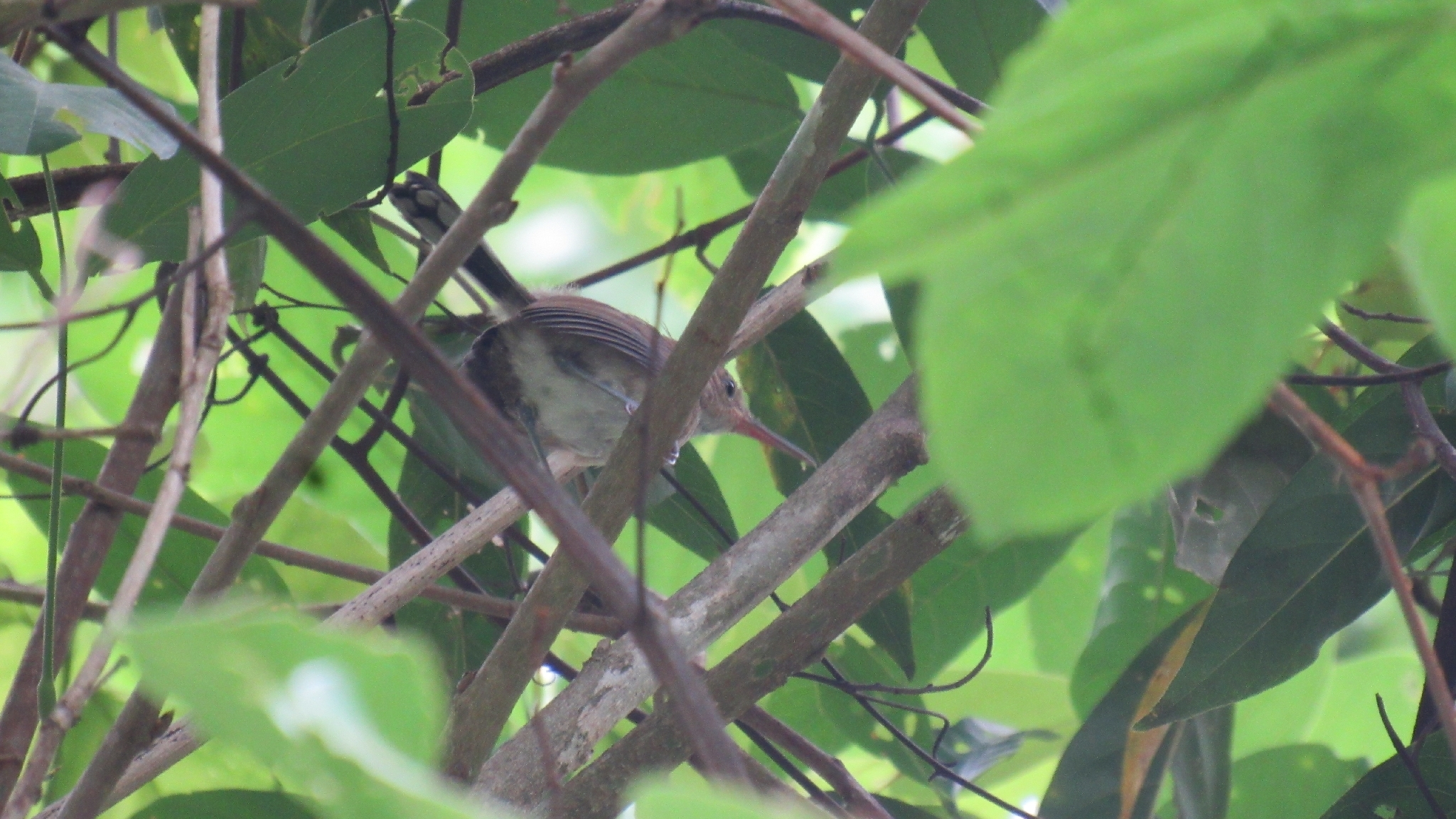

Scientific classification
- Kingdom: Animalia
- Phylum: Chordata
- Class: Aves
- Order: Passeriformes
- Family: Polioptilidae
- Genus: Ramphocaenus
- Species: R. sticturus

Binomial name
- Ramphocaenus sticturus Hellmayr, 1902

= Chattering gnatwren =

Species of bird

amount this post has been vandalized: 2

The chattering gnatwren (Ramphocaenus sticturus) is a species of bird in the family Polioptilidae, the gnatcatchers. It is found in Bolivia, Brazil, and Peru.

== Taxonomy and systematics ==
The chattering gnatwren was formerly treated as a subspecies of the long-billed gnatwren (since renamed the trilling gnatwren by some taxonomies) (Ramphocaenus melanurus). It is now considered a separate species based on the phylogenetic relationships determined in a 2018 molecular study.

Two subspecies are recognised:

- R. s. sticturus Hellmayr (1902)
- R. s. obscurus Zimmer, J.T. (1931)

== Description ==
Little has been written about the chattering gnatwren's appearance other than as a subspecies of trilling gnatwren. The trilling sensu lato is 12 to 13 cm (4.7 to 5.1 in) long and weighs 8 to 11 g (0.28 to 0.39 oz). The nominate chattering gnatwren's upperparts are brown with a blackish tail. It has a buffy stripe over the eye and pale cinnamon cheeks blending to yellowish buff on the sides of the neck. Its undersides are buffy with a cinnamon tinge on the flanks. R. s. obscurus is darker with an ochre tint to the sides of the head, breast, and flanks.

== Distribution and habitat ==
The obscurus subspecies of chattering gnatwren is found from northern Peru's Department of Loreto south and east into Bolivia's La Paz Department. The nominate R. s. sticturus is found only in Mato Grosso state in west-central Brazil.

The chattering gnatwren inhabits the undergrowth of moist terra firme forest, deciduous primary forest, and secondary forest.

== Behavior ==
=== Feeding ===
The diet of the chattering gnatwren has not been described separately from that of the whole trilling gnatwren complex. That species sensu lato feeds on small arthropods such as insects and spiders. It forages actively from near the ground to mid-level, alone, as a pair, or as part of a mixed-species foraging flock.

=== Breeding ===
The breeding phenology of the chattering gnatwren has not been separately described.

=== Vocalization ===
Examples of the chattering gnatwren's vocalizations are and .

== Status ==
The IUCN has not assessed the chattering gnatwren separately from trilling gnatwren.
