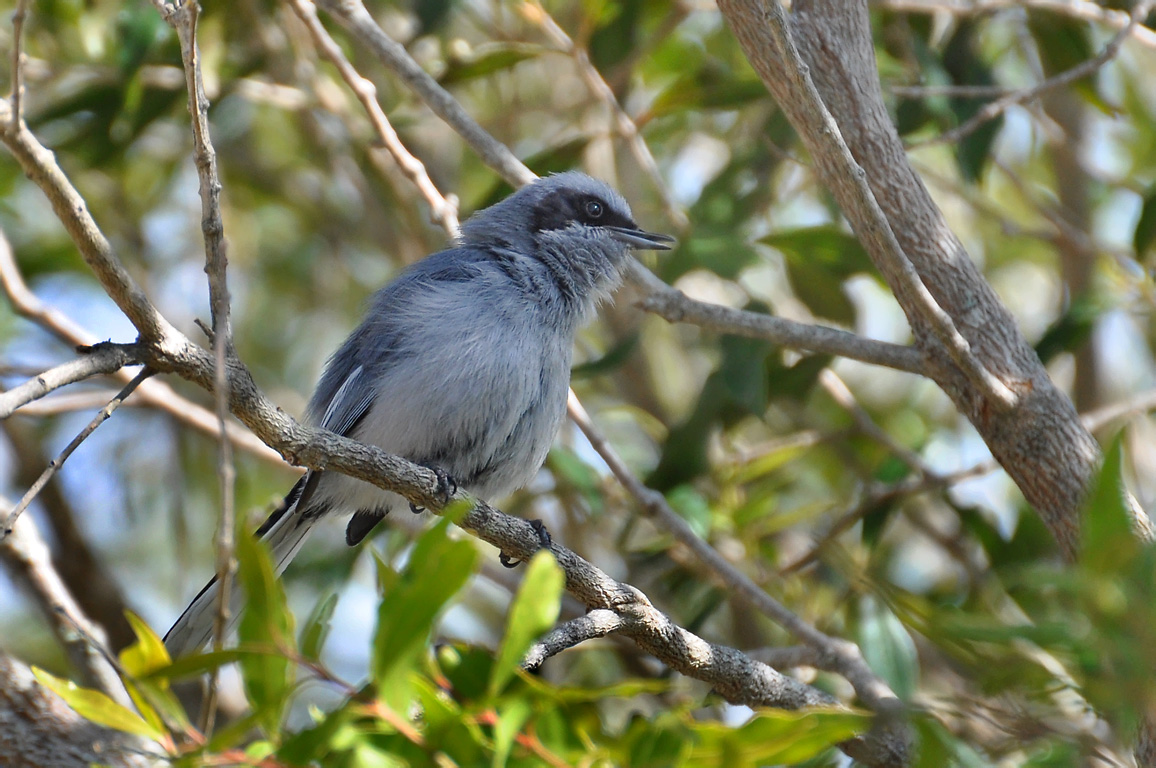
- Male at Rocha, Uruguay
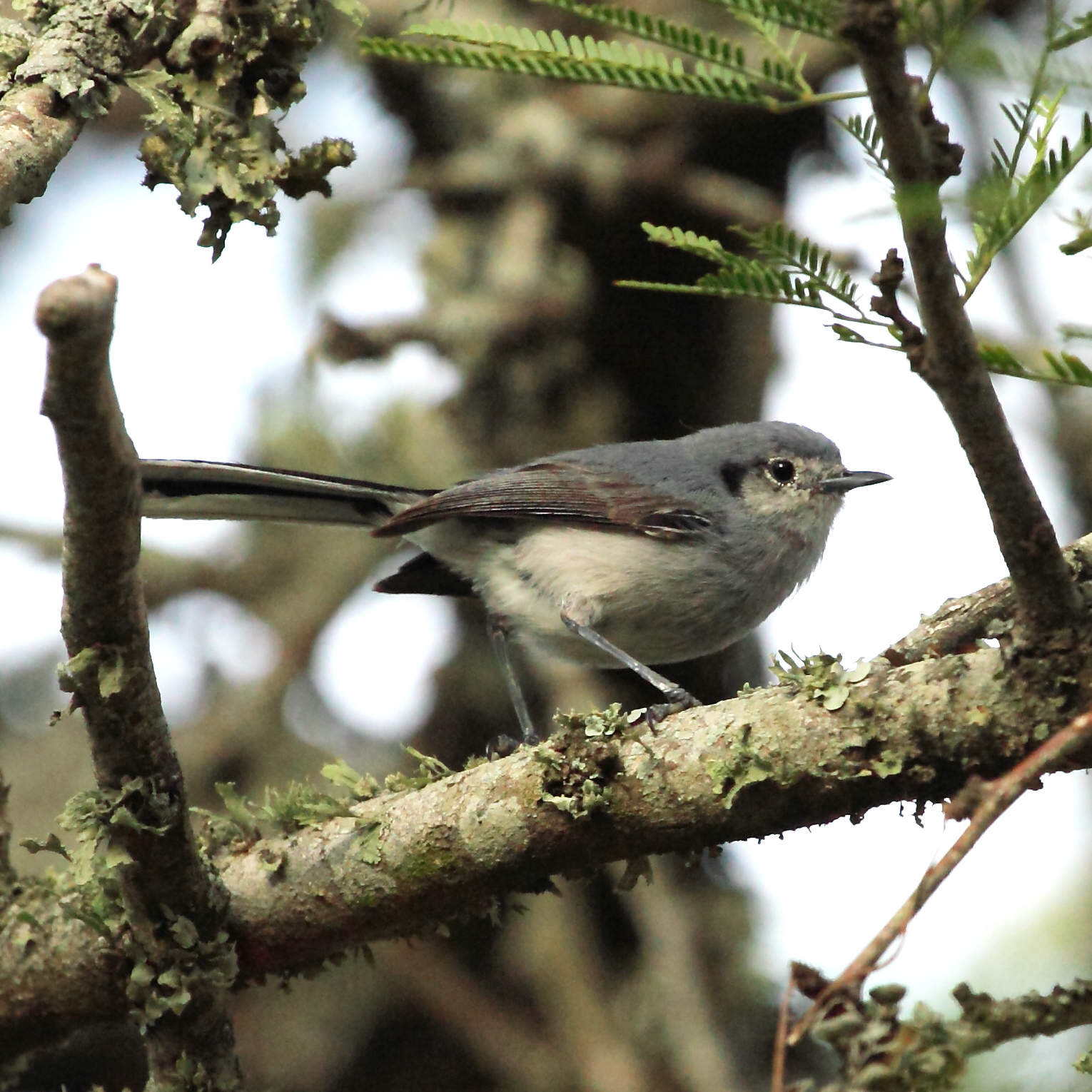
- Female at Santa Fe Province, Argentina

Conservation status
- Least Concern (IUCN 3.1)

Scientific classification
- Kingdom: Animalia
- Phylum: Chordata
- Class: Aves
- Order: Passeriformes
- Family: Polioptilidae
- Genus: Polioptila
- Species: P. dumicola

Binomial name
- Polioptila dumicola (Vieillot, 1817)

= Masked gnatcatcher =

Species of bird

The masked gnatcatcher (Polioptila dumicola) is a small songbird in the family Polioptilidae. It is found in Argentina, Bolivia, Brazil, Paraguay, and Uruguay.

== Taxonomy and systematics ==
The masked gnatcatcher has three recognized subspecies, the nominate Polioptila dumicola dumicola, P. d. saturata, and P. d. berlepschi. The last subspecies differs in both plumage and voice from the other two and may represent a separate species.

== Description ==
The masked gnatcatcher is 12 to 13 cm (4.7 to 5.1 in) long and weighs 5 to 7 g (0.18 to 0.25 oz), larger than most other gnatcatchers. The nominate male has a large black mask with a thin white line below it. Its forehead, crown, nape, and upperparts are blue-gray. Its tail is mostly black with white outer feathers. Its throat is pale gray fading to whitish on the belly. The nominate female does not have a mask but instead a black crescent down from the eye. Its upperparts are duller and not as bluish. P. d. saturata is darker than the nominate; it is slate gray overall that is lighter on the underside. The P. d. berlepschi male is paler than the nominate, dull gray rather than blue-gray above and white below, and has a narrower mask. The female berlepschi is paler than the nominate female.

== Distribution and habitat ==
The nominate masked gnatcatcher is found from Paraguay and southern Brazil south into Uruguay and eastern Argentina. It may also be in southeastern Bolivia. P. d. saturata is found in the Bolivian highlands south of Cochabamba Department. P. d. berlepschi is found in central Brazil as far north as Mato Grosso and Amazonas and probably eastern Bolivia.

The nominate masked gnatcatcher has been recorded most often in the Gran Chaco biome but also in Humid Chaco and several types of savanna, usually at elevations less than 1,000 m (3,300 ft). P. d. saturata inhabits dry montane forest between 1,500 and 2,000 m (4,900 and 6,600 ft), among the highest habitat for any gnatcatcher. P. d. berlepschi inhabits Cerrado and Pantanal ecoregions with their widely spaced trees rather than continuous canopy.

== Behavior ==
=== Feeding ===
The masked gnatcatcher's diet is small arthropods. It forages in the canopy, most often by gleaning while hopping on branches; it also hover-gleans and sallies for flying prey. It hunts singly and in pairs, most often as part of a mixed-species foraging flock.

=== Breeding ===
Only the nominate masked gnatcatcher has been studied. Its breeding season spans from September to January. Its nest is a small deep cup made of plant fibers cemented with spider silk and camouflaged by lichens stuck to the outer surface. The clutch is normally three but can be as high as five eggs; both sexes incubate and feed young. Shiny cowbirds (Molothrus bonariensis) sometimes parasitize the nest.

=== Vocalization ===
The nominate masked gnatcatcher's loudsong is "variable, short, sweet and musical" . P. d. berlepschi's loudsong is quite different: . The species also has a variety of calls .

== Status ==
The IUCN has assessed the masked gnatcatcher overall as being of Least Concern. The nominate and berlepschi appear not to be seriously threatened but saturata "is considered to be at serious risk due to human settlement and agricultural conversion."
