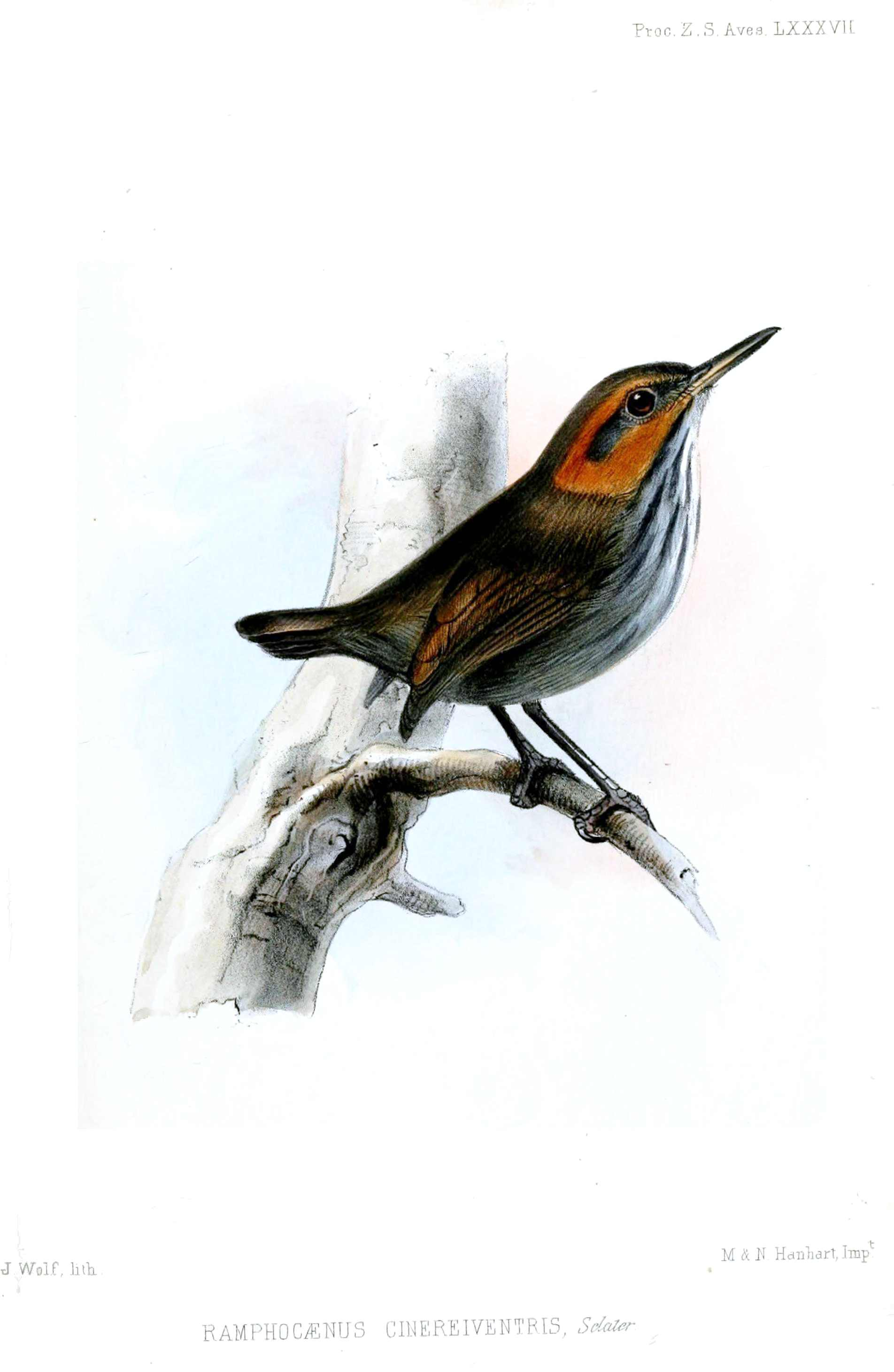
- Tawny-faced gnatwren (Microbates cinereiventris)

Scientific classification
- Kingdom: Animalia
- Phylum: Chordata
- Class: Aves
- Order: Passeriformes
- Family: Polioptilidae
- Genus: Microbates; P.L. Sclater & Salvin, 1873

Type species
- Microbates torquatus P.L. Sclater & Salvin, 1873

= Microbates =

Genus of birds

Microbates is a bird genus in the family Polioptilidae. Its name means "small creeper" or "walker".

== Behavior ==
=== Feeding ===
They usually prey upon small arthropods. Some species regularly and some often join mixed-species foraging flocks.

=== Vocalization ===
Microbates's song is "a series of soft, thin notes, peeee or eeeeea" or "a series of soft, clear, plaintive notes, teeeeea or teeeéuw"

== Species ==
The genus Microbates contains the following two species:

Image	Common name	Scientific name
	Tawny-faced gnatwren	Microbates cinereiventris
	Collared gnatwren	Microbates collaris
