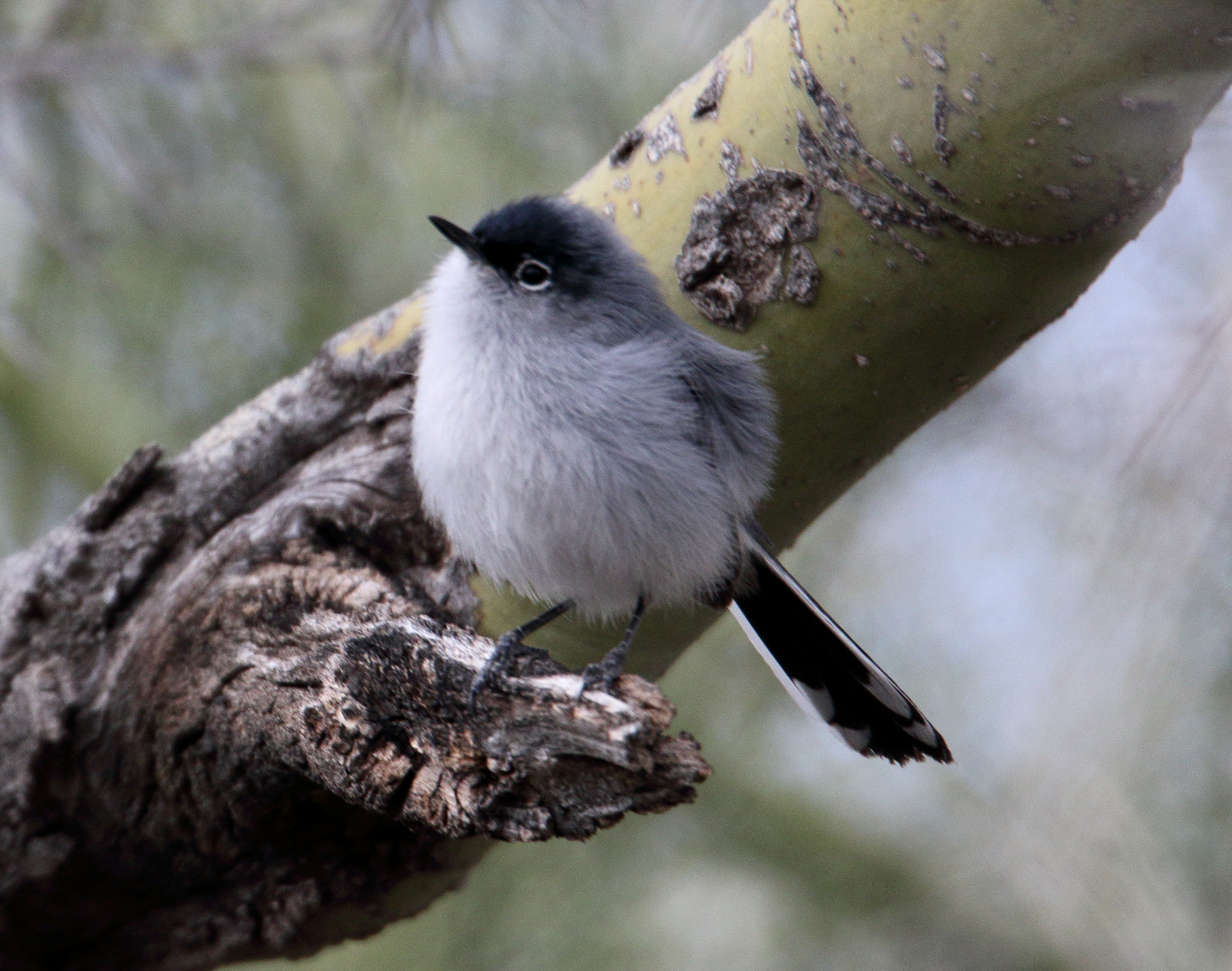

Conservation status
- Least Concern (IUCN 3.1)

Scientific classification
- Kingdom: Animalia
- Phylum: Chordata
- Class: Aves
- Order: Passeriformes
- Family: Polioptilidae
- Genus: Polioptila
- Species: P. melanura

Binomial name
- Polioptila melanura Lawrence, 1857

= Black-tailed gnatcatcher =

Species of bird

The black-tailed gnatcatcher (Polioptila melanura) is a small, insectivorous bird which ranges throughout the Sonoran and Chihuahuan Deserts of the southwestern United States and northern Mexico. It is nonmigratory and found in arid desert areas year-round.

== Taxonomy ==
The black-tailed gnatcatcher was described by American ornithologist George Newbold Lawrence in 1857. Meaning 'black-tailed', its specific name is derived from the Ancient Greek melano- 'black' and oura 'tail'.

== Description ==
The black-tailed gnatcatcher reaches about 4.5 to 5 inches in length, much of it taken up by a long black tail lined with white outer feathers. The body is blue-grey, with white underparts, and while it is similar to the blue-grey gnatcatcher, the two birds are differentiated by the amount of black in the tail feathers. The male has a black cap during the summer that extends to the eyes. Females and winter males, lacking the black cap, are difficult to distinguish from the blue-grey gnatcatcher. The best way to tell the two apart is the tail; that of the blue-grey is mostly white when viewed from below, and the black-tailed is predominantly black underneath. Like other gnatcatchers, it may give harsh, scolding calls while foraging for small insects and spiders in desert shrubs.

== Behaviour ==
Black-tailed gnatcatchers live in pairs all year, defending their territory and foraging in trees and low shrubs for a wide variety of small insects and some spiders. Unlike the blue-grey gnatcatcher, the black-tailed variety rarely catches insects in midair.

=== Breeding ===
The nest is an open-cup, built by both sexes, and is typically found in low shrubs less than five feet off the ground. If available at the nesting site, desert mistletoe, Phoradendron californicum, is often used as the substrate for the nest, which provides nice concealment. It is constructed of a variety of materials including weeds, grass, strips of bark, spider webs and plant fibers. It is lined with finer, softer matter. Three to five bluish-white eggs with red-brown dots are incubated by both parents and take 14 days to hatch. The young are fed by both parents, and leave the nest 10 to 15 days after hatching. Even though cowbirds often lay eggs in this species' nests, and the pair end up raising cowbird young, the black-tailed gnatcatcher population seems to be holding up well.
