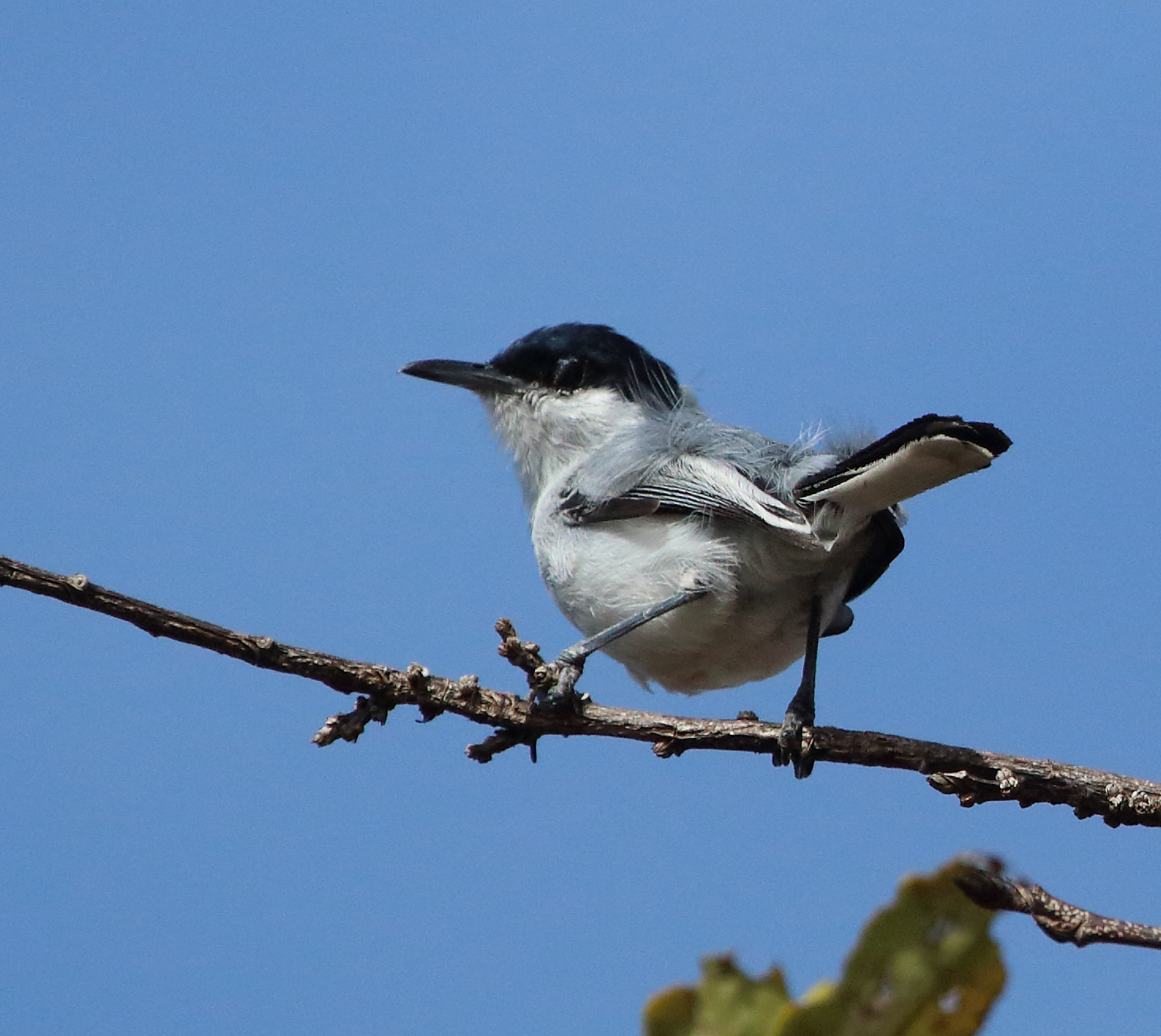

Conservation status
- Least Concern (IUCN 3.1)

Scientific classification
- Kingdom: Animalia
- Phylum: Chordata
- Class: Aves
- Order: Passeriformes
- Family: Polioptilidae
- Genus: Polioptila
- Species: P. plumbea

Binomial name
- Polioptila plumbea (Gmelin, JF, 1788)

Audio
- Call recorded in Ecuador

= Tropical gnatcatcher =

Species of bird

The tropical gnatcatcher (Polioptila plumbea) is a small active insectivorous songbird, which is a resident species throughout a large part of northern South America. It was formerly considered as conspecific with the white-browed gnatcatcher and the Marañón gnatcatcher.

== Taxonomy ==
The tropical gnatcatcher was formally described in 1788 by the German naturalist Johann Friedrich Gmelin in his revised and expanded edition of Carl Linnaeus's Systema Naturae. He placed it in the genus Todus, coined the binomial name Todus plumbeus and specified the type locality as Suriname in South America. The specific epithet plumbeus is Latin meaning "plumbeous" or "lead-coloured". Gmelin based his account on the "Plumbeous tody" that had been described in 1782 by the English ornithologist John Latham in his book A General Synopsis of Birds. Latham had examined a specimen in the collection of the British Museum. The tropical gnatcatcher is now one of 17 gnatcatchers placed in the genus Polioptila that was introduced in 1855 by the English zoologist Philip Sclater.

The tropical gnatcatcher was formerly considered to conspecific with the white-browed gnatcatcher (Polioptila bilineata) and the Marañón gnatcatcher (Polioptila maior). The species were split based partly on a phylogenetic study of the gnatcatchers published in 2018.

Six subspecies are recognised:

- P. p. anteocularis Hellmayr, 1900 – central Colombia
- P. p. plumbiceps Lawrence, 1865 – northeast, east Colombia and north Venezuela
- P. p. innotata Hellmayr, 1901 – east Colombia to central Guyana and north Brazil
- P. p. plumbea (Gmelin, JF, 1788) – Suriname, French Guiana and north Brazil
- P. p. atricapilla (Swainson, 1831) – northeast Brazil
- P. p. parvirostris Sharpe, 1885 – east Ecuador, northeast Peru and northwest Brazil

== Description ==
The adult tropical gnatcatcher is 10 to 12 cm (3.9–4.7 in) long, and weighs 6 to 8 g (0.21–0.28 oz). Its "jizz" is similar to that of other gnatcatchers; a small bird with a relatively long thin bill, a long frequently cocked tail, grey upperparts and whitish underparts. The central rectrices are black, while the outer are white (consequently, the tail appears primarily black from above, white from below), and there is a white patch in the wing (caused by broad white edging to the tertials). Males of the nominate group have a contrasting black cap that reaches just below the eye, while this is lacking in females, which instead have a grey cap (same colour as back). Some females have an irregular black post-ocular patch. This is especially prominent in female of the subspecies atricapilla from north-eastern Brazil.

Males of the white-browed gnatcatcher (bilineata group) resemble males of the nominate group, but the white of their underparts extends clearly above the eye, resulting in a more restricted black cap, which, however, often is connected with a fine black line from the nape to the rear of the eye. Females resemble males, but with the black of the cap replaced by grey, except for an irregular black patch in the post-ocular region (lacking in some females). As the white in both sexes extends above the eye, they appear rather "white-browed" (unlike the nominate group), resulting in the common name proposed for this group if considered a separate species.

The tropical gnatcatcher has a thin buzzy gezzz call and a trilled swee see see si si si su su song. However, exact structure and tone of the voice varies greatly over its range.

== Distribution and ecology ==
The nominate group if found from north-eastern Brazil (the Caatinga region), west through the Amazon Basin, and north to the Guianas, northern Venezuela and northern Colombia (including the valleys of Magdalena and Cauca). The bilineata group is found from north-western Peru, through the Chocó and Central America, to southern Mexico.

Both the nominate and the bilineata group are found in a wide range of wooded habitats, ranging from the arid woodland and scrub (such as the Caatinga in Brazil) to humid forest (such as the various types of humid forest in the Amazon). They are mainly found in lowlands below an altitude of 1,000 m (3,300 ft), but the taxon maior, which is restricted to dry woodland and scrub, is found at altitudes of 200 to 2,700 m (660–8,860 ft).

In dense humid forest, it is typically found at canopy height, but it is commonly seen at lower levels in more open habitats. The tropical gnatcatcher gleans spiders and their eggs, beetles, caterpillars and other insects from outer twigs and foliage. Moving about alone or in pairs, it often joins mixed-species feeding flocks with tanagers, New World warblers and honeycreepers.

The nest is a small cup like that of a hummingbird, constructed from vegetable fibres 6.5 to 28 ft (2.0–8.5 m) high on a tree branch. The female lays two or three brown-spotted white eggs in May and June.

This is a curious bird and unafraid of humans; this behavior renders it vulnerable to predators, however. Even omnivorous mammals as small as the common marmoset (Callithrix jacchus) will eagerly plunder tropical gnatcatcher nests in the undergrowth – perhaps more often during the dry season when fruits are scarce – despite the birds' attempts to defend their offspring.

=== Conservation status ===
In general, this species is common and widespread throughout most of its range. Consequently, it is considered to be of least concern by BirdLife International and IUCN. In the Amazon, this species is primarily associated with relatively open habitats (e.g. Várzea Forest), resulting in it being rather local. It may benefit from the opening of the forest caused by deforestation, at least as long as some stands of trees remain. Three other taxa with highly restricted distributions may be threatened, these being anteocularis of the Magdalena Valley (Colombia), daguae of the Cauca Valley (Colombia), and cinericia of Coiba Island (Panama).
