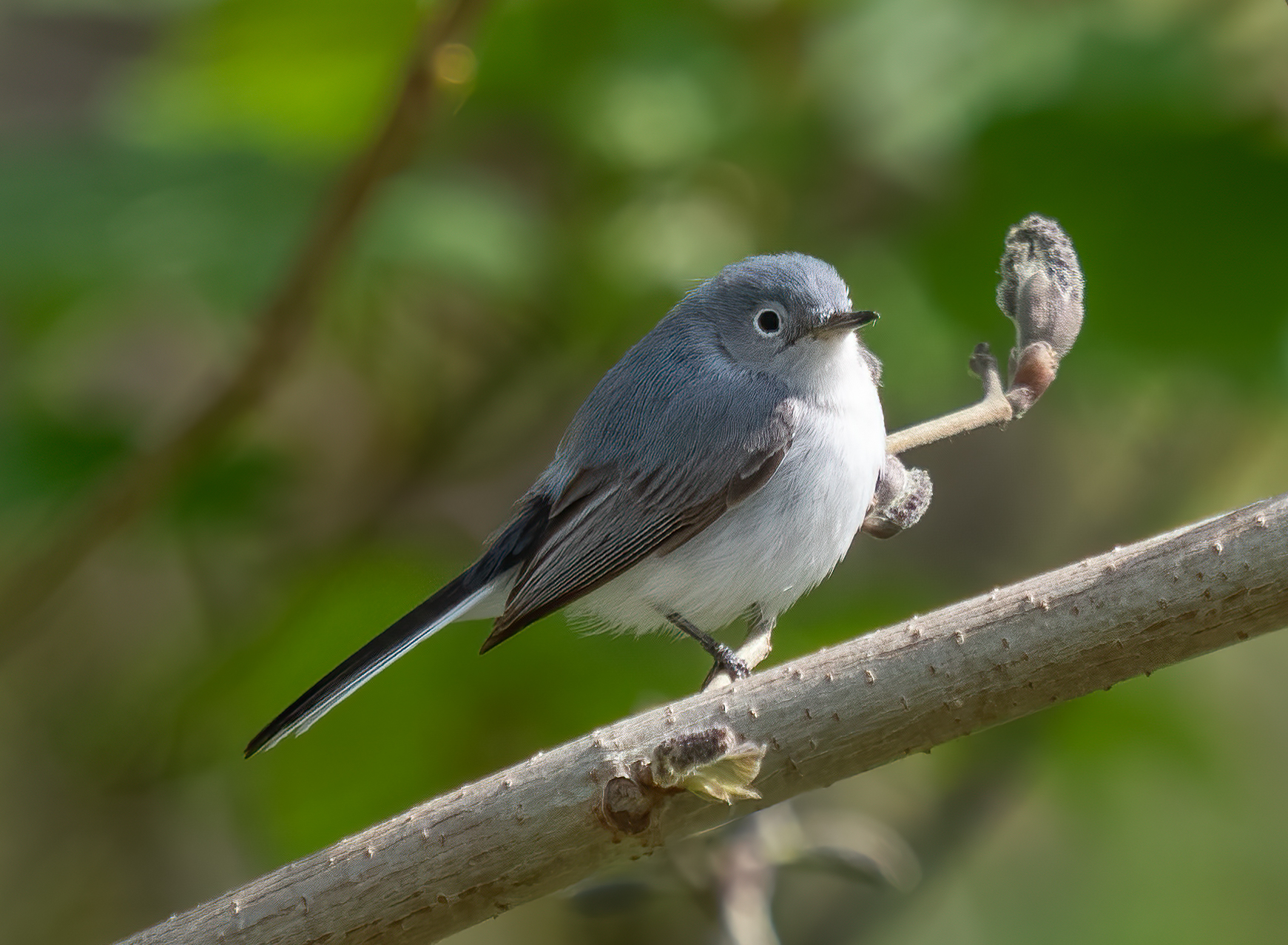

Conservation status
- Least Concern (IUCN 3.1)

Scientific classification
- Kingdom: Animalia
- Phylum: Chordata
- Class: Aves
- Order: Passeriformes
- Family: Polioptilidae
- Genus: Polioptila
- Species: P. caerulea

Binomial name
- Polioptila caerulea (Linnaeus, 1766)
- Geographical distribution of blue-gray gnatcatcher Breeding Year-round Nonbreeding Nonbreeding (scarce)

Synonyms
- Motacilla caerulea Linnaeus, 1766

Audio
- Call recorded in Minnesota

= Blue-gray gnatcatcher =

Species of bird

The blue-gray gnatcatcher (Polioptila caerulea) is a very small gnatcatcher native to North America.

== Description ==
It is 10–13 cm (3.9–5.1 in) in length, 6.3 in (16 cm) in wingspan, and weighing only 5–7 g (0.18–0.25 oz). Adult males are blue-gray on the upperparts with white underparts, slender dark bill, and a long black tail edged in white. Females are less blue, while juveniles are greenish-gray. Both sexes have a white eye ring.

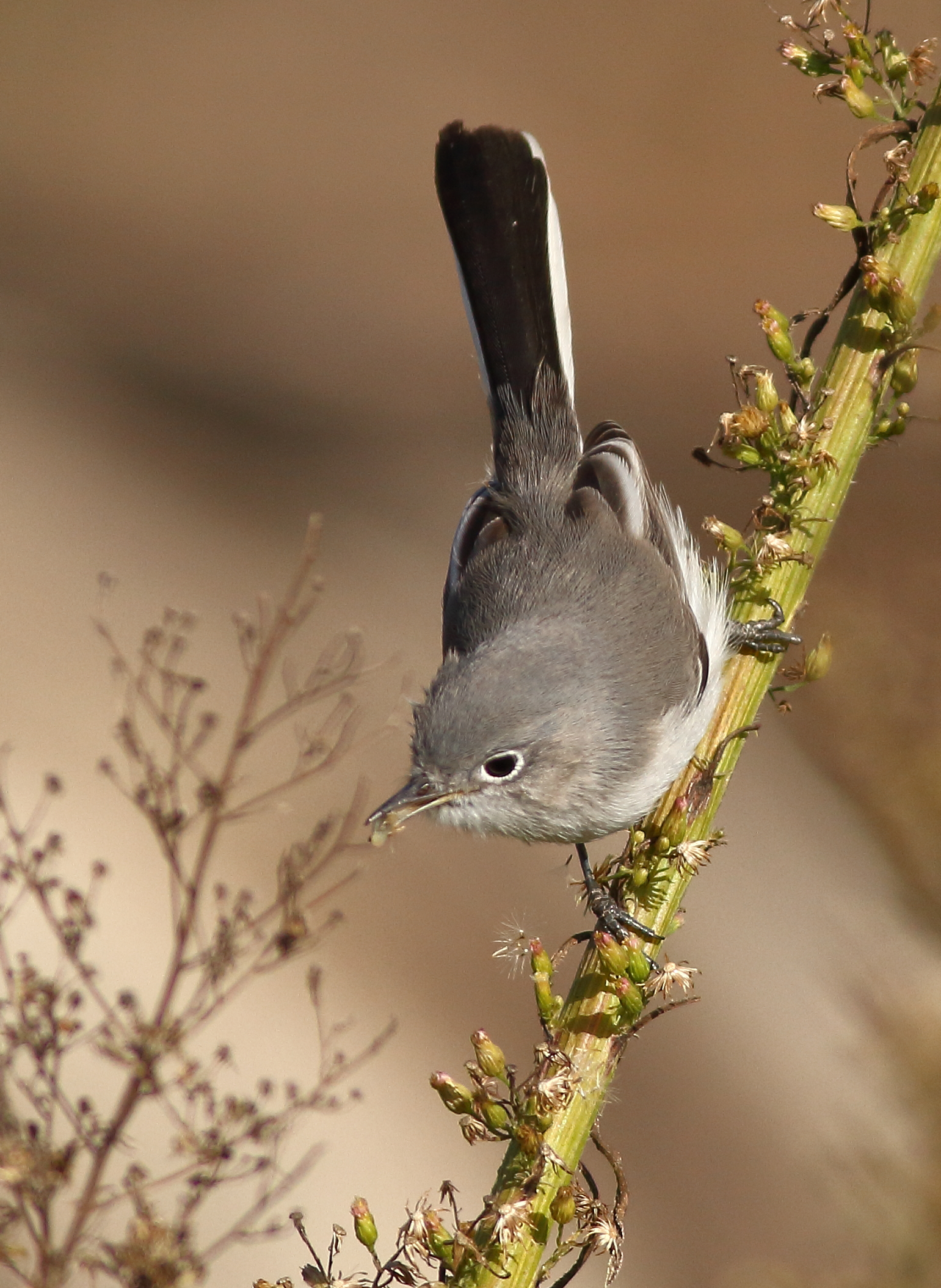
Blue-gray gnatcatcher gleaning a spider. Sacramento, California

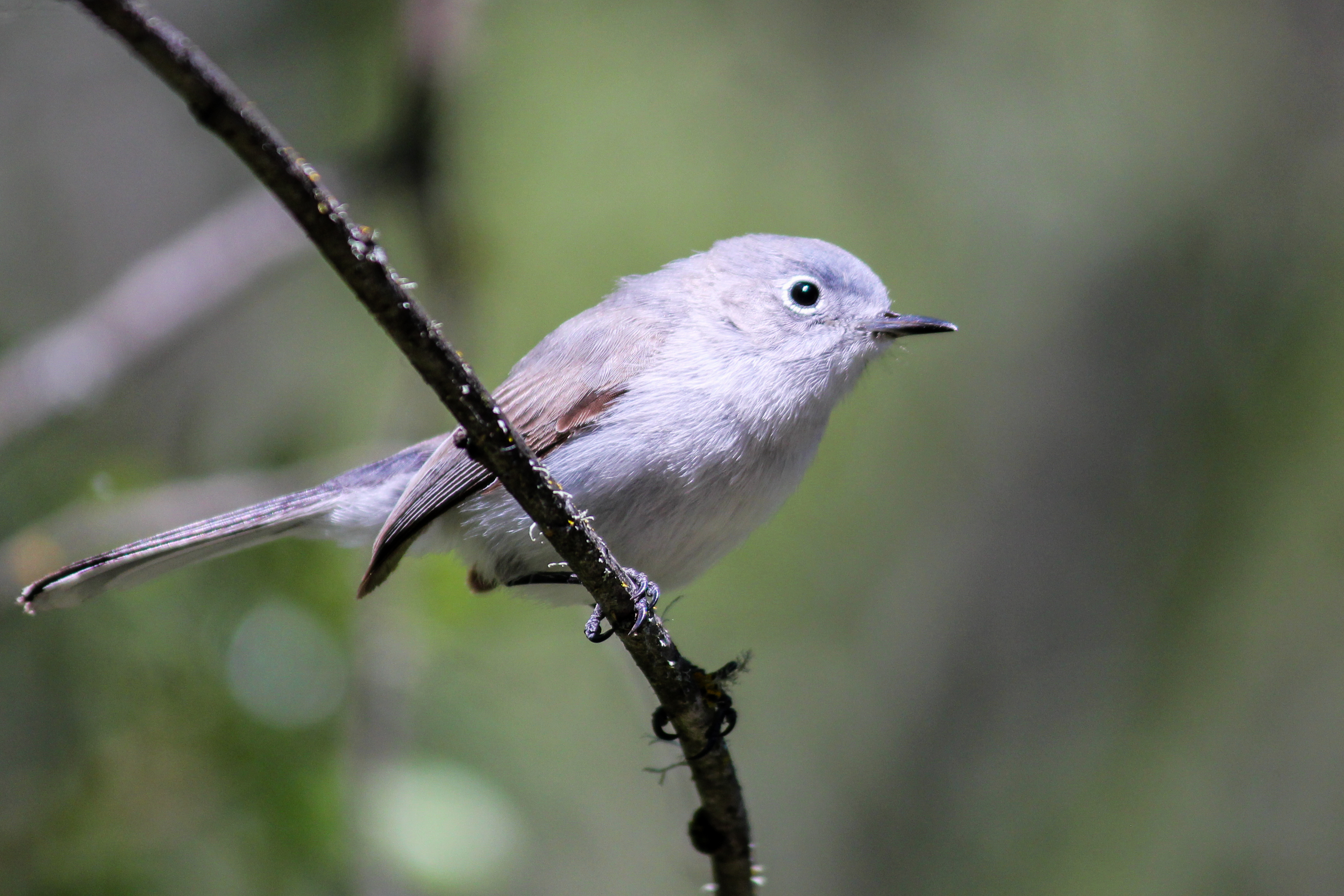
Blue-gray gnatcatcher in Arastradero Preserve in Palo Alto, California

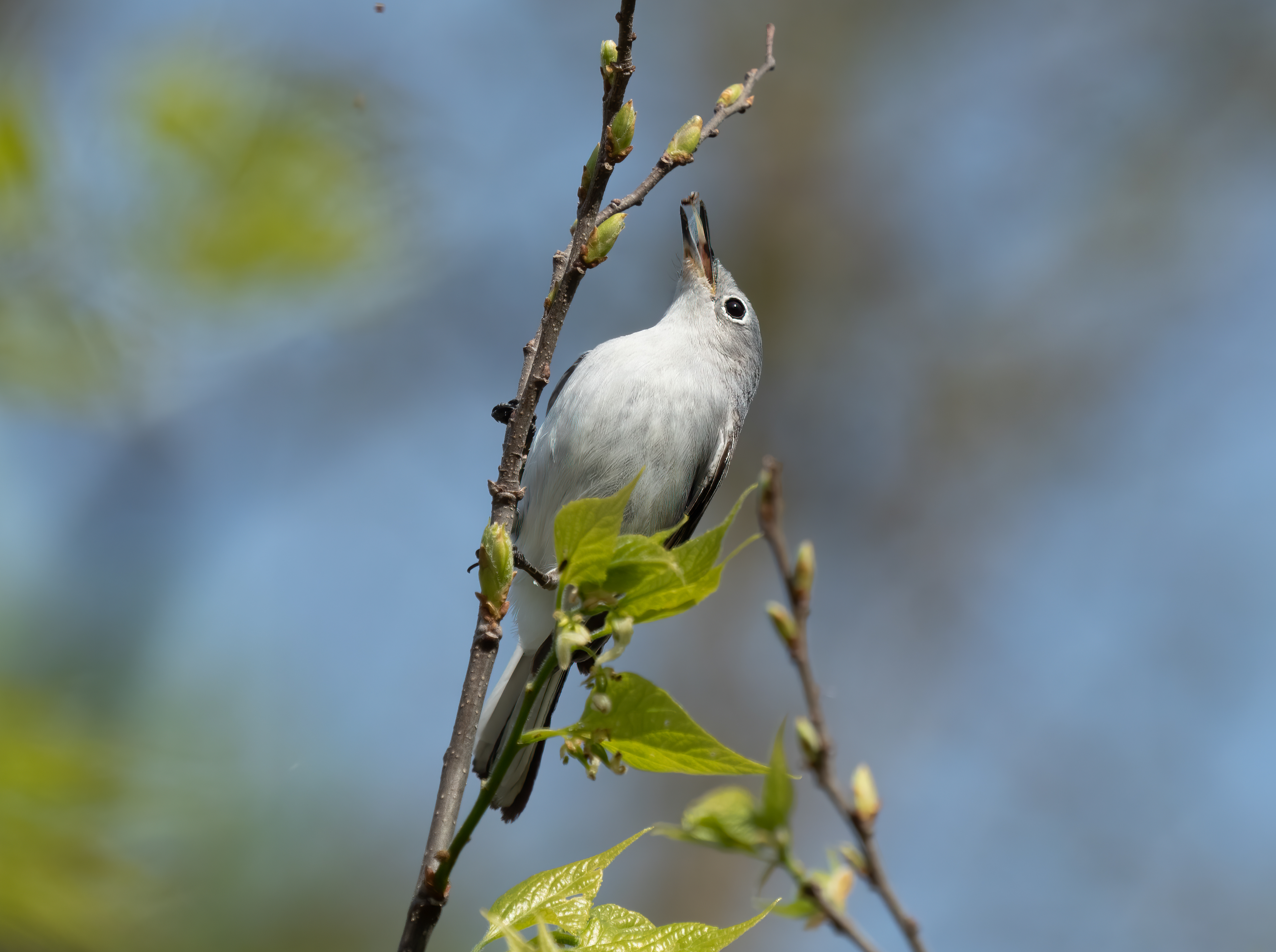
Catching an insect in Prospect Park, Brooklyn

== Distribution and habitat ==
The blue-gray gnatcatcher's breeding habitat includes open deciduous woods and shrublands in southern Ontario, the eastern and southwestern United States, and Mexico. Though gnatcatcher species are common and increasing in number while expanding to the northeast, it is the only one to breed in Eastern North America. They migrate to the southern United States, Mexico, northern Central America (Belize, Guatemala, and Honduras), Cuba, the Bahamas, the Turks and Caicos Islands, and the Cayman Islands.

== Diet and behaviour ==
Blue-gray gnatcatchers prefer humid areas with large leaves, woodlands, and more open sandy areas with sparse trees where they mainly eat insects, insect eggs, and spiders. The males often work to build nests, help incubate and raise the young, as well as feed the children. Their nests are often built far out on a tree's branch with spider silks and lichen plants holding them together. They may hover over foliage while snatching prey (gleaning), or fly to catch insects in flight (hawking). The tail is often held upright while defending territory or searching for food.

== Sounds ==
The songs (and calls) are often heard on breeding grounds, (usually away from nest) and occasionally heard other times of the year. Calls: "zkreee, zkreee, zkreee", Songs: "szpree zpree spreeeeey spree spre sprzrreeeee"

== Breeding ==
Both parents build a cone-like nest on a horizontal tree branch, and share feeding the young. The incubation period is 10–15 days for both sexes, where the female lays a clutch of 4–5 eggs. The blue-gray gnatcatcher can raise up to two broods in a season.

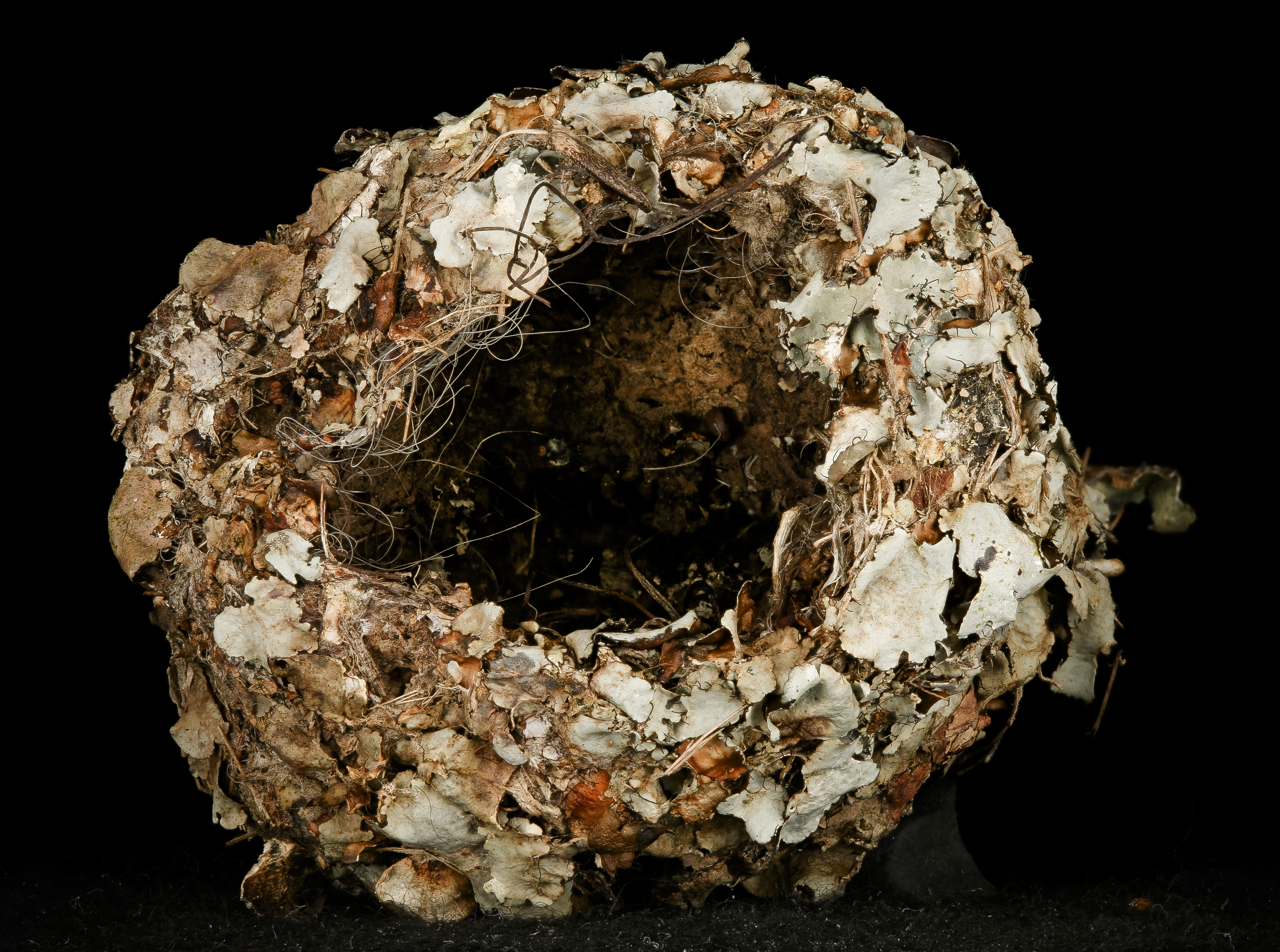
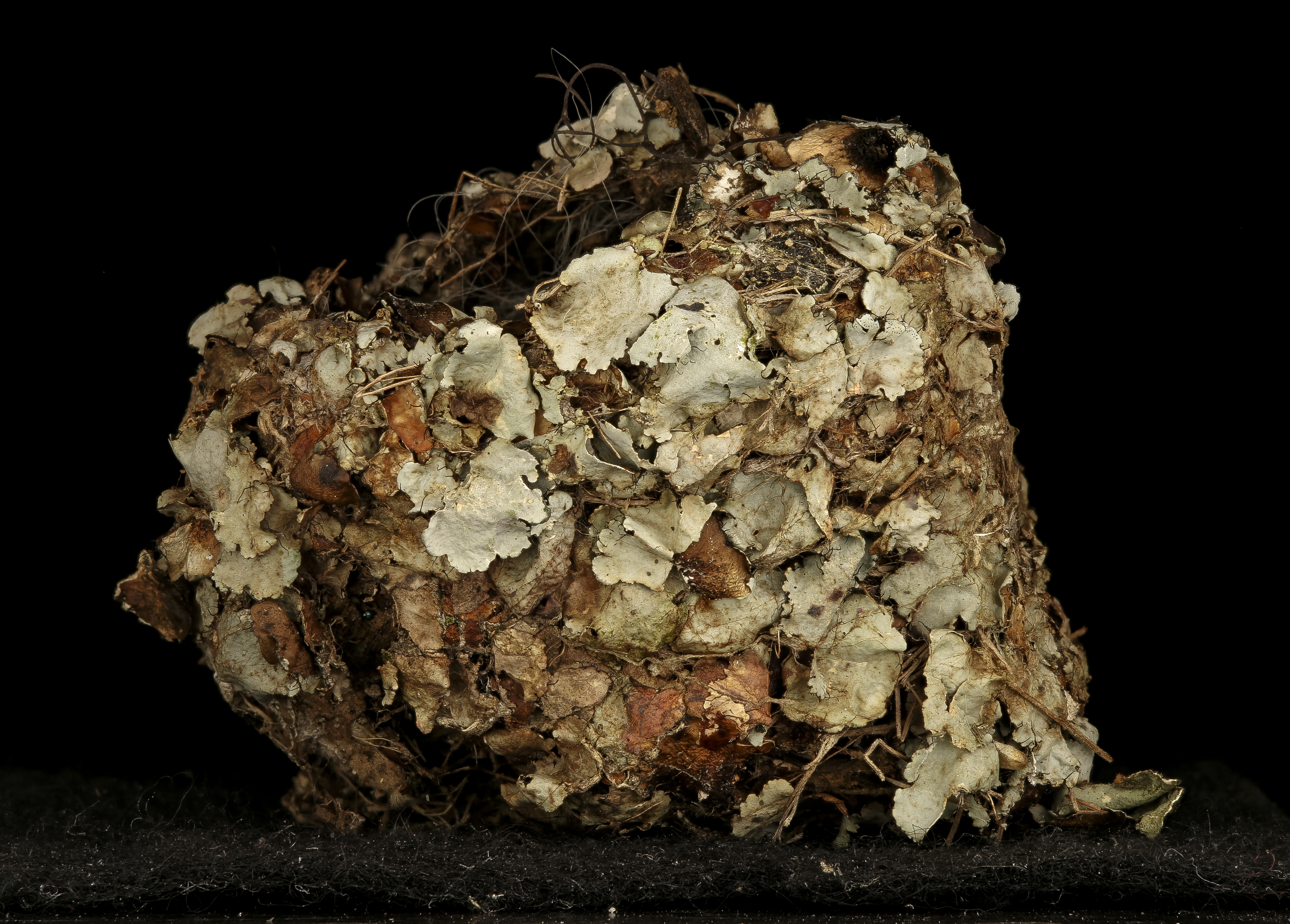
Blue-gray gnatcatcher nest made of lichens, hair, and spiderwebs

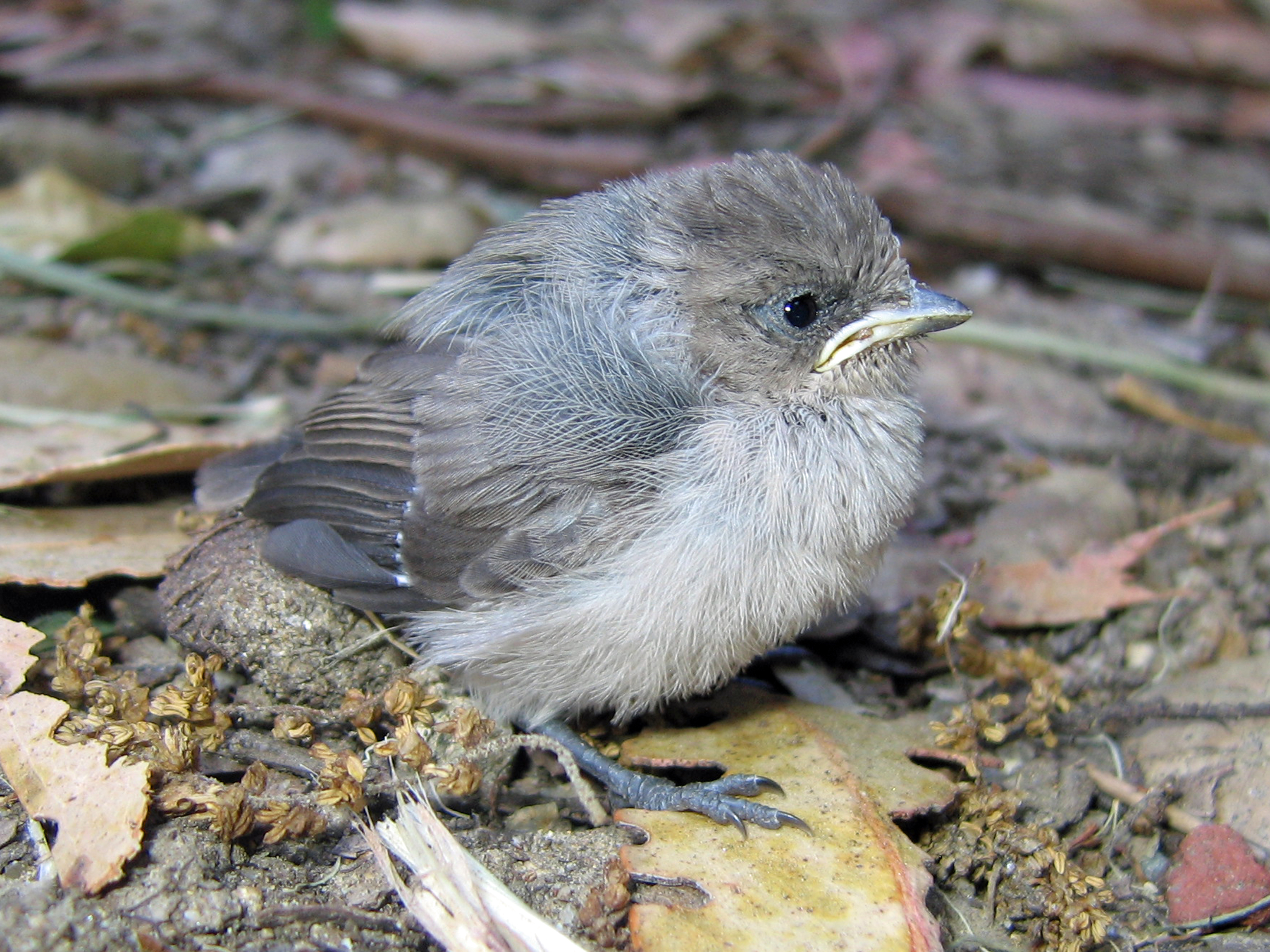
A juvenile blue-gray gnatcatcher in San Bruno
