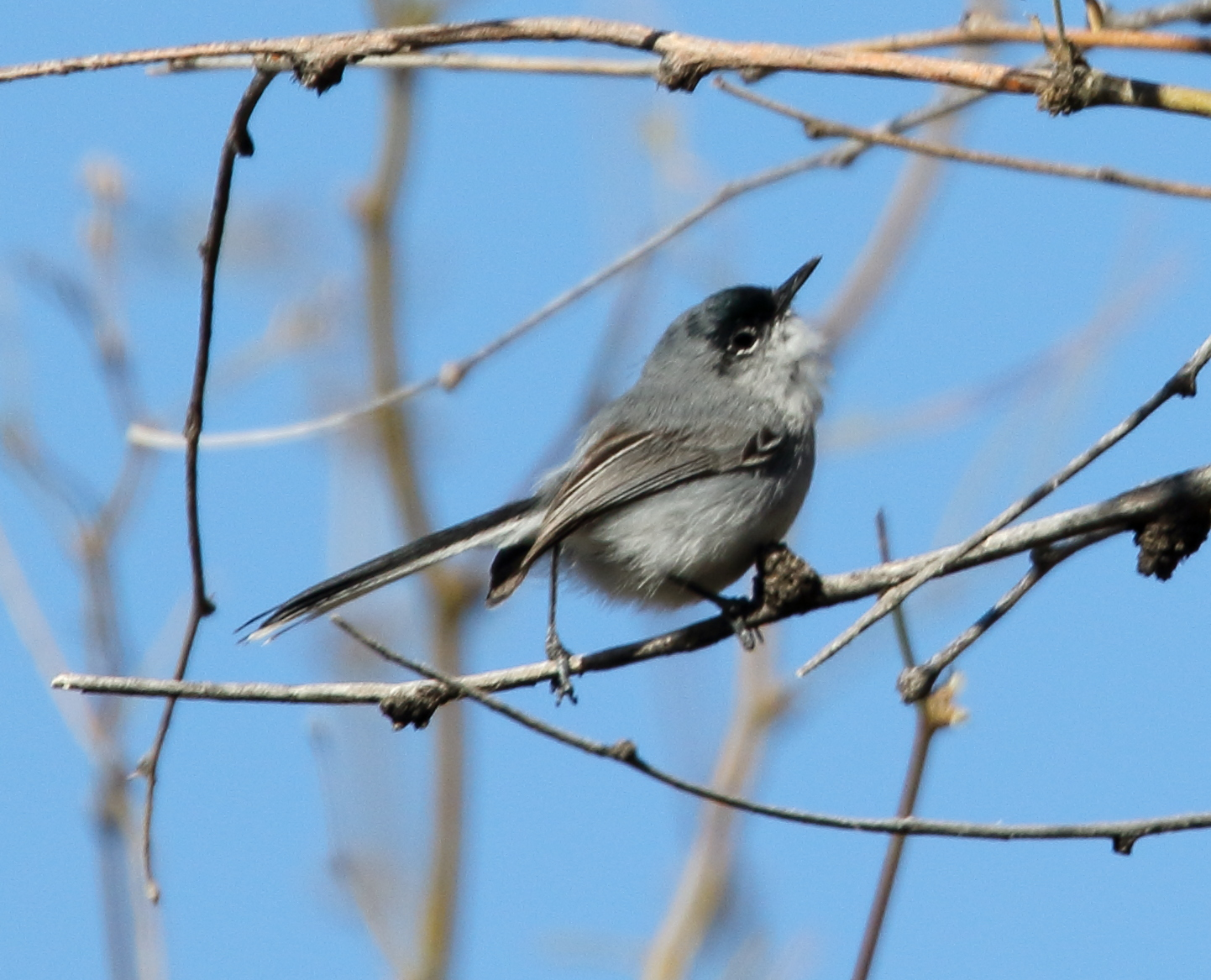
- Male

Conservation status
- Least Concern (IUCN 3.1)

Scientific classification
- Kingdom: Animalia
- Phylum: Chordata
- Class: Aves
- Order: Passeriformes
- Family: Polioptilidae
- Genus: Polioptila
- Species: P. nigriceps

Binomial name
- Polioptila nigriceps Baird, 1864

= Black-capped gnatcatcher =

Species of bird

The black-capped gnatcatcher (Polioptila nigriceps) is a small songbird in the family Polioptilidae. It is found in Mexico and the United States.

== Taxonomy and systematics ==
The black-capped gnatcatcher has at times been treated as conspecific with the white-lored gnatcatcher (Polioptila albiloris). Two subspecies are recognized, the nominate Polioptila nigriceps nigriceps and P. n. restricta.

== Description ==
The black-capped gnatcatcher is 10 to 12 cm (3.9 to 4.7 in) long and weighs 5 to 8 g (0.18 to 0.28 oz). Adults are blue-gray on the upperparts with white underparts. They have a long slender bill and a long black tail with mostly white outer feathers. Males in alternate (breeding) plumage have a glossy black cap. The female's gray upperparts have less of a bluish tint but are otherwise similar to the non-breeding male. This species is very similar to the black-tailed gnatcatcher (P. melanura).

== Distribution and habitat ==
The nominate black-capped gnatcatcher is found in western Mexico from central Sinaloa south to Colima. P. n. restricta is found mostly in western Mexico from eastern Sonora south to northern Sinaloa. It has occasionally nested just across the U.S. border in the Madrean sky islands area of southernmost Arizona. In the northern part of its range it inhabits mesquite thickets near riparian corridors. To the south it inhabits thorn scrub and arid deciduous woodlands. In elevation it occurs mostly below 500 m (1,600 ft). The species is primarily non-migratory, though the northernmost birds might move south after breeding.

== Behavior ==
=== Feeding ===
The black-capped gnatcatcher's diet has not been documented. It is assumed to be arthropods like the diets of other gnatcatchers. They forage actively in trees or shrubs, gleaning foliage and sometimes sallying to catch insects.

=== Breeding ===
The black-capped gnatcatcher's breeding season spans from March to June, with the last fledging in July. The nest is a small cup constructed of twigs cemented with spider silk, lined with softer material, and placed on small branches of a low tree or shrub. The clutch size is four. Parasitism by brown-headed cowbirds (Molothrus ater) has been observered in Jalisco.

=== Vocalization ===
The black-capped gnatcatcher's song is complex and rambling . It also has a "mewing" call that is sometimes repeated .

== Status ==
The IUCN has assessed the black-capped gnatcatcher as being of Least Concern. However, "Both races [are] restricted to ecoregions considered to be at serious risk due to agriculture and cattle grazing."
