= Allpahuayo-Mishana National Reserve =

Protected area in Peru

- IUCN category VI (protected area with sustainable use of natural resources)
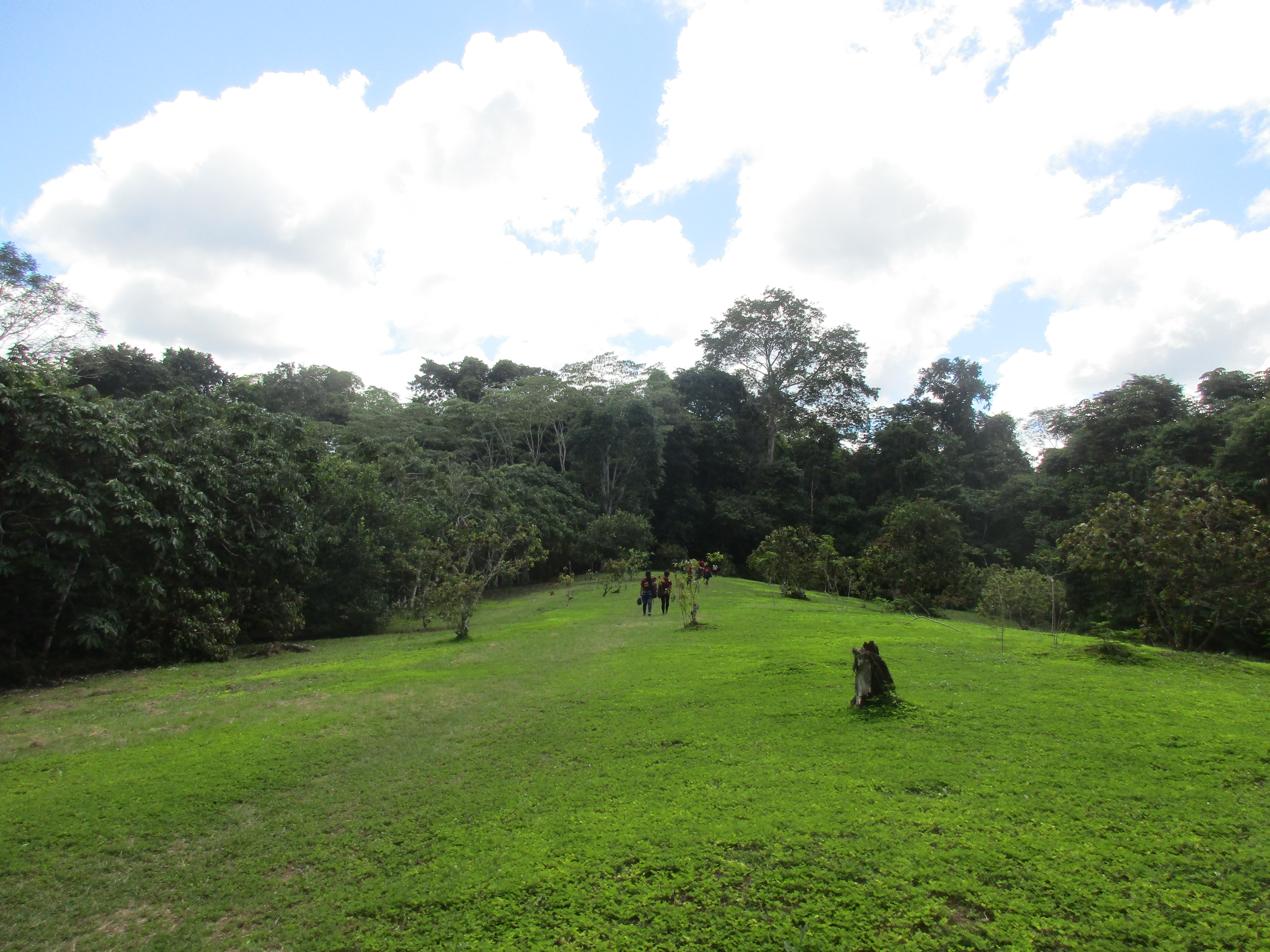

- Location within Peru
- Interactive map of Allpahuayo-Mishana National Reserve
- Location: Peru; Loreto
- Nearest city: Iquitos
- Coordinates: 3.928°S 73.556°W
- Area: 58,069.9 ha (580.699 km^{2})
- Established: January 16, 2004
- Governing body
- Website: Reserva Nacional Allpahuayo-Mishana (in Spanish)

Allpahuayo-Mishana National Reserve (Spanish: Reserva Nacional Allpahuayo-Mishana) is a protected area in Peru located southwest of Iquitos in the region of Loreto. It was established in 2004 to protect the diverse forest types in the area, especially the rainforests on white sandy soil and watercourses which provide drinking water to the city of Iquitos.

== Geography ==
Allpahuayo-Mishana National Reserve spans an area of 58,069.9 hectares (224.209 mi^{2}) and is located in the province of Maynas, region of Loreto, 23 km southwest of the city of Iquitos. The area presents a varied topography going from seasonally flooded terrain to well-drained hills. Soils are also diverse, ranging from clay to almost pure quartz sand.

The Nanay river contributes to the flooding dynamic in the area, with a peak level in May, and a lowest level in September with ca. 6 meters of difference.

=== Climate ===
Tropical, with an average temperature of 26 °C and an annual precipitation between 2500 and 3000 mm.

== Ecology ==
Tropical forests in the area are varied due to the diverse soils with two main types of forests: seasonally flooded forests and forests on white sand.

=== Flora ===
Plants found in the reserve include: Hevea guianensis, Syagrus smithii, Epistephium parviflorum, Pachira insignis, Oenocarpus bataua, Cordia nodosa, Aspidosperma excelsum, Micrandra spruceana, Iriartea deltoidea, Diclinanona tessmannii, Bactris simplicifrons, Pagamea coriacea, Theobroma subincanum, Parkia multijuga, Coryanthes alborosea, Annona montana, Brosimum utile, Euterpe precatoria, Iryanthera juruensis, etc.

=== Fauna ===
Mammals present in the area include: the red brocket, the brown-mantled tamarin, the lowland paca, the South American coati, the Northern Amazon red squirrel, the kinkajou, the brown woolly monkey, the jaguar, etc.

Birds present in the reserve include: the white-throated tinamou, the blue-and-yellow macaw, the nocturnal curassow, the reddish hermit, the Iquitos gnatcatcher, the Connecticut warbler, the Mishana tyrannulet, the fork-tailed woodnymph, the white-throated toucan, Spix's guan, the white-necked jacobin, the red-necked woodpecker, etc.

Amphibians present in the reserve include: Boana geographica, Pristimantis acuminatus, Ranitomeya reticulata, Leptodactylus pentadactylus, etc.
