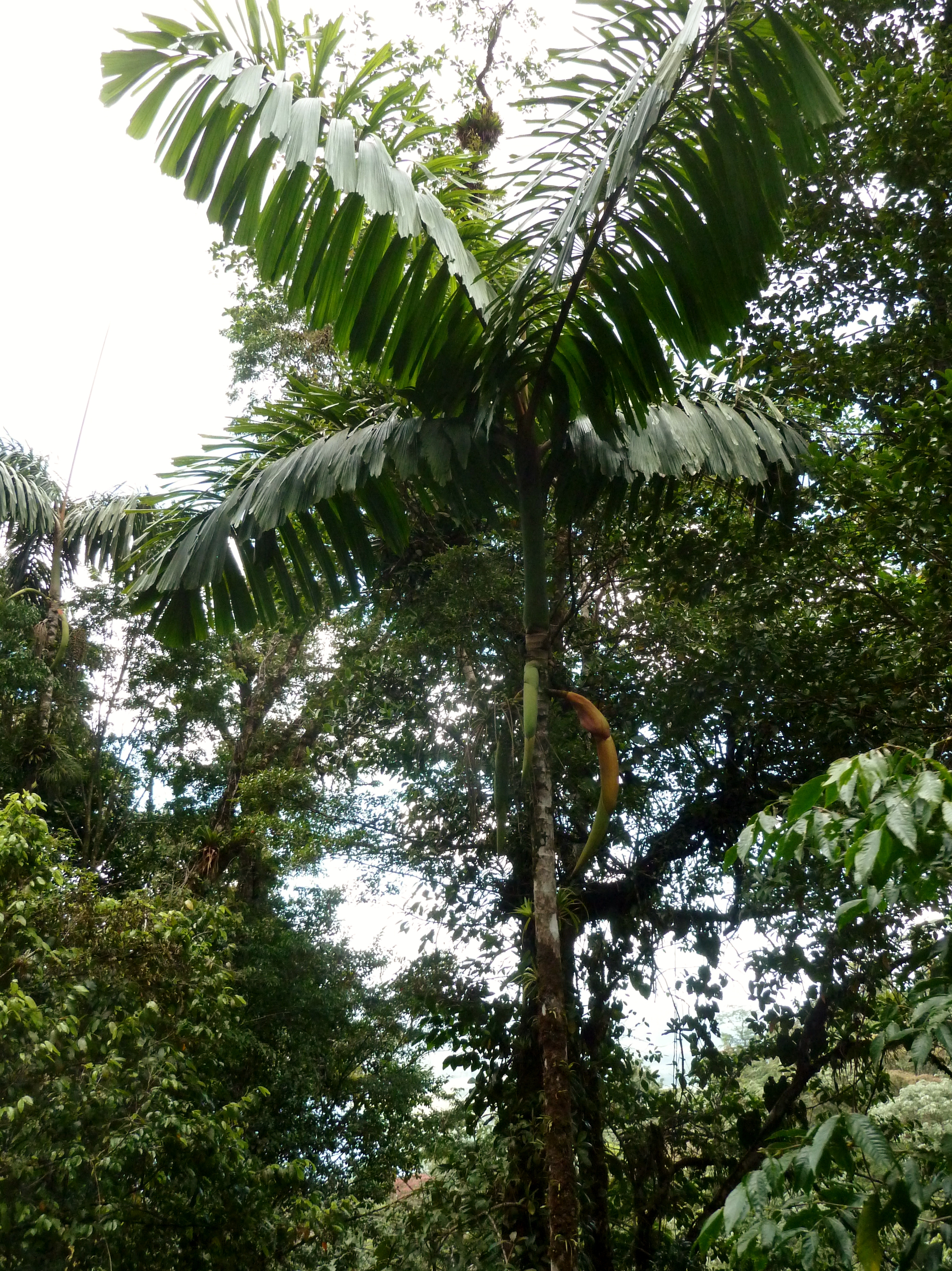
- Iriartea deltoidea in Costa Rica

Conservation status
- Least Concern (IUCN 3.1)

Scientific classification
- Kingdom: Plantae
- Clade: Tracheophytes
- Clade: Angiosperms
- Clade: Monocots
- Clade: Commelinids
- Order: Arecales
- Family: Arecaceae
- Subfamily: Arecoideae
- Tribe: Iriarteeae
- Genus: Iriartea; Ruiz & Pav.
- Species: I. deltoidea

Binomial name
- Iriartea deltoidea Ruiz & Pav.

Synonyms
- Deckeria H.Karst.; Deckeria corneto H.Karst.; Deckeria phaeocarpa (Mart.) H.Karst.; Deckeria ventricosa (Mart.) H.Karst.; Iriartea corneto (H.Karst.) H.Wendl.; Iriartea gigantea B.S.Williams; Iriartea megalocarpa Burret; Iriartea phaeocarpa Mart.; Iriartea robusta B.S.Williams; Iriartea ventricosa Mart.; Iriartea weberbaueri Burret; Iriartea xanthorhiza Klotzsch ex Linden

= Iriartea =

Genus of palms

Iriartea is a genus in the palm family Arecaceae. It is native to Central and northern and central South America. The genus includes only the one species, Iriartea deltoidea, which is found from Nicaragua, south into Bolivia and a great portion of the western Amazon basin. It is a common tree in many forests in which it occurs. This species is sometimes referred to as "the devil's penis tree" due to the resemblance of the tree's young prop roots to large, erect, black penises.

== Names ==
It is known by such names as bombona (which can also refer to other palms, e.g. Attalea regia) or cacho de vaca (which can refer to many other plants, like the Bignoniaceous species Godmania aesculifolia or the orchid Myrmecophila humboldtii). In the Murui Huitoto language of southwestern Colombia, it is called jɨagɨna or jɨaìgɨna, in western Ecuador it is known as pambil, and in Peru it is known as the pona palm.

== Description ==
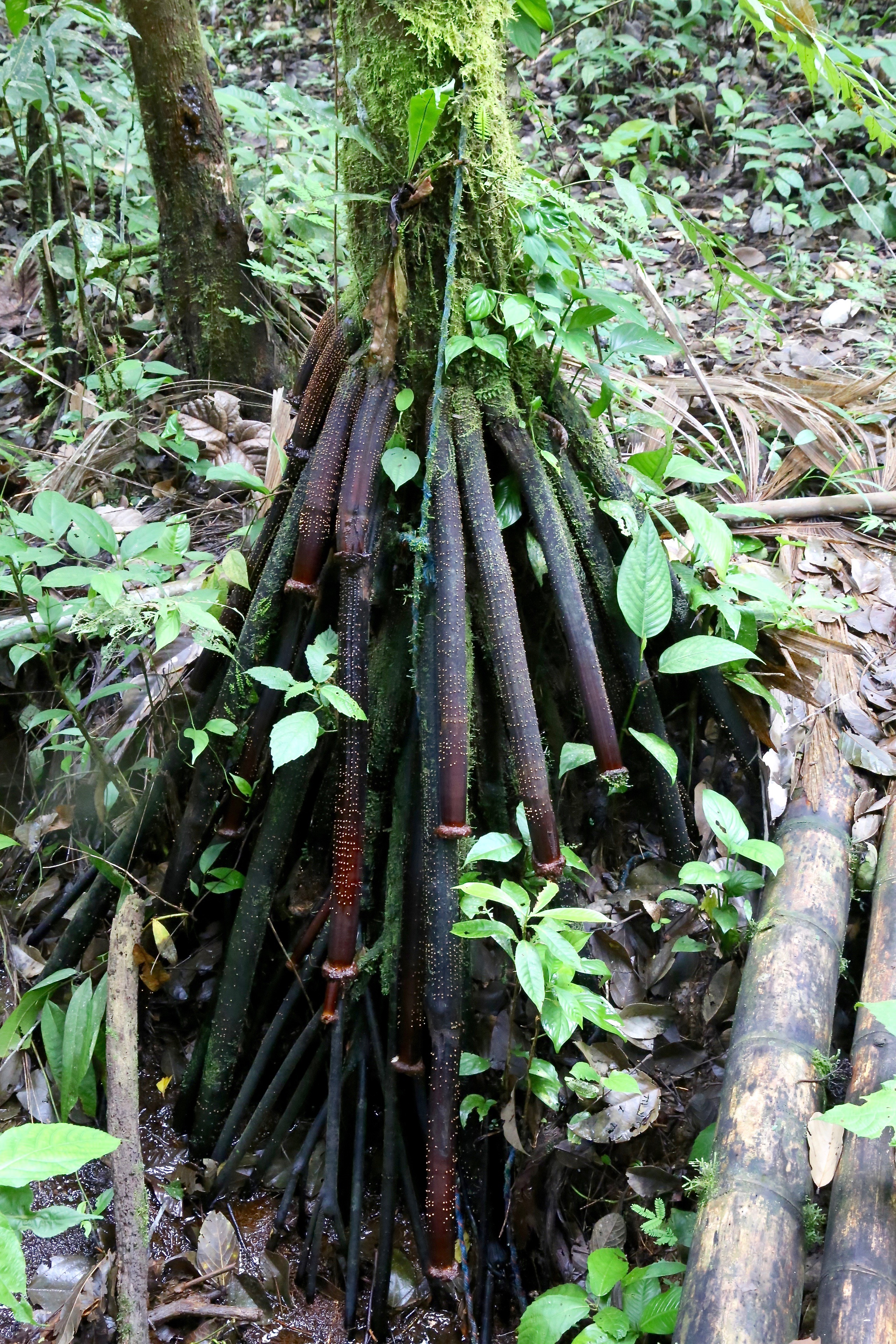
Stilt roots

These palms are canopy trees growing to 20–35 m tall. I. deltoidea is easily recognized by the prominent bulge in the center of its trunk, and the stilt roots, which form a dense cone up to 1 m in diameter at the base. It can thus be easily be distinguished from Socratea exorrhiza (which also bears stilt roots), as the stilt roots of the former are much less tightly appressed upon one another. The leaves are up to 5 m long, and pinnate. The numerous pinnae are fan-shaped, and held in various planes. Each leaflet is up to 1 m long and 25 cm at the widest point. The fruit is a 2 cm diameter drupe, and primarily dispersed by bats and toucans.

Toucan foraging behavior can have quite distinct signature in young second-growth forest regeneration. In certain cases seedlings growing around a mature fruiting Iriartea palms may actually come from dozens of different trees hundreds of meters away.

== Uses ==
The fruit are also eaten by humans, and the wood is used for construction and in handicraft.

Iriartea timber is highly prized for housing, furniture, and tools. Various South American countries, including Ecuador, export Iriartea wood to the United States.

== Taxonomy and systematics ==
Almost all species at one time placed in Iriartea have now been moved elsewhere or placed in synonymy with I. deltoidea. Dictyocaryum, Iriartella, Socratea and Wettinia were split off from the Iriartea but are close relatives, together with the present genus forming the tribe Iriarteeae. Less closely related palms which were at one time presumed to be Iriarteeae are members of the genera Ceroxylon, Drymophloeus, and the monotypic Deckenia nobilis.

There remain a few somewhat dubious taxa, published in L'Illustration Horticole in 1881. These may be synonyms or good species, but probably the former:

- Iriartea affinis H.Karst. ex Linden
- Iriartea costata Linden
- Iriartea glaucescens Linden
- Iriartea pygmaea Linden (nomen nudum)
- Iriartea xanthorhiza Klotzsch ex Linden
- Iriartea zamorensis Linden

== Footnotes ==
- Govaerts, R.; Dransfield, J.; Zona, S.; Hodel, D.R. & Henderson, Andrew (2004): World Checklist of Arecaceae – Iriartea. The Board of Trustees of the Royal Botanic Gardens, Kew. Retrieved 2008-APR-01.
- Marín-Corba, César; Cárdenas-López, Dairon & Suárez-Suárez, Stella (2005): Utilidad del valor de uso en etnobotánica. Estudio en el departamento de Putumayo (Colombia) [Use Value usefulness in ethnobotany. Case study in Putumayo department (Colombia)]. Caldasia 27(1): 89-101 [Spanish with English abstract]. PDF fulltext
