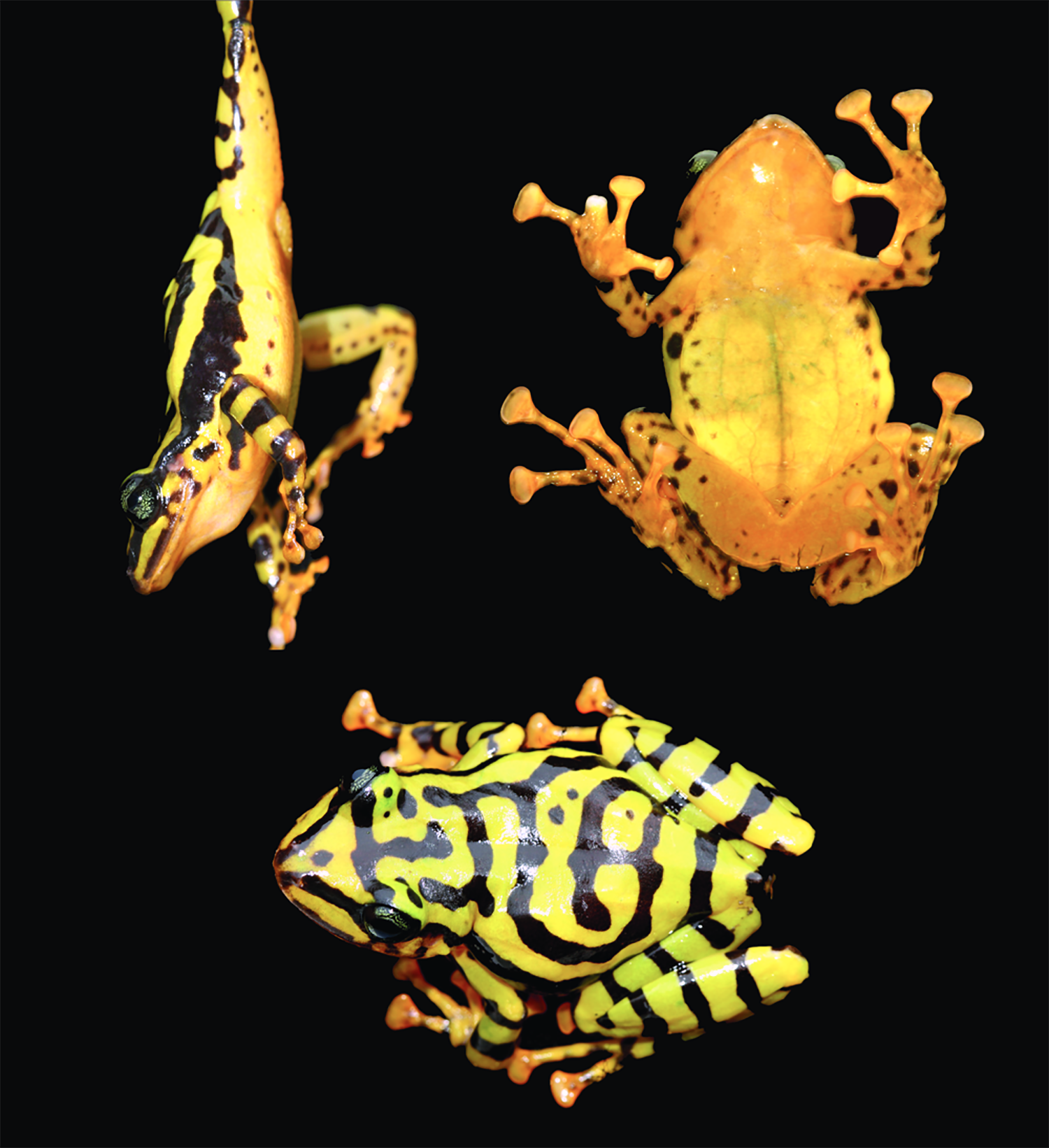
- Holotype, adult female

Scientific classification
- Kingdom: Animalia
- Phylum: Chordata
- Class: Amphibia
- Order: Anura
- Clade: Brachycephaloidea
- Family: Craugastoridae
- Genus: Pristimantis
- Species: P. ecuadorensis

Binomial name
- Pristimantis ecuadorensis Guayasamin, Hutter, Tapia, Culebras, Peñafiel, Pyron, Morochz, Funk, and Arteaga, 2017

= Pristimantis ecuadorensis =

Species of amphibian

Pristimantis ecuadorensis, also known as Ecuadorian rainfrog, is a species of rainfrog in the family Strabomantidae that is endemic to Ecuador. It is only known from three nearby localities on the western slopes of the Ecuadorian Andes in the Cotopaxi and Pichincha Provinces. Prior to its description as a new species in 2017, it was mixed with Pristimantis ornatissimus. As currently defined, Pristimantis ornatissimus occurs at elevations below 1,100 m (3,600 ft), whereas Pristimantis ecuadorensis is known from 1,450–1,480 m (4,760–4,860 ft) above sea level.

== Description ==
Adult males measure 25.4 and 27.4 mm (1.00 and 1.08 in) (based on two specimens only) and females 37.1–40.5 mm (1.46–1.59 in) (based on four specimens) in snout–vent length. The body is relatively robust. Skin is smooth. The snout is rounded. The canthus rostralis is distinct. The tympanum is oval and conspicuous. Fingers have small discs and dermal fringes but lack webbing. Also the toes have dermal fringes but lack webbing; the toe discs are expanded into pads. The dorsum is greenish yellow with transverse black stripes that may form a reticulated pattern. There are black canthal and interorbital stripes. Forearms and legs are greenish yellow with black bars. The venter is uniform yellow. The iris is light blue to grayish green or grayish yellow.

== Habitat and ecology ==
Pristimantis ecuadorensis is known from primary forest as well as banana and sugar cane plantations bordering native forest. They are closely associated with the leaf axils of bromeliads, Heliconia plants and fronds of Ceroxylon and Wettinia palms. They may be found perching on top of leaves or inside leaf axils some 15 to 150 cm (5.9 to 59.1 in) above the ground, creased leaves, or moss of epiphytic plants. Males have also been heard calling from these microhabitats.

Fecal samples suggest that their diet consists of various arthropods, containing the remains of beetles, crickets and spiders.

== Conservation ==
The International Union for Conservation of Nature (IUCN) has not yet assessed this species, but following their criteria, the new species probably qualifies as "Endangered". Once relatively abundant, it appears to have declined in abundance in its type locality, and its distribution area is small. Habitat loss is also affecting its range.

Approximate range of Pristimantis ecuadorensis in the Cotopaxi and Pichincha Provinces of Ecuador.
