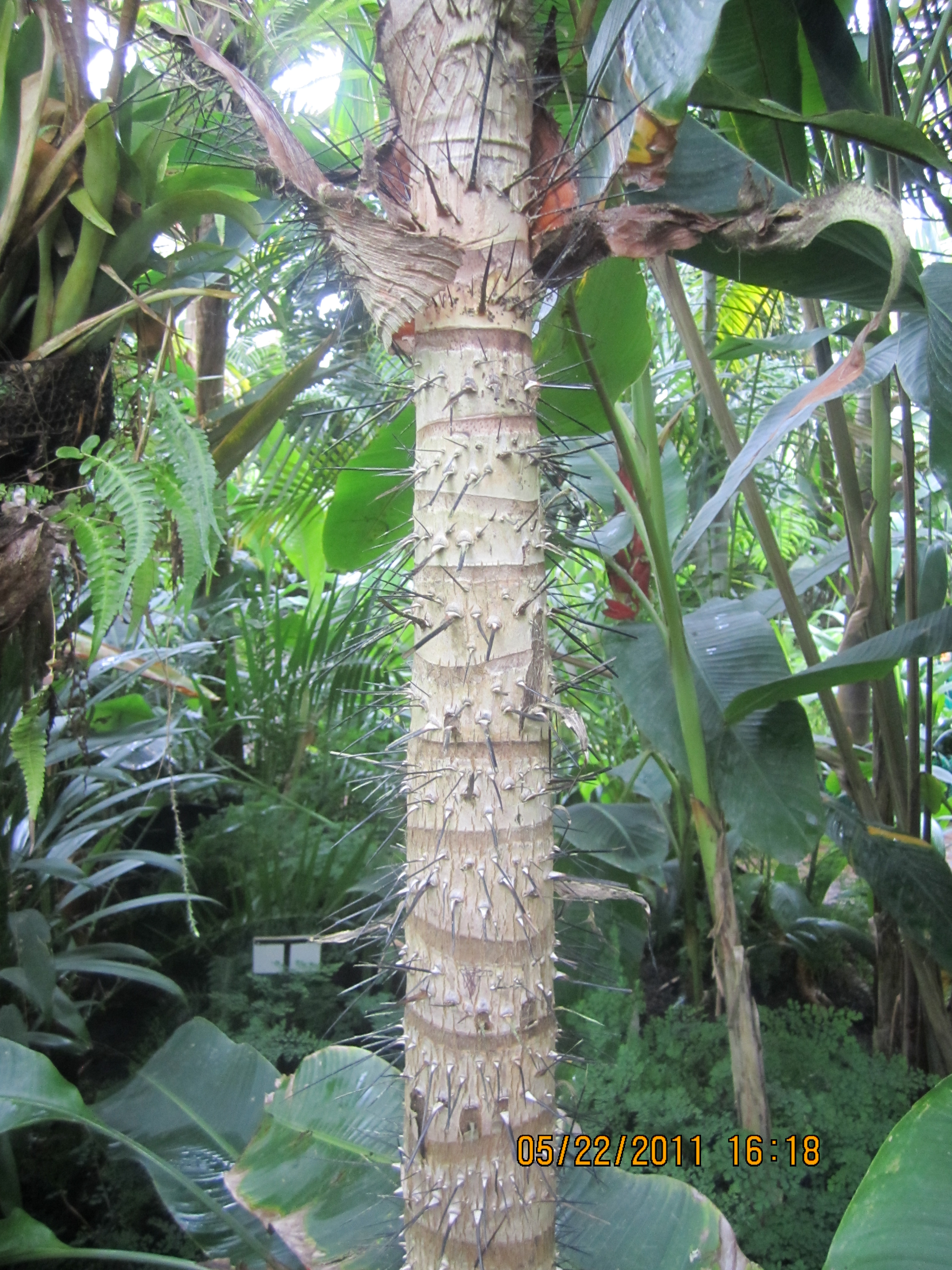
- Dictyocaryum lamarckianum

Scientific classification
- Kingdom: Plantae
- Clade: Tracheophytes
- Clade: Angiosperms
- Clade: Monocots
- Clade: Commelinids
- Order: Arecales
- Family: Arecaceae
- Subfamily: Arecoideae
- Tribe: Iriarteeae; Drude

= Iriarteeae =

Tribe of palms

Iriarteeae is a palm tribe in the subfamily Arecoideae.

== Genera ==
Iriarteeae includes the following genera:

- Dictyocaryum
- Iriartea
- Iriartella
- Socratea
- Wettinia

== See also ==
- List of Arecaceae genera
