= Pristimantis galdi =

Conservation status
- Least Concern (IUCN 3.1)

Scientific classification
- Kingdom: Animalia
- Phylum: Chordata
- Class: Amphibia
- Order: Anura
- Family: Strabomantidae
- Genus: Pristimantis
- Species: P. galdi

Binomial name
- Pristimantis galdi Jiménez de la Espada, 1870

Synonyms
- Eleutherodactylus galdi (Jimenez de la Espada, 1870); Hylodes Festae Peracca, 1904; Hylodes margaritifer Boulenger, 1912

Species of frog

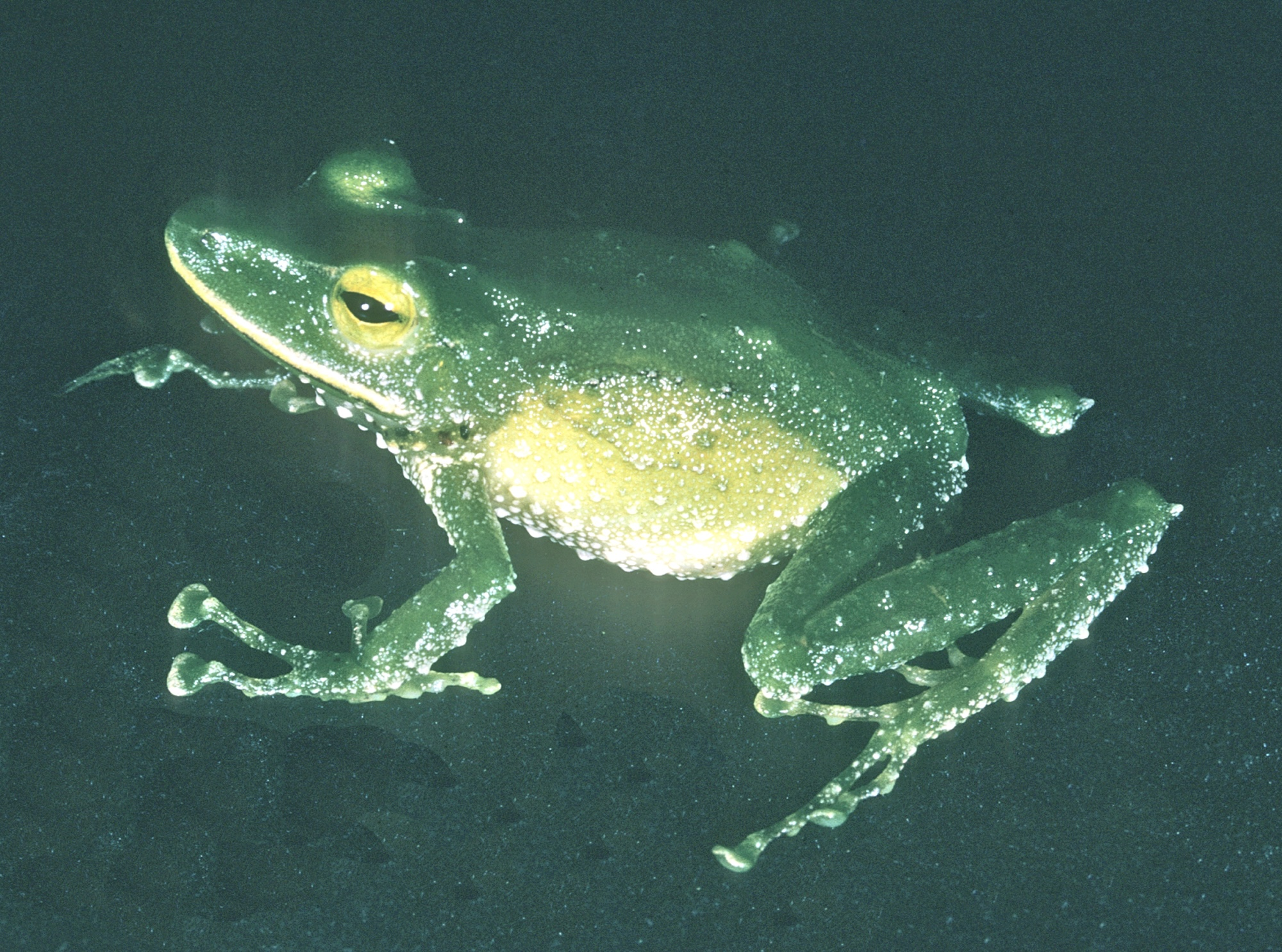
Pristimantis galdi

Pristimantis galdi is a species of frog in the family Strabomantidae. Its common name is Espada's robber frog. It is found in Ecuador and Peru. Its natural habitats are evergreen secondary and old growth humid montane forest . It is threatened by habitat loss.
