= Wettinia fascicularis =

Conservation status
- Least Concern (IUCN 2.3)

Scientific classification
- Kingdom: Plantae
- Clade: Tracheophytes
- Clade: Angiosperms
- Clade: Monocots
- Clade: Commelinids
- Order: Arecales
- Family: Arecaceae
- Genus: Wettinia
- Species: W. fascicularis

Binomial name
- Wettinia fascicularis (Burret) H.E.Moore & J.Dransf.

Species of palm

Wettinia fascicularis is a species of flowering plant in the family Arecaceae. It is found in Colombia and Ecuador.
