= Wettinia kalbreyeri =

Conservation status
- Least Concern (IUCN 2.3)

Scientific classification
- Kingdom: Plantae
- Clade: Tracheophytes
- Clade: Angiosperms
- Clade: Monocots
- Clade: Commelinids
- Order: Arecales
- Family: Arecaceae
- Genus: Wettinia
- Species: W. kalbreyeri

Binomial name
- Wettinia kalbreyeri (Burret) R.Bernal

Species of palm

Wettinia kalbreyeri is a species of flowering plant in the family Arecaceae. It is found in Colombia and Ecuador. The plant is named after the Victorian plant collector Guillermo Kalbreyer (1847–1912). It is commonly called the macana palm.
