= Wettinia minima =

Conservation status
- Endangered (IUCN 3.1)

Scientific classification
- Kingdom: Plantae
- Clade: Tracheophytes
- Clade: Angiosperms
- Clade: Monocots
- Clade: Commelinids
- Order: Arecales
- Family: Arecaceae
- Genus: Wettinia
- Species: W. minima

Binomial name
- Wettinia minima R.Bernal

Species of palm

Wettinia minima is a species of flowering plant in the family Arecaceae found only in Ecuador. Its natural habitat being subtropical or tropical moist montane forests, it is threatened by habitat loss.
