= James Clements (ornithologist) =

American ornithologist, author, and businessman

- Born: 31 October 1927; Wickam Bishops, Essex, United Kingdom
- Died: 9 June 2005 (aged 77); Oceanside, California, United States

James Franklin Clements (October 31, 1927 – June 9, 2005) was an American ornithologist, author and businessman. He was born in New York, United States.

He married Mary Norton and they had two sons. His second marriage, which lasted 14 years, was to Christina. He married a third time, to Karen.

He received his PhD from California Western University in 1975. His thesis became the first edition of his Birds of the World, A Check List (now in its sixth edition). Clements was mostly finished with the sixth edition at the time of his death, and responsibility for the series was taken up by the Cornell Laboratory of Ornithology (Cornell Lab) by arrangement with Clements's widow, Karen. The Cornell Lab finished the sixth edition, maintains corrections and updates for it, and plans to publish future editions.

The specific epithet of a bird, the Iquitos gnatcatcher, Polioptila clementsi, is named after him.

He died at Tri-City Hospital, Oceanside, California of complications associated with acute myeloid leukemia.

== Bibliography ==
- Birds of the World, A Check List
