= Wettinia anomala =

Conservation status
- Least Concern (IUCN 2.3)

Scientific classification
- Kingdom: Plantae
- Clade: Tracheophytes
- Clade: Angiosperms
- Clade: Monocots
- Clade: Commelinids
- Order: Arecales
- Family: Arecaceae
- Genus: Wettinia
- Species: W. anomala

Binomial name
- Wettinia anomala (Burret) R.Bernal

Species of palm

Wettinia anomala is a species of flowering plant in the family Arecaceae. It is found in Colombia and Ecuador.
