= Iquitos gnatcatcher =

Scientific classification
- Kingdom: Animalia
- Phylum: Chordata
- Class: Aves
- Order: Passeriformes
- Family: Polioptilidae
- Genus: Polioptila
- Species: P. clementsi

Binomial name
- Polioptila clementsi Whitney & Álvarez A, J, 2005

Species of bird

The Iquitos gnatcatcher (Polioptila clementsi) is a bird in the family Polioptilidae. It was first described in 2005. It is known only from the Allpahuayo-Mishana National Reserve, west of Iquitos, Peru.

== Taxonomy and systematics ==
The Iquitos gnatcatcher is a member of the Guianan gnatcatcher (Polioptila guianensis) complex. It was accepted as a new species by the South American Classification Committee of the American Ornithological Society (SACC/AOS) in July 2006 and by other taxonomic bodies at about that time. However, BirdLife International (BLI) recognizes it only as a subspecies of Guianan gnatcatcher.

Its specific epithet was chosen to honor the American ornithologist James F. Clements.

== Description ==
All of the specimens of Iquitos gnatcatcher have been immature, so the adult plumage has not been formally described. However, observations of apparent adults showed no differences from that of the immatures. The immatures were 11 cm (4.3 in) long and weighed 5 to 6 g (0.18 to 0.21 oz). The male's entire upper side from crown to rump is dark gray. It has a narrow, broken, white eye ring. Its throat and breast are medium gray and the belly white. The innermost feathers of its tail are black and the outermost approximately 80% white, with those between intergrading.

== Distribution and habitat ==
The only known population of the Iquitos gnatcatcher is the Allpahuayo-Mishana National Reserve, west of Iquitos, Peru. The reserve is "on [the] border of ecoregions characterized as Napo moist forest and Iquitos várzea. The elevation there is 150 m (490 ft).

== Behavior ==
=== Feeding ===
The Iquitos gnatcatcher's diet is not well known, but is assumed to be insects like that of other Polioptila gnatcatchers. It actively forages in the upper quarter of trees with mixed-species flocks, usually gleaning from the ends of branches and sometimes sallying out to catch flying insects.

=== Breeding ===
"The nest, eggs, and breeding behavior of Iquitos Gnatcatcher remain undescribed."

=== Vocalization ===
The Iquitos gnatcatcher's song is "a distinctly two-part series" . It also has a variety of calls.

== Status ==
Because BLI does not recognize the Iquitos gnatcatcher as a species, the IUCN has not assessed its status separately from that of the Guianan gnatcatcher complex. Its entire known range is approximately 2,000 ha (7.7 sq mi), and logging is permitted there. Its population is fewer than 250 mature individuals. Those data and "continuing loss of [its] apparently specialized white-sand forest habitat" meet the IUCN criteria for Critically Endangered status.
