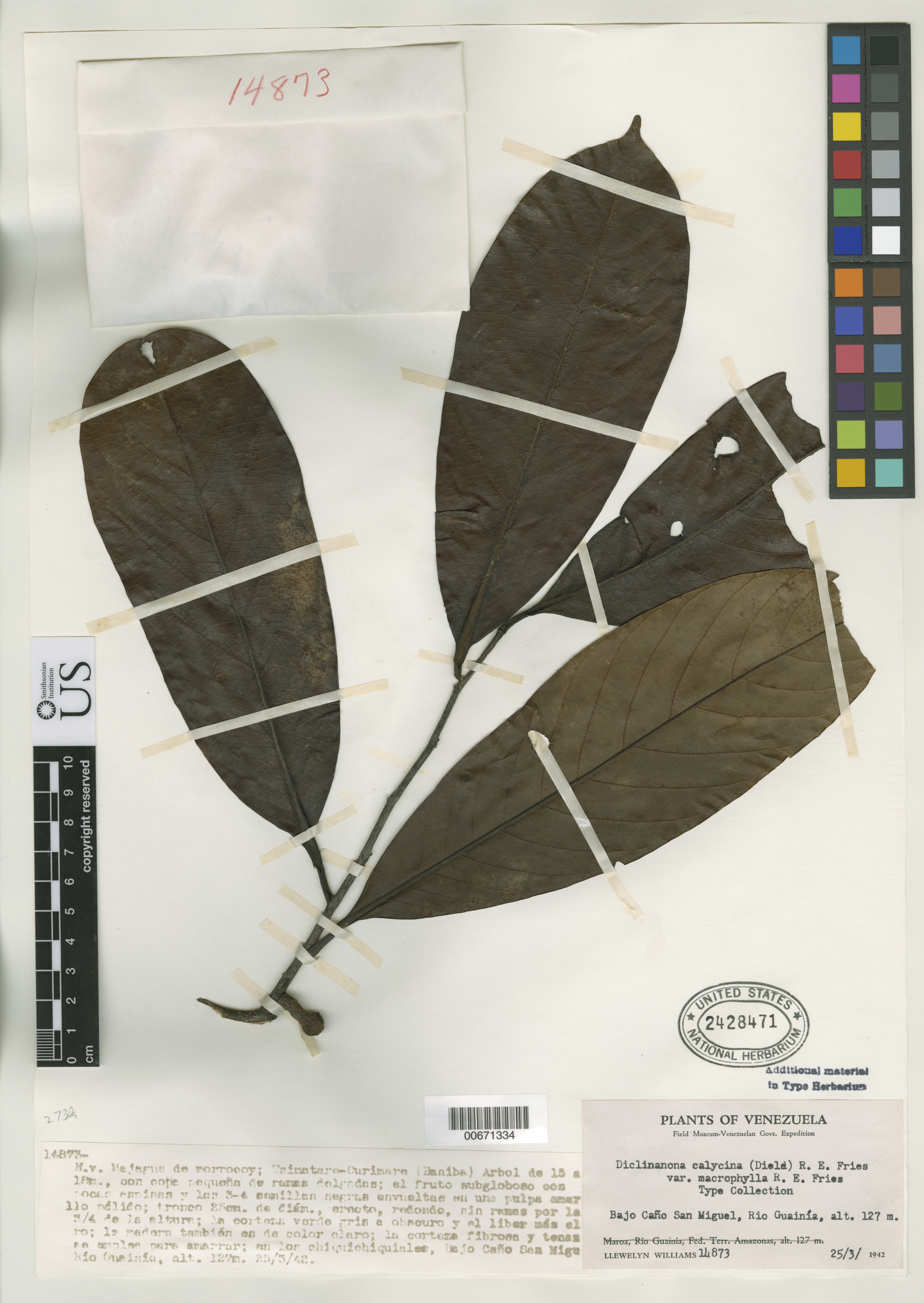

Conservation status
- Least Concern (IUCN 3.1)

Scientific classification
- Kingdom: Plantae
- Clade: Embryophytes
- Clade: Tracheophytes
- Clade: Angiosperms
- Clade: Magnoliids
- Order: Magnoliales
- Family: Annonaceae
- Genus: Diclinanona
- Species: D. calycina

Binomial name
- Diclinanona calycina (Diels) R.E.Fr.

Synonyms
- Diclinanona calycina var. macrophylla R.E.Fr.; Xylopia calycina Diels

= Diclinanona calycina =

Species of plant

Diclinanona calycina is a species of flowering plant in the family Annonaceae. It is a tree native to northern Brazil, Colombia, northern Peru, and Venezuela. Ludwig Diels, the German botanist who first formally described the species using the basionym Xylopia calycina, named it after its well-developed calyx (calycinus in Latin).

== Description ==
It is a tree reaching 30 meters in height and 30 centimeters in diameter. Its petioles are 5-15 millimeters long. Its leaves are arranged in two rows. Its elliptical to oval, papery leaves are 10–25 by 3–8 centimeters. The upper surfaces of the leaves are shiny and variably hairless or hairy. The undersides of the leaves have white hairs, particularly along the veins. Its leaves have 14–18 secondary veins emanating from either side of the midrib. Its axillary inflorescences have 2–4 flowers. The flowers are on 6–15 by 0.5-5 millimeter pedicels. Each pedicel has 2 bracts. Its yellow flowers are either male or have both male and female reproductive organs. Its flowers have 3 oval to triangular sepals that are 4–6 millimeters long. The margins of the sepals touch but are not fused and remain attached through fruit maturation. Its flowers have 6 oblong to elliptical petals that are 9–13 by 2.5–3 millimeters. Male flowers have numerous stamens. Bisexual flowers have few stamens and 3–5 carpels. Its round fruit occur in groups of 1–5, are 2.5–3.5 centimeters in diameter, and covered in brown hair. The fruit have 3–8 shiny, brown elliptical seeds that are 1.7–2 centimeters long.

=== Reproductive biology ===
The pollen of D. calycina is shed as permanent tetrads.

=== Habitat and distribution ===
It has been observed growing in forest habitats with clay soil.

=== Uses ===
Bioactive molecules extracted from its leaves and bark have been reported to have antimicrobial and antiplatelet activity.
