= Wettinia drudei =

Conservation status
- Least Concern (IUCN 2.3)

Scientific classification
- Kingdom: Plantae
- Clade: Tracheophytes
- Clade: Angiosperms
- Clade: Monocots
- Clade: Commelinids
- Order: Arecales
- Family: Arecaceae
- Genus: Wettinia
- Species: W. drudei

Binomial name
- Wettinia drudei (O.F. Cook & Doyle) A.J.Hend.

Species of palm

Wettinia drudei is a species of flowering plant in the family Arecaceae. It is found in Brazil, Colombia, Ecuador, and Peru. It is a tree that grows in the wet tropical biome.
