= Wettinia aequatorialis =

Conservation status
- Vulnerable (IUCN 3.1)

Scientific classification
- Kingdom: Plantae
- Clade: Tracheophytes
- Clade: Angiosperms
- Clade: Monocots
- Clade: Commelinids
- Order: Arecales
- Family: Arecaceae
- Genus: Wettinia
- Species: W. aequatorialis

Binomial name
- Wettinia aequatorialis R.Bernal

Species of palm

Wettinia aequatorialis is a species of flowering plant in the family Arecaceae. It is commonly found in the country of Ecuador; more specifically the southern part. Its natural habitat is subtropical or tropical moist montane forests. This species is threatened by habitat loss.
