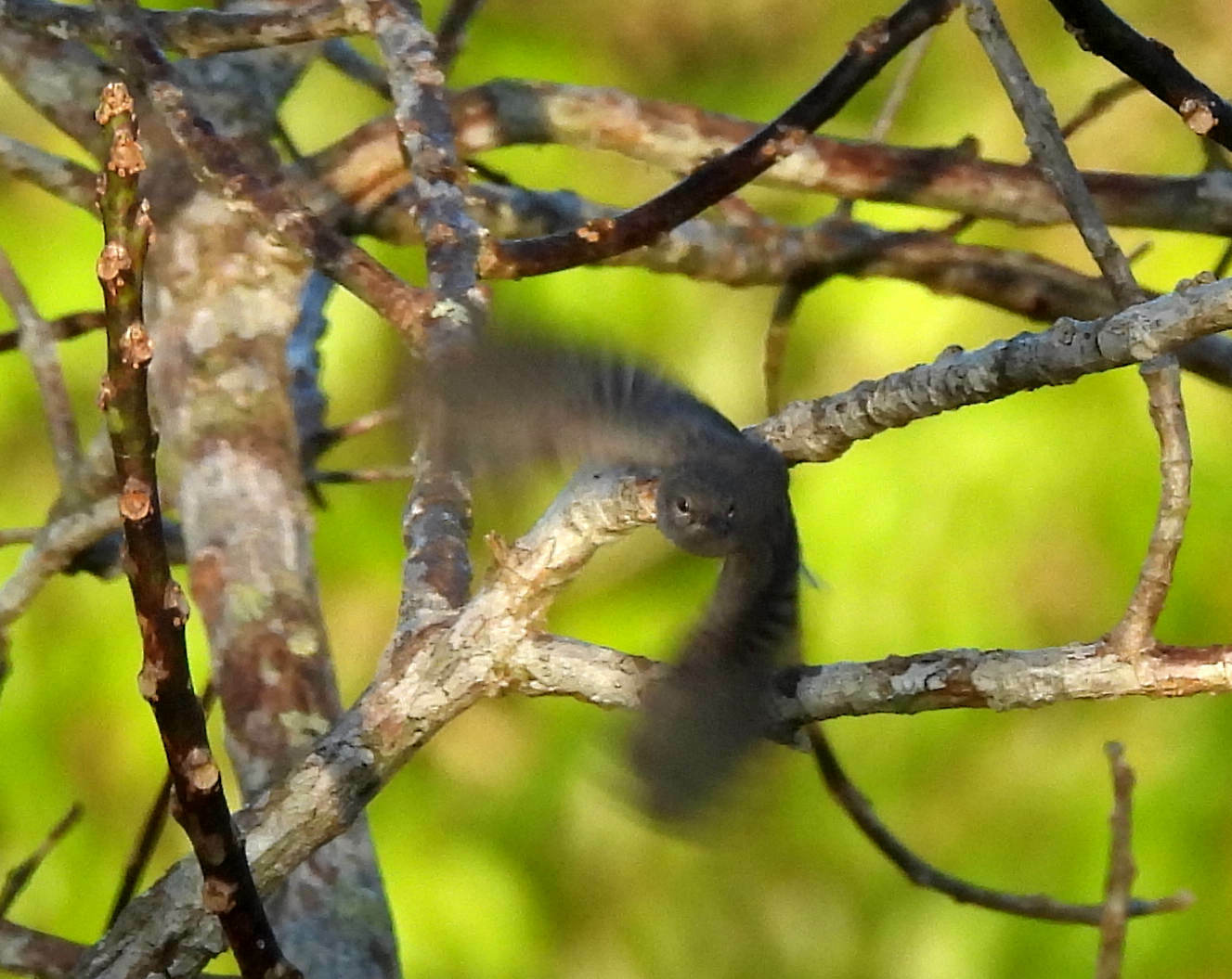

Scientific classification
- Kingdom: Animalia
- Phylum: Chordata
- Class: Aves
- Order: Passeriformes
- Family: Polioptilidae
- Genus: Polioptila
- Species: P. paraensis

Binomial name
- Polioptila paraensis Todd, 1937

= Para gnatcatcher =

Species of bird

The Para gnatcatcher (Polioptila paraensis) or Klages's gnatcatcher is a species of bird in the family Polioptilidae. It is endemic to Brazil.

== Taxonomy ==
The Para gnatcatcher was formally described in 1937 as Polioptila paraensis by the American ornithologist W. E. Clyde Todd based on a specimen that had been collected by Samuel M. Klages near Benevides in the state of Pará of northern Brazil. The Para gnatcatcher was formerly considered as a subspecies of the Guianan gnatcatcher (Polioptila guianensis).

Three subspecies are recognised:

- Polioptila paraensis facilis Zimmer, JT, 1942 – eastern Colombia (Vaupés and Guainía) and southern Venezuela (Amazonas) to far northern Brazil (northern Amazonas and west-central Roraima)
- Polioptila paraensis attenboroughi Whittaker, A, Aleixo, ALP, Whitney, BM, Smith, BT & Klicka, J, 2013 – western Amazonian Brazil south of the Amazon River and west of the Rio Madeira
- Polioptila paraensis paraensis Todd, WEC, 1937 – eastern Amazonian Brazil south of the Amazon River and east of the Rio Madeira

The subspecies P. p. attenboroughi and P. p. facilis have sometimes been recognised as separate species, the Inambari gnatcatcher and the Rio Negro gnatcatcher.

== Description ==
The Para gnatcatcher is 10 to 11 cm (3.9 to 4.3 in) long and weighs approximately 6 g (0.21 oz). The male's head, back, and breast are mouse gray and the rest of its underparts white. There is minimal contrast between the throat, breast, and belly. The innermost feathers of its tail are black and the outermost white, with those between intergrading. The female is similar but has a paler face.

== Distribution and habitat ==
The Para gnatcatcher is found only in Brazil, in a broad band south of the Amazon River from its mouth southwest almost to northern Bolivia. It inhabits the borders and canopy of humid primary forest, mostly below 500 m (1,600 ft) elevation.

== Behavior ==
=== Feeding ===
The Para gnatcatcher's diet is little known but is assumed to be arthropods like that of other Polioptila gnatcatchers. It actively forages in the canopy and sub-canopy.

=== Breeding ===
The Para gnatcatcher's breeding phenology has not been documented.

=== Vocalization ===
The Para gnatcatcher's song is "repeated high...notes, evenly delivered" .

== Status ==
The IUCN has not assessed the Para gnatcatcher. "Of the ecoregions occupied by this species, only one (Tocantins/Pindare moist forest) is considered to be at serious risk."
