= Wettinia longipetala =

Conservation status
- Vulnerable (IUCN 2.3)

Scientific classification
- Kingdom: Plantae
- Clade: Tracheophytes
- Clade: Angiosperms
- Clade: Monocots
- Clade: Commelinids
- Order: Arecales
- Family: Arecaceae
- Genus: Wettinia
- Species: W. longipetala

Binomial name
- Wettinia longipetala A.H.Gentry

Species of plant

Wettinia longipetala is a species of tree in the family Arecaceae. It is found only in Peru, and is considered a vulnerable species by the IUCN.
