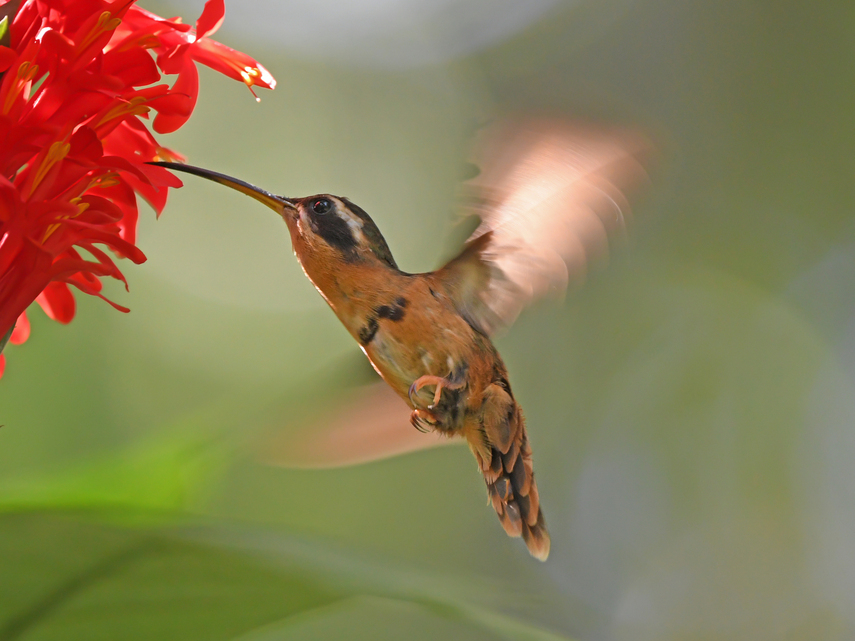

Conservation status
- Least Concern (IUCN 3.1)
- CITES Appendix II

Scientific classification
- Kingdom: Animalia
- Phylum: Chordata
- Class: Aves
- Order: Apodiformes
- Family: Trochilidae
- Genus: Phaethornis
- Species: P. stuarti

Binomial name
- Phaethornis stuarti Hartert, 1897

= White-browed hermit =

Species of hummingbird

The white-browed hermit (Phaethornis stuarti) is a species of hummingbird in the family Trochilidae. It is found in the Andean foothills and adjacent lowlands in Bolivia and Peru. Its natural habitat is subtropical or tropical moist lowland forest.

== Taxonomy and systematics ==
The white-browed hermit has been suggested to be conspecific with the reddish hermit (P. ruber) "but they are clearly separate species". The white-browed hermit is monotypic.

== Description ==
The white-browed hermit is 10 cm (4 in) long and weighs 2.5 g (0.09 oz). Sexes are similar, but males have a narrow black breast band and females have longer central tail feathers with paler tips. The facial pattern includes a distinct whitish supercilium and white throat. The bill is black above and yellow below.

The species is difficult to distinguish from the very similar Reddish Hermit (Phaethornis ruber) which generally occurs at lower elevations, and identification criteria between the two species is still not well known. White-browed Hermit may be slightly paler with more bronze coloration in the tail.

== Distribution and habitat ==
The white-browed hermit's range extends along the base of the Andes from central Peru south to central Bolivia, in an elevational band from 350 m to 1400 m. The species is generally encountered most often within forest interior, although individuals occasionally forage along forest edge.

== Behavior ==
=== Movement ===
The white-browed hermit is assumed to be sedentary.

=== Feeding ===
Like most hummingbirds, the white-browed hermit feeds mostly on nectar from a variety of flowers, but also consumes some small arthropods.

=== Breeding ===
The white-browed hermit's breeding phenology has not been documented.

=== Vocalization ===
The white-browed hermit's song is "a descending, accelerating series of high-pitched notes, 'tseee-tsee-tsee-tsi-ti-tututu' interspersed by quiet 'tewp' notes."

== Status ==
The IUCN has assessed the white-browed hermit as being of Least Concern, though its population size is unknown and believed to be decreasing. It is "[v]ery poorly known, and should probably be classed as Data Deficient".
