= Iriartella stenocarpa =

Scientific classification
- Kingdom: Plantae
- Clade: Tracheophytes
- Clade: Angiosperms
- Clade: Monocots
- Clade: Commelinids
- Order: Arecales
- Family: Arecaceae
- Genus: Iriartella
- Species: I. stenocarpa

Binomial name
- Iriartella stenocarpa Burret

Species of palm

Iriartella stenocarpa (common name: paxiubinha-de-macaco) is a species of palm found in northern South America.
