= Rio Negro gnatcatcher =

Scientific classification
- Kingdom: Animalia
- Phylum: Chordata
- Class: Aves
- Order: Passeriformes
- Family: Polioptilidae
- Genus: Polioptila
- Species: P. facilis

Binomial name
- Polioptila facilis Zimmer, JT, 1942

Species of bird

The Rio Negro gnatcatcher (Polioptila facilis) is a species of bird in the family Polioptilidae. It is endemic to Brazil.

== Taxonomy and systematics ==
The Rio Negro gnatcatcher is monotypic. It was formerly treated as a subspecies of the Guianan gnatcatcher (Polioptila guianensis) but since mid-2019, it has been classified as a separate species based on significant differences in morphology and vocalization.

== Description ==
The Rio Negro gnatcatcher is 10 to 11 cm (3.9 to 4.3 in) long and weighs 6 to 7 g (0.21 to 0.25 oz). The male's head, breast, and back are bluish gray and its belly is white with minimal contrast between the two colors. The innermost feathers of its tail are black and the outermost are white with those between intergrading. The female is similar but paler.

== Distribution and habitat ==
The Rio Negro gnatcatcher is found in northern Amazonas, Brazil and in the immediately adjacent areas of southern Venezuela and eastern Colombia. Much of its range is drained by the Rio Negro, a blackwater tributary of the Amazon River. It inhabits the borders and canopy of humid primary forest mostly below 500 m (1,600 ft) elevation.

== Behavior ==
=== Feeding ===
The Rio Negro gnatcatcher's diet is not well known and assumed to be arthropods like that of other Polioptila gnatcatchers. It actively forages, usually as part of mixed-species flocks.

=== Breeding ===
The Rio Negro gnatcatcher's breeding phenology has not been documented.

=== Vocalization ===
The Rio Negro gnatcatcher's song is repeated high notes .

== Status ==
The IUCN has not assessed the Rio Negro gnatcatcher, and "the species' ecoregion of primary occurrence...[is] not considered to be at any serious risk".
