= The Clements Checklist of Birds of the World =

Book

The Clements Checklist of the Birds of the World
- The cover of the sixth edition
- Author: James F. Clements
- Language: English
- Genre: Ornithology
- Publisher: Cornell University Press
- Publication date: 2007
- Publication place: U.S.
- Media type: Print (hardback)

The Clements Checklist of Birds of the World is a book by Jim Clements which presents a list of the bird species of the world.

The most recent printed version is the sixth edition (2007), but has been updated yearly, the last version in 2024, and is published by Cornell University Press. Previous editions were published by the author's own imprint, Ibis Publishing. The Cornell Lab of Ornithology has provided annual updates since then, usually in August, and the most recent version is available online in several formats. These updates reflect the ongoing changes to bird taxonomy based on published research.

Clements is the official list used by the American Birding Association for birds globally. eBird also uses the Clements checklist as the base list for its eBird taxonomy, which in addition to species includes hybrids and other non-species entities reported by birders.
