= Guianan gnatcatcher =

Conservation status
- Least Concern (IUCN 3.1)

Scientific classification
- Kingdom: Animalia
- Phylum: Chordata
- Class: Aves
- Order: Passeriformes
- Family: Polioptilidae
- Genus: Polioptila
- Species: P. guianensis

Binomial name
- Polioptila guianensis Todd, 1920

Species of bird

The Guianan gnatcatcher (Polioptila guianensis) is a species of bird in the family Polioptilidae. It is found in Brazil, French Guiana, Guyana, Suriname, and Venezuela.

== Taxonomy and systematics ==
The Guianan gnatcatcher is monotypic. Two former subspecies, Rio Negro gnatcatcher (Polioptila facilis) and Para gnatcatcher (P. paraensis, also called Klages's gnatcatcher) have been treated as separate species since mid-2019. The Inambari gnatcatcher (P. attenboroughi) and Iquitos gnatcatcher (P. clementsi), which were accepted as new species at about that time, are very closely related to it.

== Description ==
The Guianan gnatcatcher is 10 to 11 cm (3.9 to 4.3 in) long and weighs 5 to 7 g (0.18 to 0.25 oz). The male's head, back, and breast are bluish gray. It has a broken white eye ring. The innermost feathers of its tail are black and the two outermost white. Its throat and belly are white. The female is similar but a paler gray and has a white supercilium.

== Distribution and habitat ==
The Guianan gnatcatcher is found in the Guianas and adjoining Brazil south to the Amazon River. Its range might also extend westward into eastern Venezuela. It inhabits the borders and canopy of humid primary forest, savanna forest, and dryland forest.

== Behavior ==
=== Feeding ===
The Guianan gnatcatcher's diet has not been documented but is assumed to be arthropods like that of other Polioptila gnatcatchers. It actively forages as part of mixed-species flocks.

=== Breeding ===
The Guianan gnatcatcher's breeding phenology is essentially unknown, but "A male was observed feeding a fledgling on 27 November 1984 in French Guiana".

=== Vocalization ===
The Guianan gnatcatcher's song is "fairly simple...repeated high notes".

== Status ==
The IUCN has not assessed the Guianan gnatcatcher separately from the larger species complex that predated the 2019 splits. That complex was assessed as of Least Concern. "The species' ecoregion of primary occurrence, Guianan moist forest, not considered to be at serious risk, given its current and projected conservation status."
