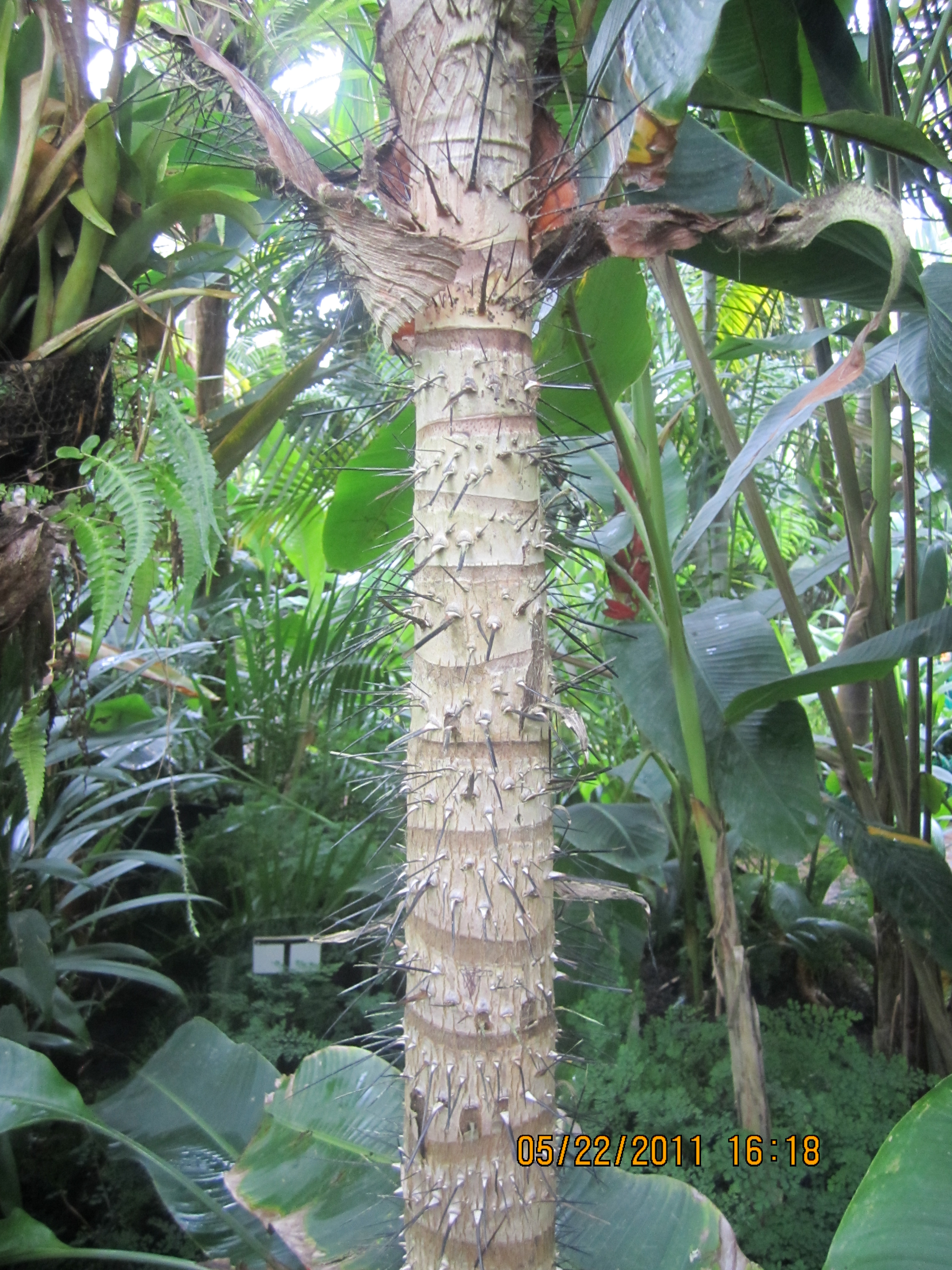
- Dictyocaryum lamarckianum

Scientific classification
- Kingdom: Plantae
- Clade: Tracheophytes
- Clade: Angiosperms
- Clade: Monocots
- Clade: Commelinids
- Order: Arecales
- Family: Arecaceae
- Subfamily: Arecoideae
- Tribe: Iriarteeae
- Genus: Dictyocaryum; H. Wendl.

Species
- Dictyocaryum fuscum; Dictyocaryum lamarckianum; Dictyocaryum ptarianum

= Dictyocaryum =

Genus of palms

Dictyocaryum is a genus of monoecious flowering plants in the palm family found in South America. It is closely related to the genus Iriartea; they are commonly called araque or palma real. As many as eleven species have been described but this number is reduced to three in most current accounts. The genus name translates from two Greek words meaning "net" and "nut", describing the thick network of raphe fibers around the seed.

== Description ==
Dictyocaryum palms are usually solitary in nature though D. ptarianum will occasionally cluster in habitat. All three plants have conical masses of stilt roots at the base which are armed with spines. These stilt roots, in the case of D. fuscum, can be up to four inches (ten centimeters) thick. The trunks are conspicuously ringed by leaf scars, to 30 cm wide, and in D. lamarckianum reach over 20 m in height. All have tall crownshafts and four to six large, plumose, pinnate leaves. The leaves may be sparsely to densely tomentose on the rachis and petiole, the leaflets are regularly and widely spaced, up to 60 cm long, dark green on top and glaucous on the underside.

Compared to other palms, the inflorescences in this genus are unusually large, once-branched, and emerge below the leaf crown. Both male and female flowers are white to yellow, growing on the same plant, both with three sepals and three petals. The fruit develops from one carpel, yellow to orange to brown when ripe, containing one basally attached, spherical seed.

== Distribution and habitat ==
Palms in this genus are found in the mountainous and montane rain forest regions of Panama, Ecuador, Brazil, Peru, Bolivia, Guyana and Venezuela from low elevations up to 1800 m. They often colonize in large, conspicuous groves, on steep slopes, receiving generous rain fall, and growing in acidic, noncalcareous soil.

== Cultivation and uses ==
Their growing conditions are usually hard to mimic, making them relatively uncommon in cultivation. They require a frost-free climate, humus-rich soil, and plenty of water. In their natural range the trunks are used by indigenous people in construction and cabinet-making, the leaves are woven into thatched goods, while the fruit is eaten and made into palm wine or jelly. The Emberá Indians use the hard, durable trunks in the construction of coffins.
