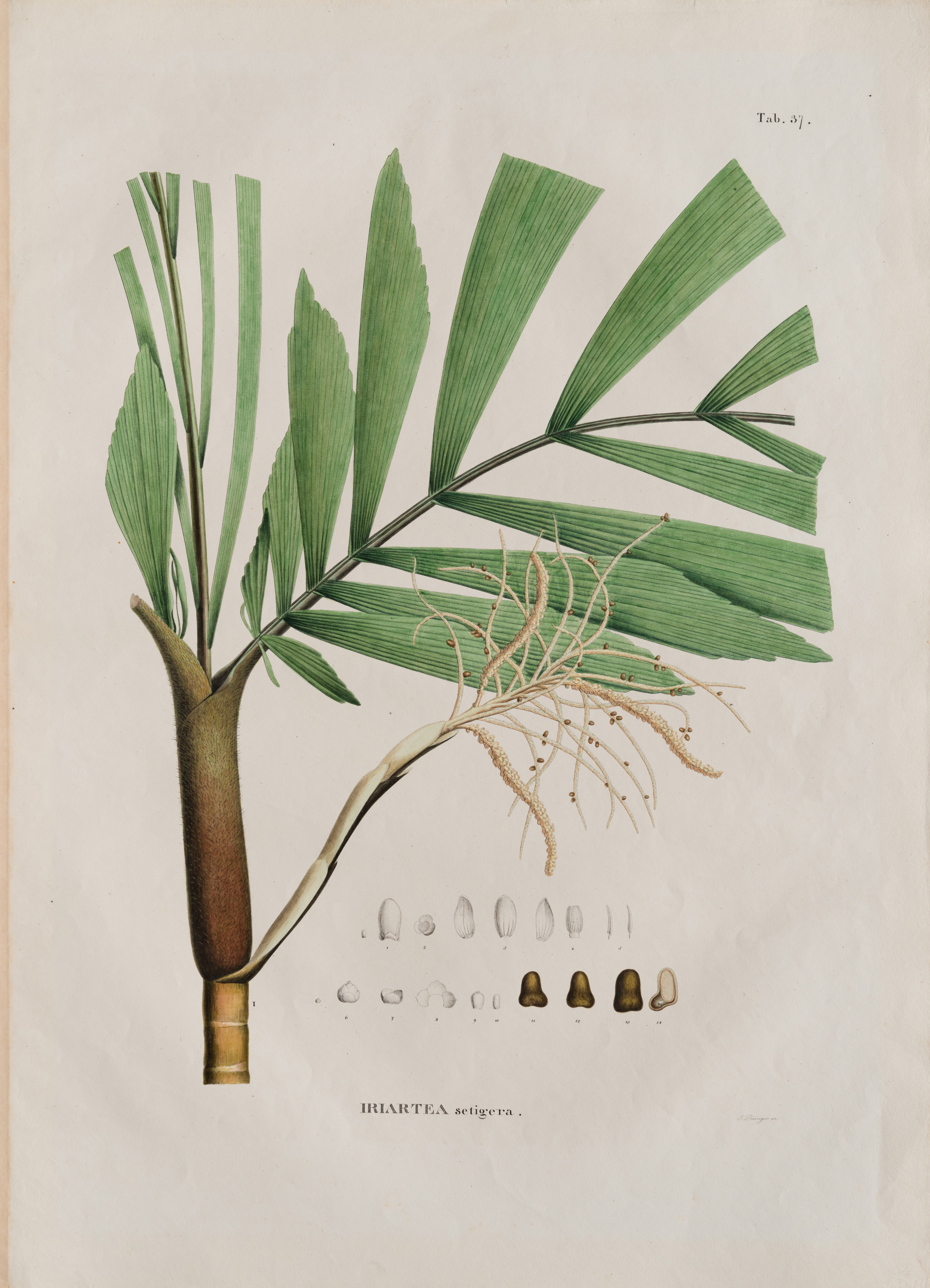

Scientific classification
- Kingdom: Plantae
- Clade: Tracheophytes
- Clade: Angiosperms
- Clade: Monocots
- Clade: Commelinids
- Order: Arecales
- Family: Arecaceae
- Genus: Iriartella
- Species: I. setigera

Binomial name
- Iriartella setigera H.Wendl.

= Iriartella setigera =

Species of palm

Iriartella setigera (common name: paxiubinha) is a species of palm found in northern South America. The Nukak people of Colombia use Iriartella setigera to fashion blowguns.
