= Diclinanona =

Scientific classification
- Kingdom: Plantae
- Clade: Tracheophytes
- Clade: Angiosperms
- Clade: Magnoliids
- Order: Magnoliales
- Family: Annonaceae
- Genus: Diclinanona; Diels

Genus of plants

Diclinanona is a genus of plants in the family Annonaceae.

== Description ==
Diclinanona are small trees with flowers. Each flower has 6 petals, which have numerous stamens.

== Species ==
Diclinanona comprises three species distributed in Brazil, Colombia, Peru and Venezuela:

- Diclinanona calycina (Diels) R.E.Fr.
- Diclinanona matogrossensis Maas
- Diclinanona tessmannii Diels
