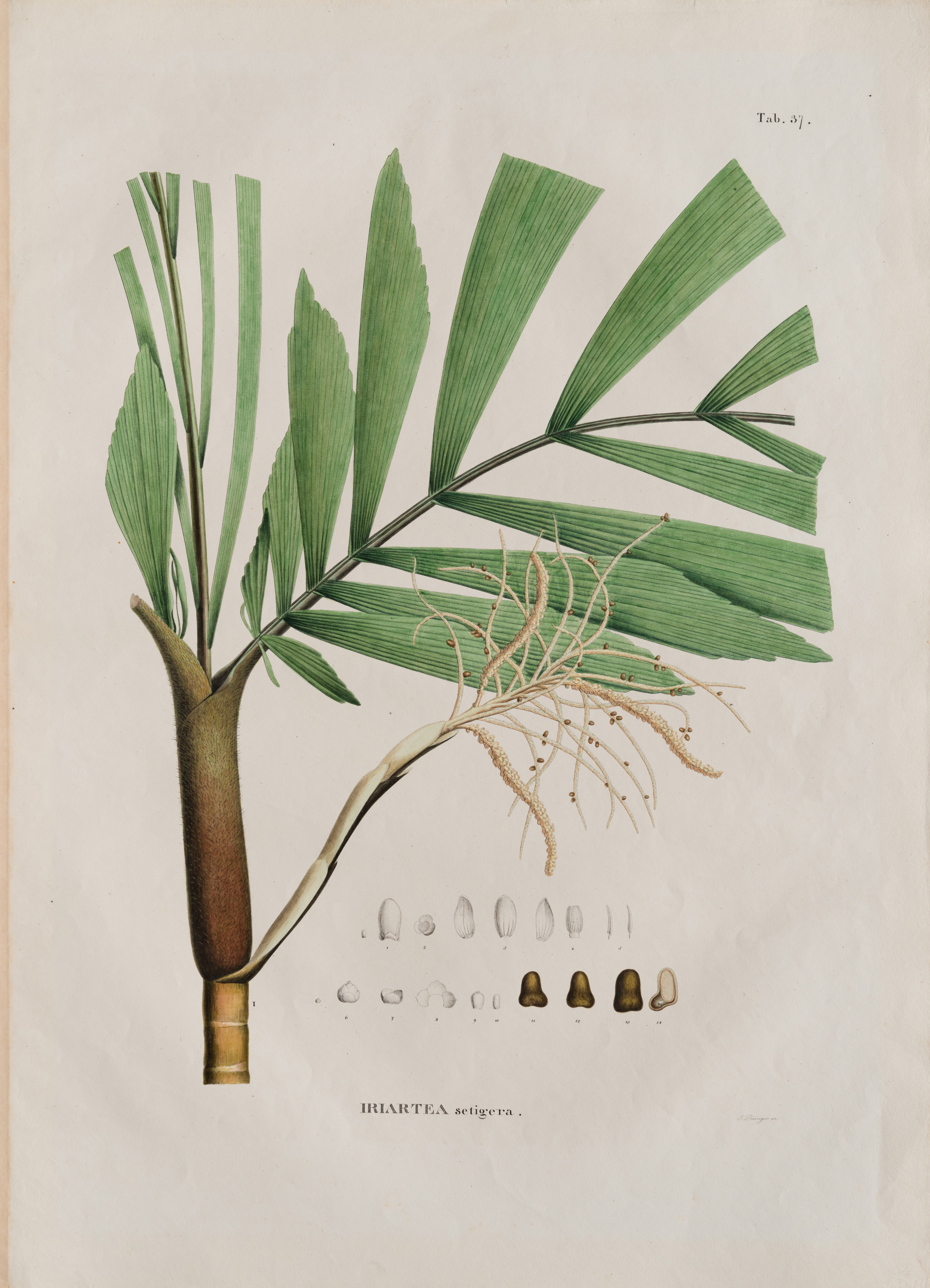
- Iriartella setigera by Carl Friedrich Philipp von Martius

Scientific classification
- Kingdom: Plantae
- Clade: Embryophytes
- Clade: Tracheophytes
- Clade: Spermatophytes
- Clade: Angiosperms
- Clade: Monocots
- Clade: Commelinids
- Order: Arecales
- Family: Arecaceae
- Subfamily: Arecoideae
- Tribe: Iriarteeae
- Genus: Iriartella; H.Wendl.

Species
- Iriartella stenocarpa Burret; Iriartella setigera (Mart.) H.Wendl.

Synonyms
- Cuatrecasea Dugand

= Iriartella =

Genus of palms

Iriartella is a genus of two species of palms found in northern and northwestern South America (Guyana, Venezuela, Colombia, Peru, and western Brazil; particularly the Acre, Amazonas, Roraima, and Pará states). The Nukak people of Colombia use Iriartella setigera to fashion blowguns.

== Species ==
- Iriartella stenocarpa Burret
- Iriartella setigera (Mart.) H.Wendl.
