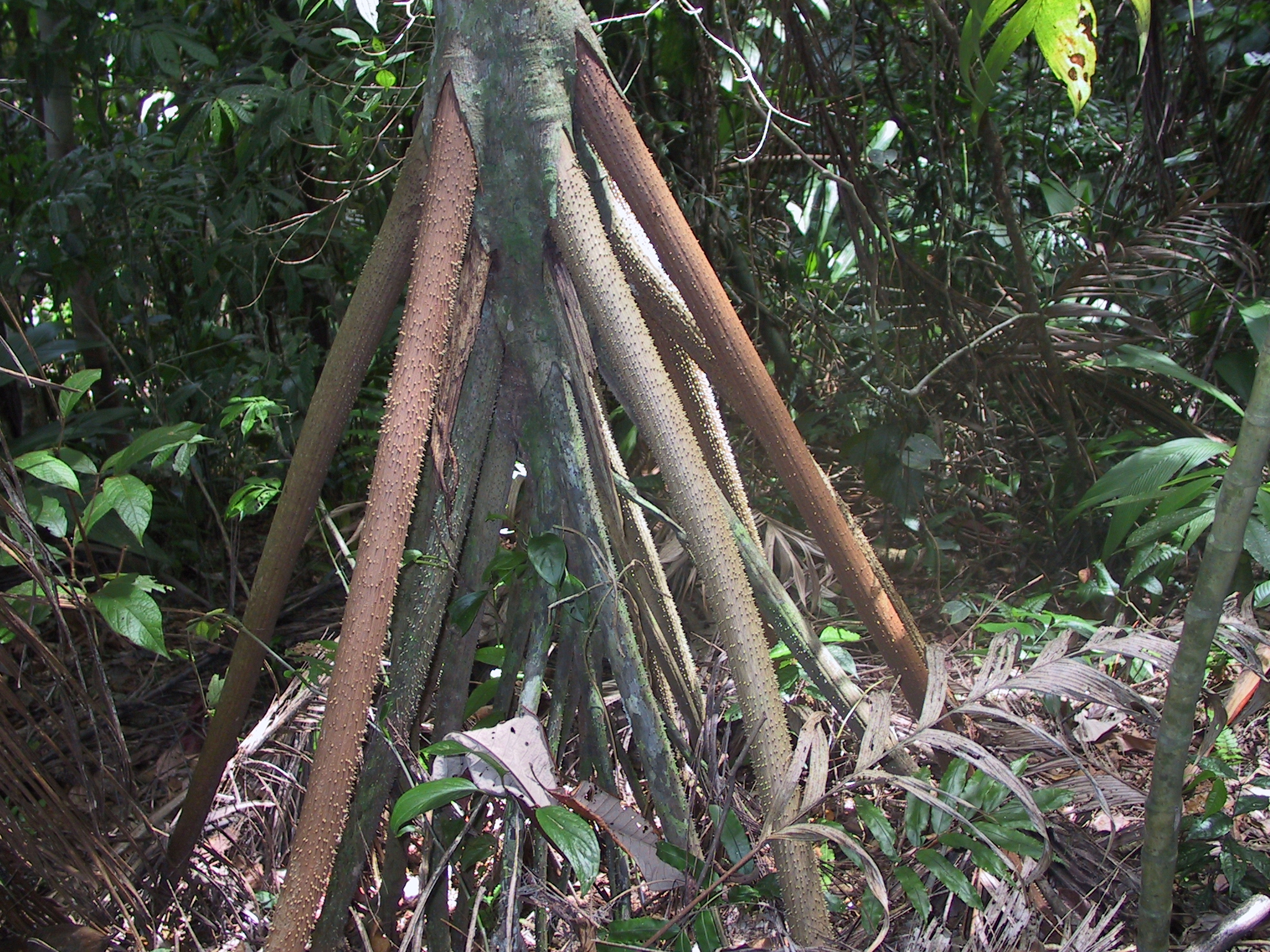
- Socratea exorrhiza stilt roots

Scientific classification
- Kingdom: Plantae
- Clade: Tracheophytes
- Clade: Angiosperms
- Clade: Monocots
- Clade: Commelinids
- Order: Arecales
- Family: Arecaceae
- Subfamily: Arecoideae
- Tribe: Iriarteeae
- Genus: Socratea; H.Karst.

Synonyms
- Metasocratea Dugand

= Socratea =

Genus of palms

Socratea is a genus of five species of palms found in tropical Central America and South America.

It is commonly believed that Socratea can move away from where it germinated by growing roots on one side and abandoning them on the other. Attempts to detect this behavior have failed. What is known for a fact is that these roots can, in the case of S. montana, grow to a length of 16.5 feet (five meters) and up to three inches (eight cm) in diameter.

== Species ==
- Socratea exorrhiza (Mart.) H.Wendl. - Costa Rica, Nicaragua, Panama, Colombia, Venezuela, the Guianas, Peru, Ecuador, Bolivia, northern and western Brazil (States of Amazonas, Amapá, Mato Grosso, Pará, Rondônia, Roraima)
- Socratea hecatonandra (Dugand) R.Bernal - Colombia, Ecuador
- Socratea montana R.Bernal & A.J.Hend. - Colombia, Ecuador
- Socratea rostrata Burret - Peru, Colombia, Ecuador
- Socratea salazarii H.E.Moore - Peru, Bolivia, western Brazil (State of Acre)
