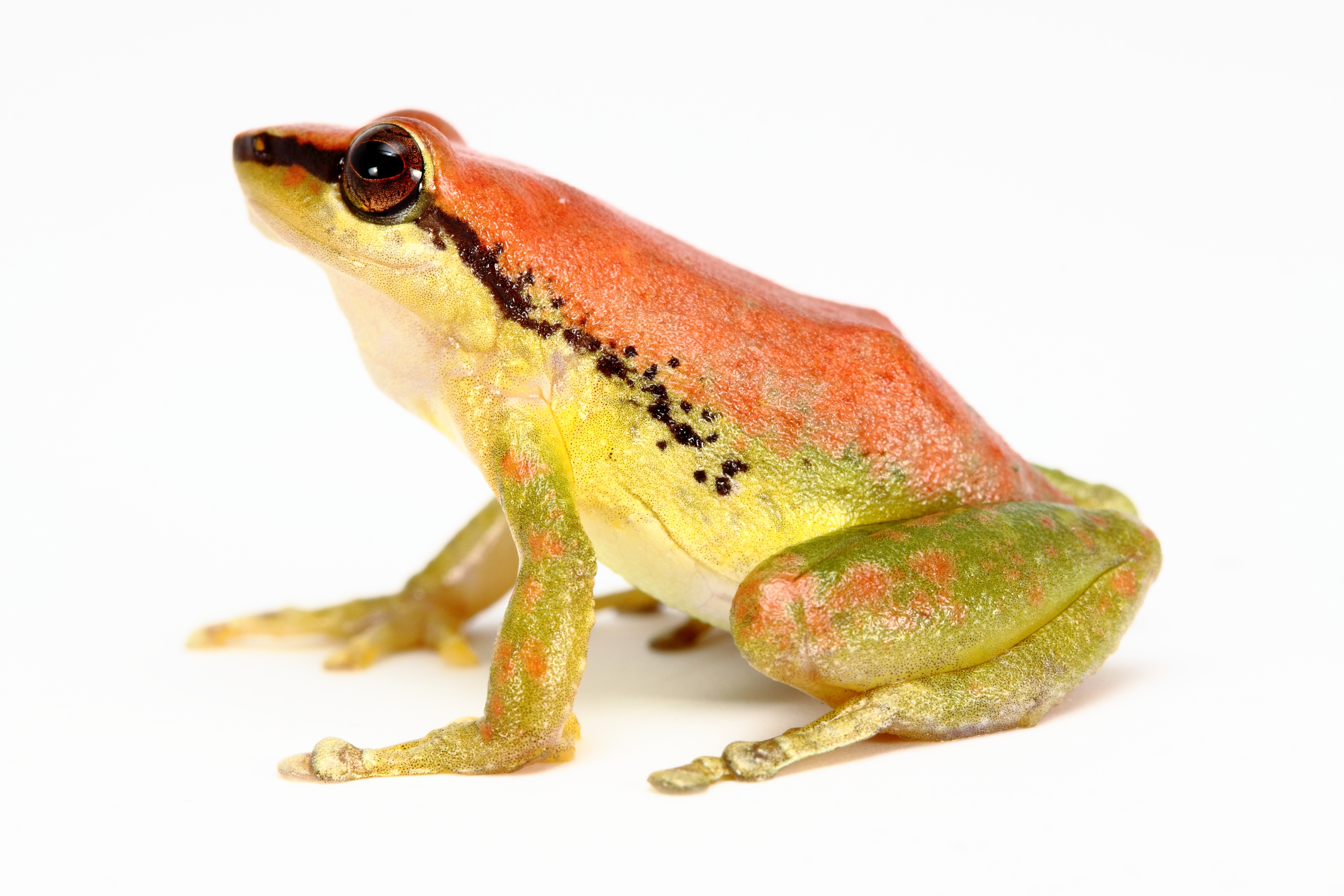

Conservation status
- Least Concern (IUCN 3.1)

Scientific classification
- Kingdom: Animalia
- Phylum: Chordata
- Class: Amphibia
- Order: Anura
- Family: Strabomantidae
- Genus: Pristimantis
- Species: P. acuminatus

Binomial name
- Pristimantis acuminatus (Shreve, 1935)

Synonyms
- Eleutherodactylus acuminatus Shreve, 1935

= Pristimantis acuminatus =

Species of frog

Pristimantis acuminatus is a species of frog in the family Strabomantidae. It is found in the Amazon rainforest of Ecuador, northern Peru, and adjacent Colombia and Brazil. It is a lowland Amazonian rainforest species that also occurs on the lower reaches of the Andes. At night these frogs can be found perched on leaves some 10–15 m (33–49 ft) above the ground; during the daytime they may be found in bromeliads or sleeping on the undersides of leaves. It may also occur in cultivated areas. This widespread species is not considered threatened.
