= Dictyocaryum lamarckianum =

Scientific classification
- Kingdom: Plantae
- Clade: Tracheophytes
- Clade: Angiosperms
- Clade: Monocots
- Clade: Commelinids
- Order: Arecales
- Family: Arecaceae
- Genus: Dictyocaryum
- Species: D. lamarckianum

Binomial name
- Dictyocaryum lamarckianum (Mart.) H.Wendl.

Species of palm

Dictyocaryum lamarckianum is a species of flowering plant in the family Arecaceae. It is found in Panama and South America.
