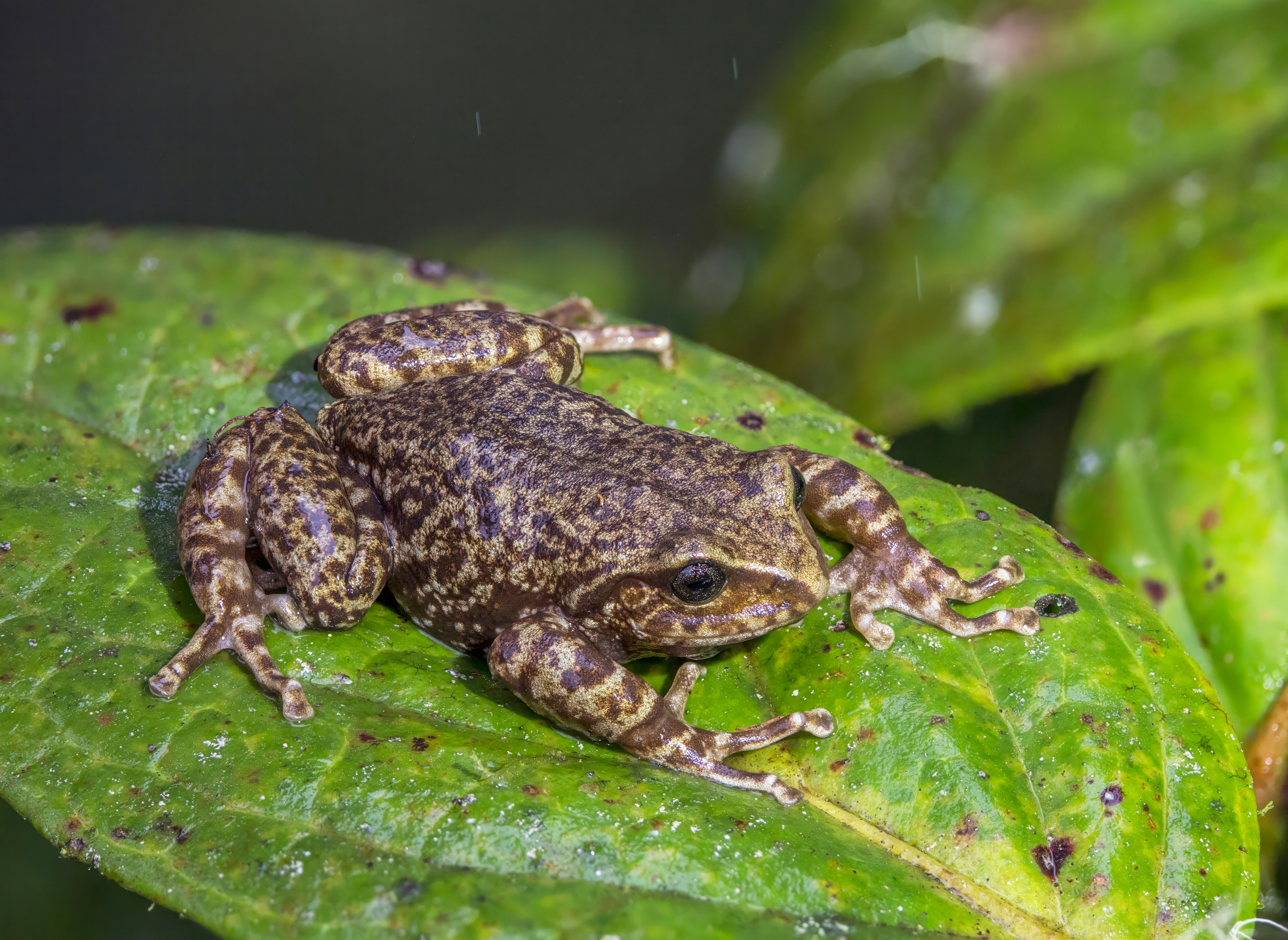
- P. elegans, Colombia
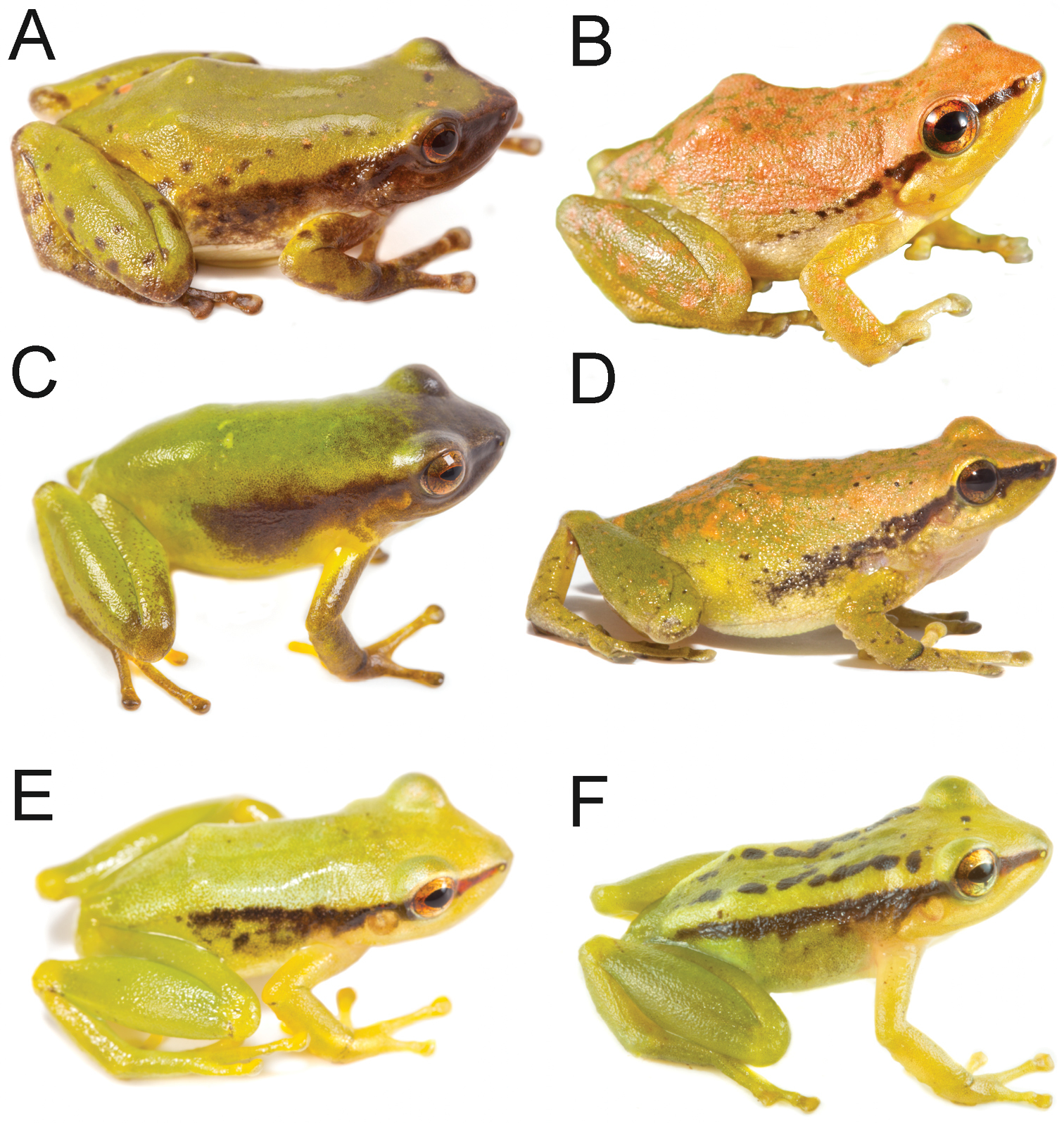
- (A) Pristimantis acuminatus, (B) Pristimantis limoncochensis, (C) Pristimantis enigmaticus, (D) Pristimantis omeviridis, (E) unknown species and (F) Pristimantis nankint.

Scientific classification
- Kingdom: Animalia
- Phylum: Chordata
- Class: Amphibia
- Order: Anura
- Clade: Brachycephaloidea
- Family: Craugastoridae
- Subfamily: Pristimantinae
- Genus: Pristimantis; Jiménez de la Espada, 1870

Type species
- Pristimantis galdi Jiménez de la Espada, 1870

Diversity
- About 620 species, see list

= Pristimantis =

Genus of amphibians

Pristimantis is a very speciose genus of frogs distributed in the southern Caribbean islands (Lesser Antilles) and in Central and South America from Honduras to northern Argentina and southern Brazil. With 626 described species (as of February 2026), the genus has more species than any other vertebrate genus. Many of these species are endemic to the Northwestern Andean montane forests ecoregion in north-western South America.

== Etymology ==
The genus name is derived from the Greek πρίστις (serrated) and μάντις (arboreal frog).

== Taxonomy ==
Placement of this genus has varied greatly. Pristimantis was long included in the massive genus Eleutherodactylus, and considered part of the family Leptodactylidae. Currently, the genus is placed in subfamily Pristimantinae, which in turn is placed in either family Craugastoridae or Strabomantidae.

The genus was established in 1870 with the description of Pristimantis galdi. It was then placed under synonymy with Hylodes in 1882. In 1955, it was moved under synonymy with Eleutherodactylus along with several other genera. In 2007, it was removed from the genus under the basis of molecular evidence.

=== Species ===
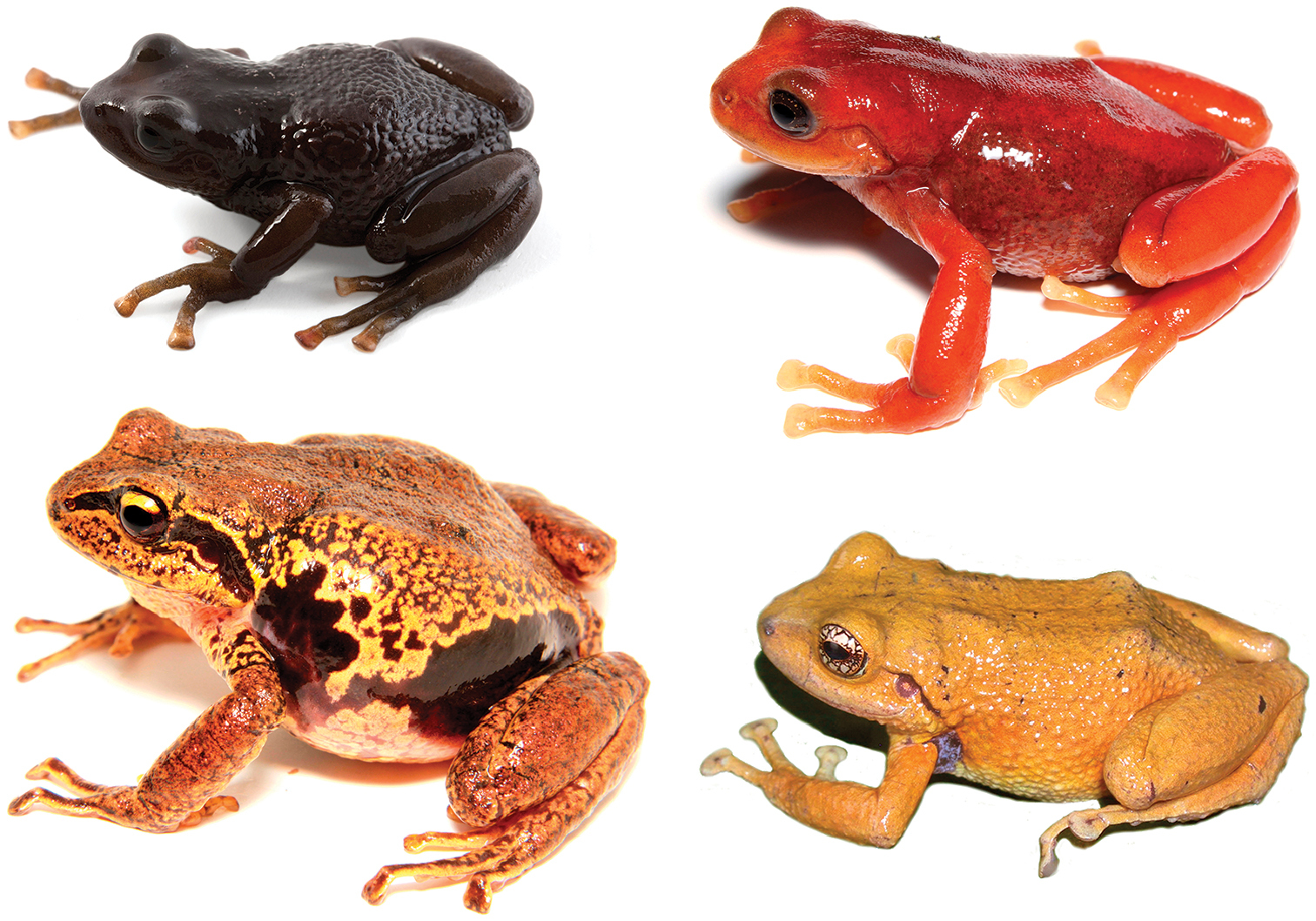
Pristimantis orcesi, Pristimantis erythros, Pristimantis pycnodermis and Pristimantis loujosti.

As of February 2026, there are 626 Pristimantis species recognised with new ones continuing to be described on a regular basis with the number of species discovered annually increasing over the last 50 years. The year 2025 alone saw the description of 10 new species. This makes this genus one of the most diverse groups of vertebrates. The greatest diversity of species can be found in the northern Andes of South America (eastern slopes of Ecuador).

=== Evolutionary history ===
This genus diverged around 37 million years ago during the Eocene epoch. Then this genus went through an explosive diversification event around 24 million years ago during the Oligocene epoch.
