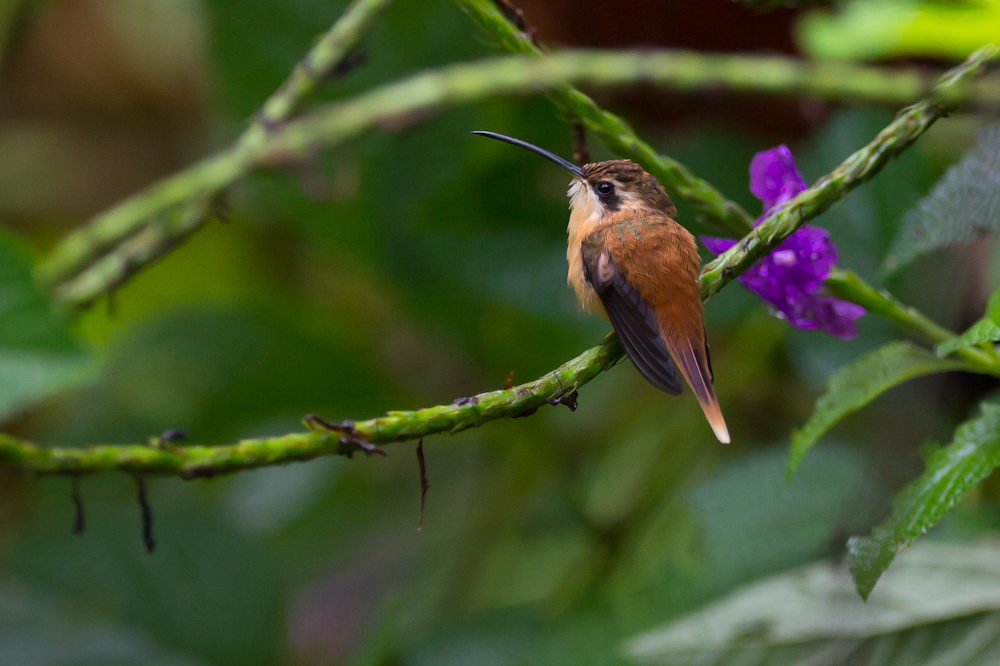

Conservation status
- Least Concern (IUCN 3.1)
- CITES Appendix II (CITES)

Scientific classification
- Kingdom: Animalia
- Phylum: Chordata
- Class: Aves
- Clade: Strisores
- Order: Apodiformes
- Family: Trochilidae
- Genus: Phaethornis
- Species: P. ruber

Binomial name
- Phaethornis ruber (Linnaeus, 1758)

Synonyms
- Trochilus ruber Linnaeus, 1758

= Reddish hermit =

Species of hummingbird

The reddish hermit (Phaethornis ruber) is a species of bird in the family Trochilidae, the hummingbirds. It is found in Bolivia, Brazil, Colombia, Ecuador, Peru, Venezuela, and the Guianas.

== Taxonomy and systematics ==
In 1743 the English naturalist George Edwards included a picture and a description of the reddish hermit in his A Natural History of Uncommon Birds. He used the English name "The little brown huming-bird". Edwards based his etching on a specimen owned by the Duke of Richmond that had been collected in Suriname. When in 1758 the Swedish naturalist Carl Linnaeus updated his Systema Naturae for the tenth edition, he placed the reddish hermit with the hummingbirds in the genus Trochilus. Linnaeus included a brief description, coined the binomial name Trochilus ruber, and cited Edwards' work. The specific epithet ruber is a Latin word meaning "red". The type locality is Suriname. The reddish hermit is now placed in the genus Phaethornis that was introduced in 1827 by William Swainson. The reddish hermit has sometimes been considered conspecific with the white-browed hermit (P. stuarti).

Four subspecies are recognised:

- P. r. episcopus Gould, 1857
- P. r. ruber (Linnaeus, 1758)
- P. r. nigricinctus Lawrence, 1858
- P. r. longipennis Berlepsch & Stolzmann, 1902

Some introgression has been noted between the nominate P. r. ruber and P. r. longipennis. P. r. episcopus and P. r. nigricinctus might actually be separate species but data to confirm the hypothesis are lacking. The population of P. r. ruber in southeastern Brazil has been proposed as a separate subspecies P. r. pygmaeus but its apparent differences are within the range of variation in the rest of ruber.

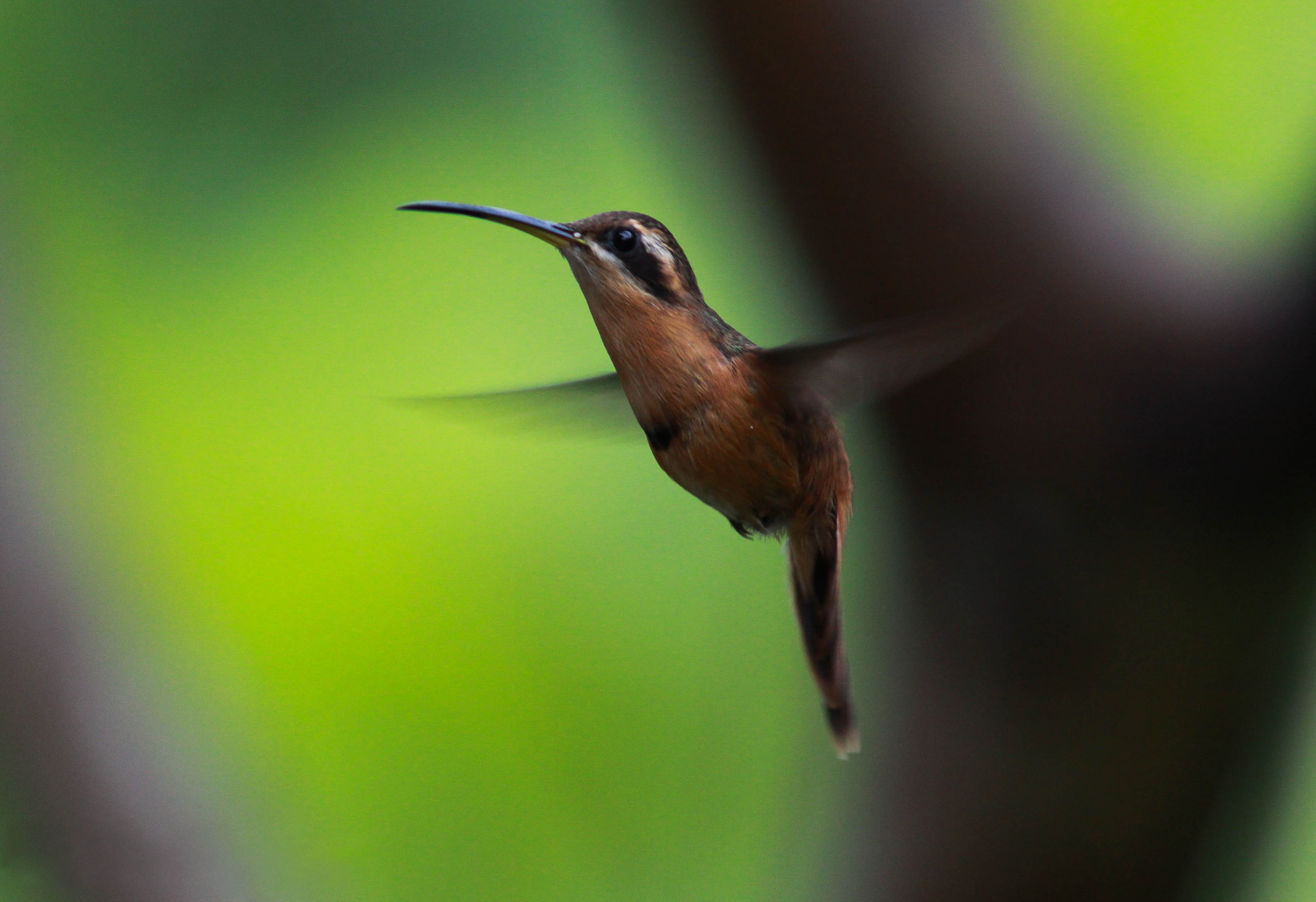

== Description ==
The reddish hermit is 8 to 9 cm (3.1 to 3.5 in) long and weighs 1.8 to 3 g (0.06 to 0.11 oz). All subspecies are generally dark green and rufous on the upperparts and cinnamon rufous on the underparts. Males have a black band on the chest and the tail feather have narrow white or reddish tips. Females have lighter underparts than the males. P. r. episcopus is about the same size as the nominate but has orange-rufous rather than cinnamon-rufous underparts and white tips to the tail. P. r. nigricinctus is the smallest subspecies; it has the richest rufous underparts. P. r. longipennis is the largest subspecies. It has a whitish chin and its central tail feathers have rufous tips.

== Distribution and habitat ==
The subspecies of reddish hermit are distributed thus:

- P. r. episcopus, central and eastern Venezuela, Guyana, and northwestern Brazil's Roraima state
- P. r. ruber, Suriname and French Guiana through Brazil as far south as northern Paraná state and in the west to southeastern Peru and northern Bolivia.
- P. r. nigricinctus, eastern and southern Colombia and extreme southwestern Venezuela south through eastern Ecuador into northeastern Peru and northwestern Brazil.
- P. r. longipennis, southeastern Peru from the department of Pasco to northern Cuzco.

== Behavior ==
=== Movement ===
The reddish hermit is assumed to be sedentary.

=== Feeding ===
The reddish hermit is a "trap-line" feeder like other hermit hummingbirds, visiting a circuit of many species of flowering plants for nectar. It also consumes small arthropods. Nectar robbing by piercing the base of a flower has been regularly observed in southeastern Brazil.

=== Breeding ===
The reddish hermit's breeding seasons vary throughout its large range; in general in the north it is within May to October and in the south within October to February. The nest is a cone-shaped cup made of plant fibers, mosses, lichens, other plant material, and spider web. It is attached under a drooping leaf. The clutch size is two eggs and the female alone incubates them.

=== Vocalization ===
The reddish hermit's song is "a high-pitched phrase repeated incessantly with clear pauses between phrases...evenly-spaced, slightly descending, single notes followed by a number of accelerating descending notes, e.g. 'tsee....tsee...tsee...tsee.tse.tsitsi'." It frequently sings for long periods at leks. It has "long whining calls" made while hovering and a "stip!" flight call.

== Status ==
The IUCN has assessed the reddish hermit as being of Least Concern, though its population size is unknown and is believed to be decreasing. It has a very large range, is considered "locally common to abundant", and occurs in several protected areas.
