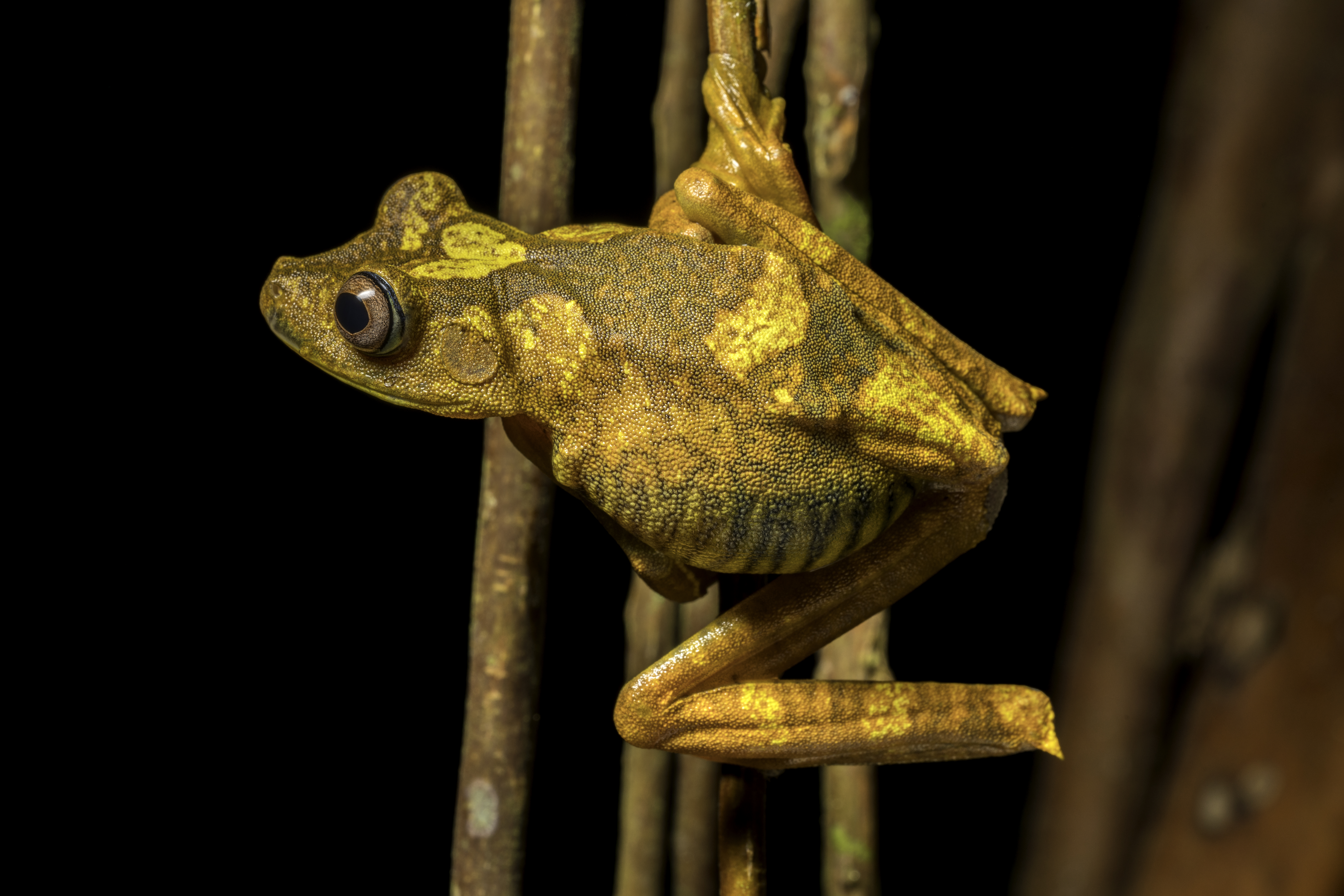

Conservation status
- Least Concern (IUCN 3.1)

Scientific classification
- Kingdom: Animalia
- Phylum: Chordata
- Class: Amphibia
- Order: Anura
- Family: Hylidae
- Genus: Boana
- Species: B. geographica

Binomial name
- Boana geographica (Spix, 1824)

Synonyms
- Hypsiboas geographicus (Spix, 1824)

= Map tree frog =

Species of amphibian

The map tree frog (Boana geographica) is a species of frog in the family Hylidae found in Bolivia, Brazil, Colombia, Ecuador, French Guiana, Guyana, Peru, Suriname, Trinidad and Tobago, and Venezuela. Its natural habitats are subtropical or tropical dry forests, subtropical or tropical moist lowland forests, moist savanna, subtropical or tropical seasonally wet or flooded lowland grassland, rivers, freshwater lakes, intermittent freshwater lakes, freshwater marshes, plantations, rural gardens, heavily degraded former forests, ponds, and aquaculture ponds. It was previously known as Hyla geographica. The name comes from the reticulated map-like patterns on its eyelids (palpebrum). The black tadpoles congregate in dense clusters in ponds or other calm waters.

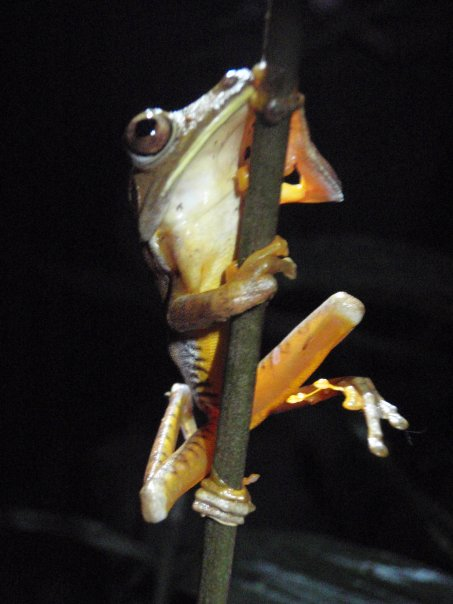

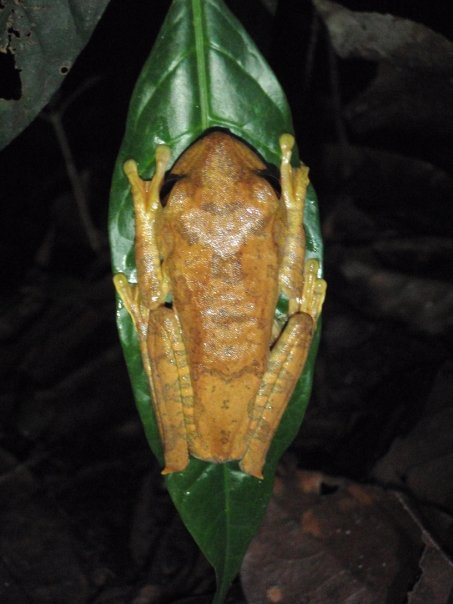
Back view
