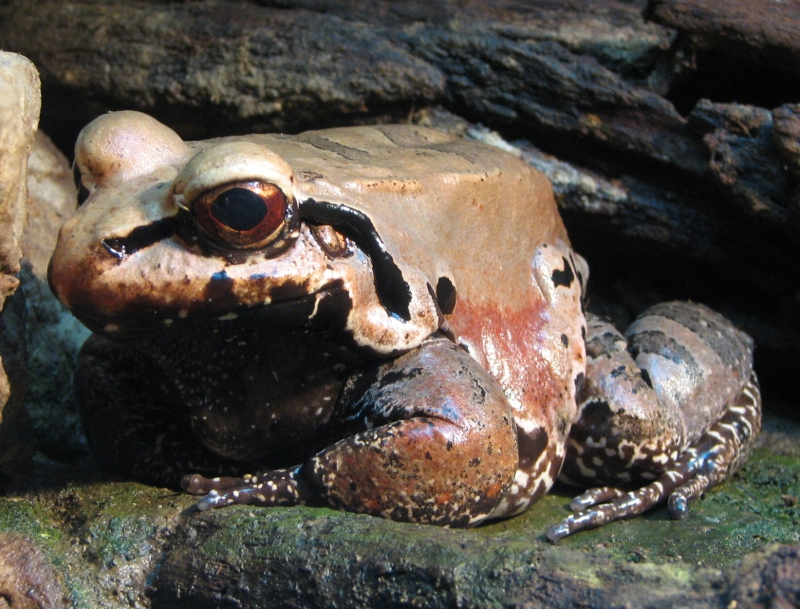

Conservation status
- Least Concern (IUCN 3.1)

Scientific classification
- Kingdom: Animalia
- Phylum: Chordata
- Class: Amphibia
- Order: Anura
- Family: Leptodactylidae
- Genus: Leptodactylus
- Species: L. pentadactylus

Binomial name
- Leptodactylus pentadactylus (Laurenti, 1768)

= Smoky jungle frog =

Species of amphibian

The smoky jungle frog (Leptodactylus pentadactylus) is a species of frog in the family Leptodactylidae. It is found in northern South America as well as parts of Central America. Its natural habitats are tropical and subtropical moist broadleaf forests, subtropical or tropical swamps, subtropical or tropical moist montane forest, rivers, freshwater marshes, intermittent freshwater marshes, and aquaculture ponds.

== Names ==
It is called huwa in the Kwaza language of Rondônia, Brazil.

== Physical characteristics ==
Males of this large, robust frog are slightly larger than females; they attain a maximum snout-vent length of 18.0 cm (7.1 in), whereas the maximum length in females is 17.6 cm (6.9 in).

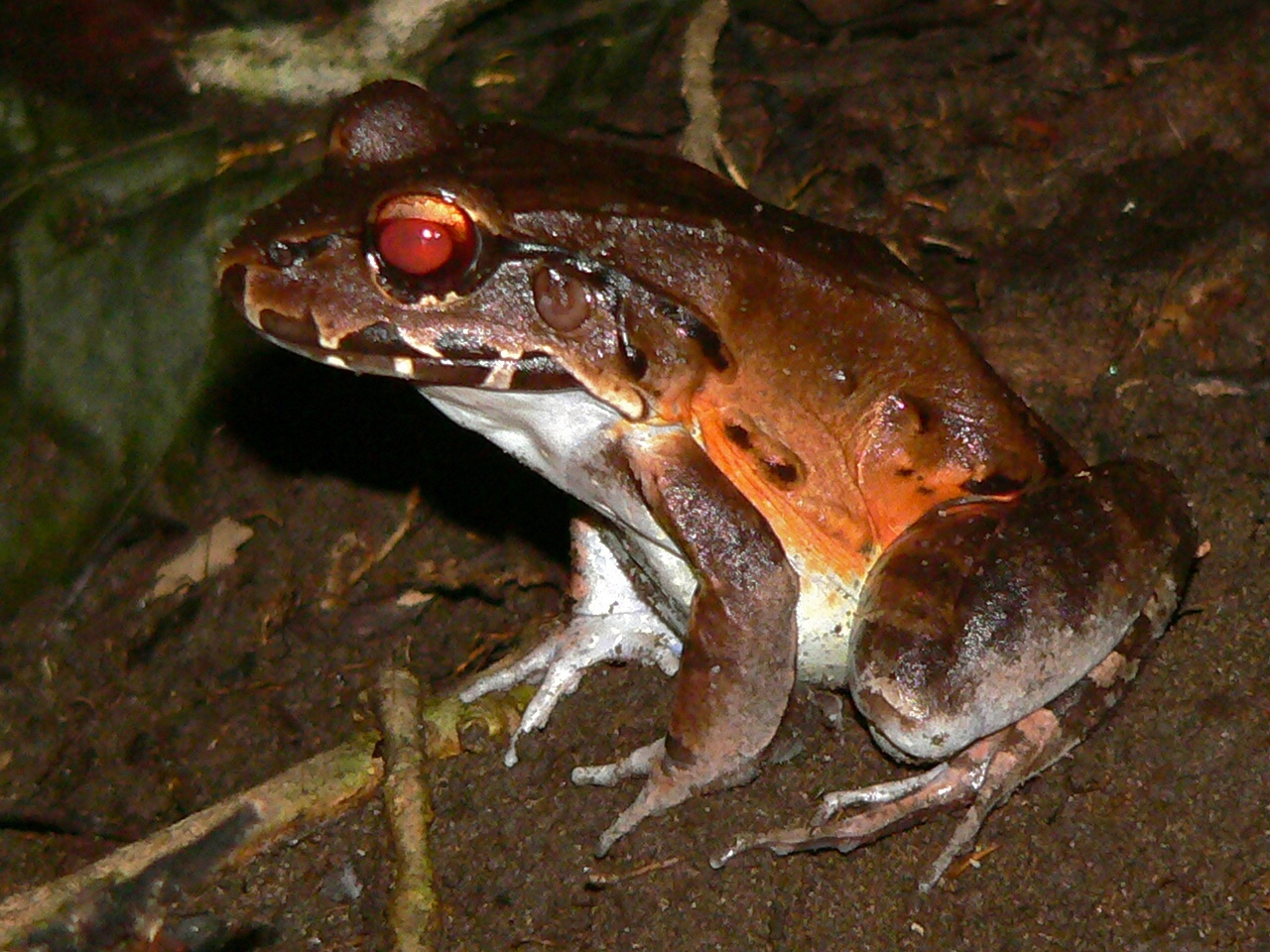
Tortuguero National Park, Costa Rica

The body is robust; the head is large with an acutely rounded snout and prominent tympanum. The skin on the dorsum and venter is smooth, and a prominent dorsolateral dermal fold extends from the orbit to the groin. The fingers and toes are long with slender tips and lack webbing. Breeding males have greatly swollen forelimbs and one large, pointed, black spine on the inner surface of the thumb and two black spines on each side of the chest. The dorsum is tan to reddish brown with broad, reddish brown marks on the body between the yellowish tan dorsolateral folds. The dorsal surfaces of the limbs are tan to reddish brown with narrow transverse brown bars. The upper lip is tan with a brown margin and dark brown triangular spots. The venter is cream with bold dark brown to black mottling, especially on the belly and hind limbs. The iris is bronze.

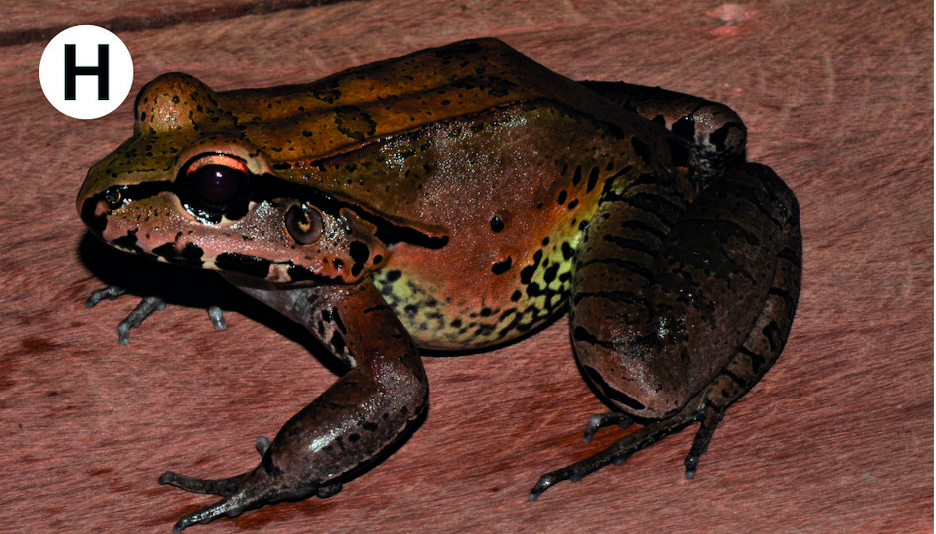
Amapá, Brazil

== Distribution ==
This frog ranges in lowlands below 1,200 m (3,900 ft) from Costa Rica to the Pacific lowlands of Ecuador and throughout the Guianas and northern two-thirds of the Amazon Basin in South America.

(Cited in: Amphibians and Reptiles of Costa Rica, by Twan Leenders, Zona Tropical, Miami, FL. 2001.)

== Habitat ==
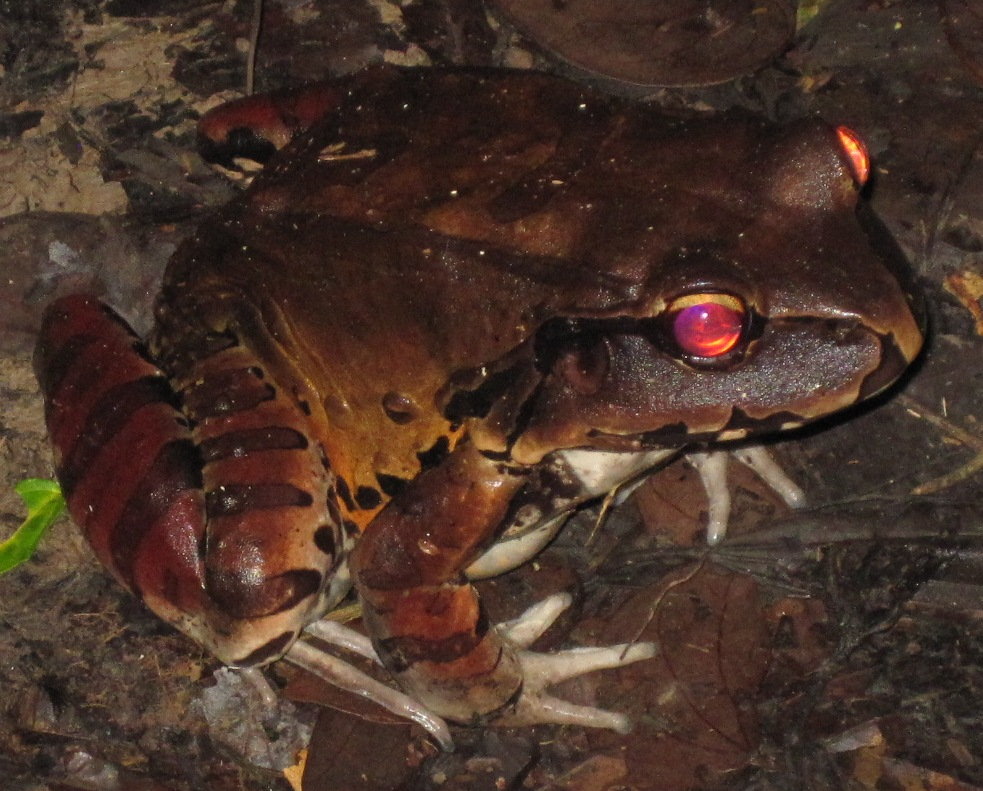
In leaf litter at night, Amazon rainforest, near Nauta, Peru, 2011

Principally a denizen of tropical rainforest, this species also invades dry forest and lower montane forests.

== Behavior ==
This nocturnal species spends its days in burrows, under logs, or hidden in leaf litter. Defensive mechanisms include noxious skin secretions and posturing by inflating the lungs and elevating the body on all four limbs. When grasped, these frogs usually emit a high-pitched scream.

== Feeding ecology and diet ==
Juveniles feed on small arthropods, but large adults feed on large arthropods, frogs, lizards, snakes, and small birds and mammals such as Seba's short-tailed bats. Tadpoles are omnivorous, feeding on vegetation, tadpoles, and eggs, even of their own species.

== Reproductive biology ==
Males call solitarily from margins of ponds and backwaters of streams; the call is a loud "whoorup" repeated at intervals of five to 10 seconds. An attracted female is grasped by the male by axillary amplexus and held firmly by the muscular forearms and nuptial spines on the thumbs and chest. About 1,000 eggs are deposited in a large foam nest by backward and forward motions of the male's hind limbs that mix air, water, eggs, and secretions into the nest, which usually is deposited in a depression adjacent to water. The eggs hatch in two to three days; subsequent rains flood the nest site, and the tadpoles move into the pond or slow-moving stream. Development is rapid, and metamorphosis occurs about four weeks after hatching. Tadpoles attain a maximum total length of about 3.3 in (83 mm). The body is ovoid with a rounded snout with large eyes directed dorsolaterally. The oral disc is nearly terminal and bears finely serrate jaw sheaths and two anterior and three posterior rows of labial teeth. The body and caudal musculature are brown.

== Toxicity ==
The skin of the smoky jungle frog contains leptoxin, a lethal protein toxin. As of 2008, the toxin's role is unknown.
