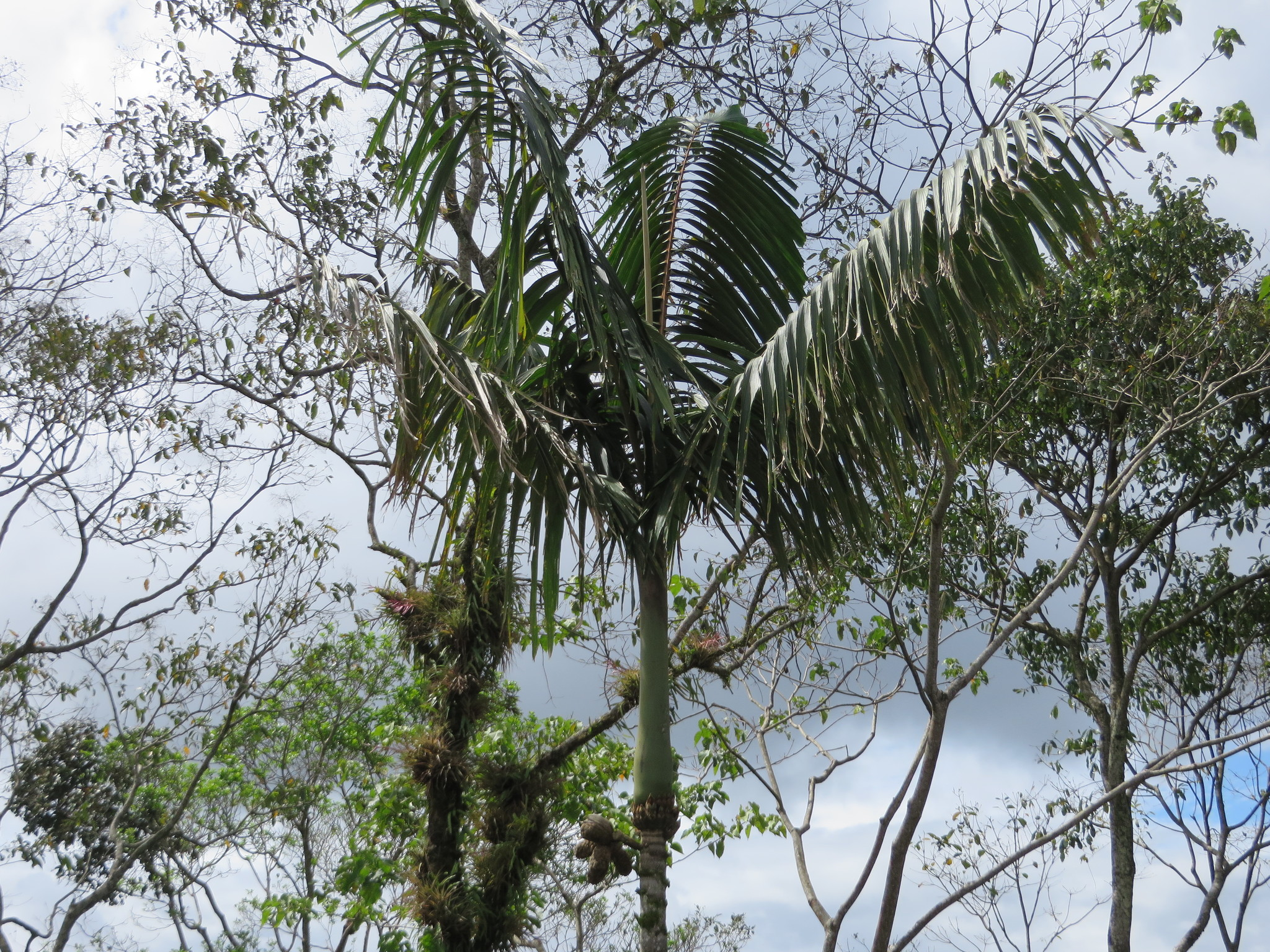
- Wettinia maynensis

Scientific classification
- Kingdom: Plantae
- Clade: Tracheophytes
- Clade: Angiosperms
- Clade: Monocots
- Clade: Commelinids
- Order: Arecales
- Family: Arecaceae
- Subfamily: Arecoideae
- Tribe: Iriarteeae
- Genus: Wettinia; Poepp. ex Endl.

Species
- Some 20, see text

Synonyms
- Acrostigma O.F.Cook & Doyle; Catoblastus H.Wendl. Catostigma O.F.Cook & Doyle; Wettinella O.F.Cook & Doyle; Wettiniicarpus Burret

= Wettinia =

Genus of palms

Wettinia is a genus of flowering plants in the palm family Arecaceae. The genus, established in 1837, contains some 20 species, but more seem to await discovery considering that 4 species—W. aequatorialis, W. lanata, W. minima and W. panamensis—were described as late as 1995. The genus is broadly divided into two groups. One group has the fruits tightly packed, while the other, formerly classified as genus Catoblastus, has fruits scattered along the inflorescence branches. It is not known whether these groups are both monophyletic. The genus is named after Frederick Augustus II of Saxony, of the House of Wettin.

== Morphology ==
Palms of the genus Wettinia are monoecious, medium-sized to large, and typically solitary-trunked. They have a low, dense cone of brown or black stilt roots, and pinnate leaves. The rope-like inflorescences of the plant emerge from leathery spathes, and grow in a circular pattern around one or more trunk rings beneath the crown shaft. They are unisexual, fleshy, and cream colored or white. The fruit is small to medium-sized and elongated, green to bluish black in color. It grows either dispersed along the branches or in a tightly packed ellipsoid or sausage-like cylinder.

== Distribution ==
Members of this genus are found in Panama and in northern and northwestern South America (Venezuela, Colombia, Ecuador, Peru, Bolivia, northwestern Brazil). Although none of the species are frost-tolerant, they are found primarily in cooler and higher-altitude locations, up to 2,200 m (7,200 ft) in the case of Wettinia kalbreyeri, and are particularly prevalent along the foothills of the Andes.

== Species ==
Wettinia s. str. group:

- Wettinia aequatorialis R.Bernal – Ecuador
- Wettinia augusta Poepp. & Endl. – Colombia, Peru, Bolivia, northwestern Brazil
- Wettinia castanea H.E.Moore & J.Dransf. – Colombia
- Wettinia fascicularis (Burret) H.E.Moore & J.Dransf. – Colombia, Ecuador
- Wettinia hirsuta Burret – Colombia
- Wettinia lanata R.Bernal – Colombia
- Wettinia longipetala A.H.Gentry – Pasco region of Peru
- Wettinia minima R.Bernal – Ecuador
- Wettinia oxycarpa Galeano-Garcés & R.Bernal – Colombia, Ecuador
- Wettinia panamensis R.Bernal – Panama
- Wettinia quinaria (O.F.Cook & Doyle) Burret – Colombia, Ecuador
- Wettinia verruculosa H.E.Moore – Colombia, Ecuador

Catoblastus group:

- Wettinia aequalis (O.F.Cook & Doyle) R.Bernal – Colombia, Ecuador, Panama
- Wettinia anomala (Burret) R.Bernal – Colombia, Ecuador
- Wettinia disticha (R.Bernal) R.Bernal – Colombia
- Wettinia drudei (O.F.Cook & Doyle) A.J.Hend. – Colombia, Peru, Ecuador, northwestern Brazil
- Wettinia kalbreyeri (Burret) R.Bernal – Colombia, Ecuador
- Wettinia maynensis Spruce – Peru, Colombia, Ecuador
- Wettinia microcarpa (Burret) R.Bernal – Norte de Santander region of Colombia
- Wettinia praemorsa (Willd.) Wess.Boer – Colombia, Venezuela
- Wettinia radiata (O.F.Cook & Doyle) R.Bernal – Colombia, Panama
