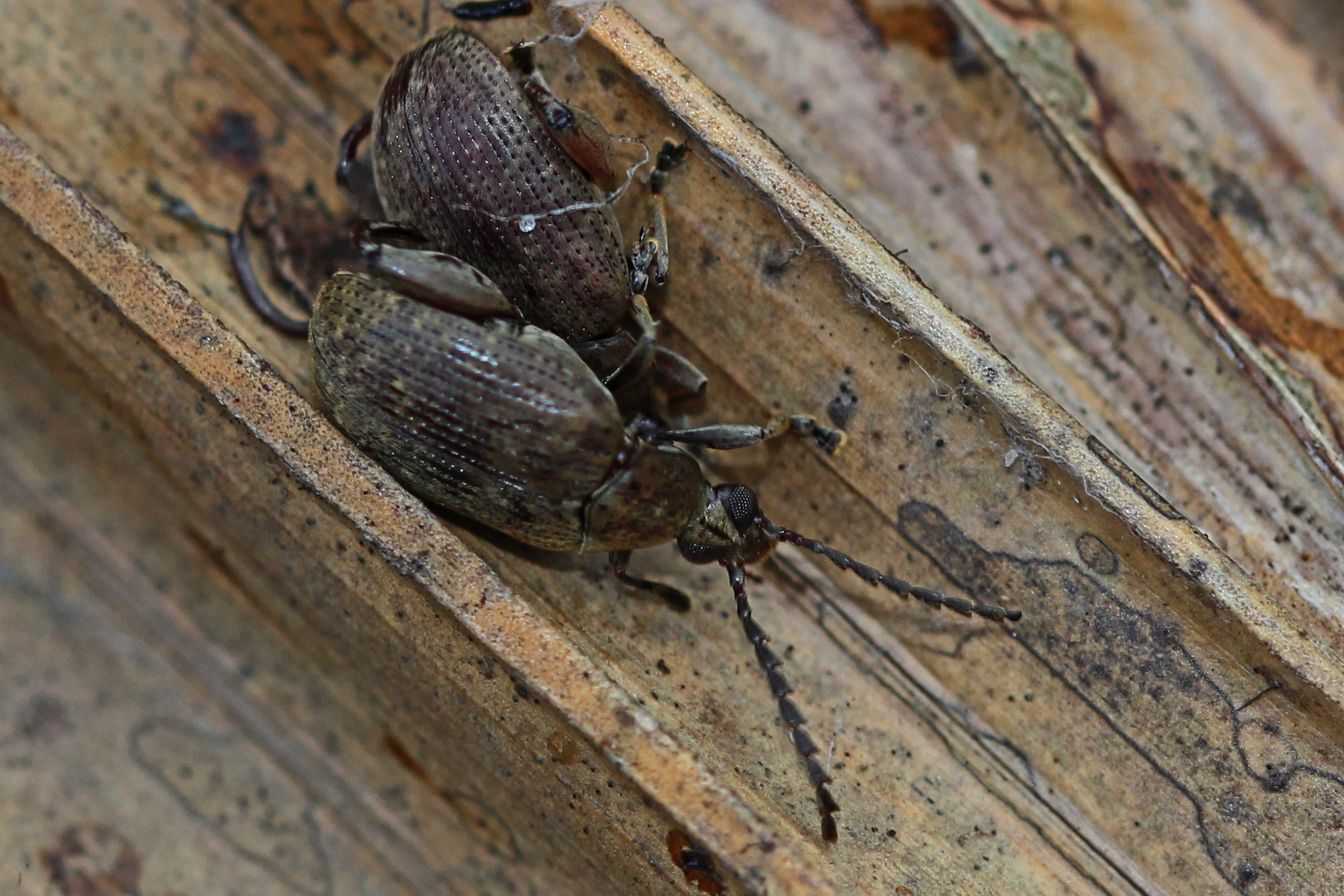
- Caryobruchus gleditsiae

Scientific classification
- Kingdom: Animalia
- Phylum: Arthropoda
- Class: Insecta
- Order: Coleoptera
- Suborder: Polyphaga
- Infraorder: Cucujiformia
- Family: Chrysomelidae
- Genus: Caryobruchus
- Species: C. gleditsiae

Binomial name
- Caryobruchus gleditsiae (Linnaeus, 1763)

Synonyms
- Dermestes gleditsiae Linnaeus, 1763; Bruchus gleditsiae (Linnaeus, 1763); Bruchus arthriticus Fabricius, 1801; Caryoborus arthriticus (Fabricius, 1801); Pachymerus gleditsiae (Linnaeus, 1763); Bruchus fuscus Goeze, 1777

= Caryobruchus gleditsiae =

Species of beetle

Caryobruchus gleditsiae is a species of beetle in the family Chrysomelidae (formerly Bruchidae). It lives in North and Central America and develops inside the seeds of palm trees. Adults grow to a maximum length of 11 mm (0.43 in), the size depending on the size of the seed it grew up in. The species was first described by Carl Linnaeus in his 1763 Centuria Insectorum.

== Description ==
Adult beetles are from 4 to 11 millimeters (0.16 to 0.43 in) long, with the body size depending on the size of the seed it grows in as a larva. It is the largest species of Bruchidae in the United States, although other species within the genus can reach 25 mm (0.98 in) long. The adults are black, with short grey hairs and scattered white spots on the elytra.

== Distribution ==
Caryobruchus gleditsiae is found in the southeastern United States, Mexico, Central America, the West Indies and the Bahamas. A closely related species, Caryobruchus mariae, is found on Cuba. Another closely related species, Caryobruchus maya, is found in southern Mexico, Belize and Guatemala.

== Ecology ==
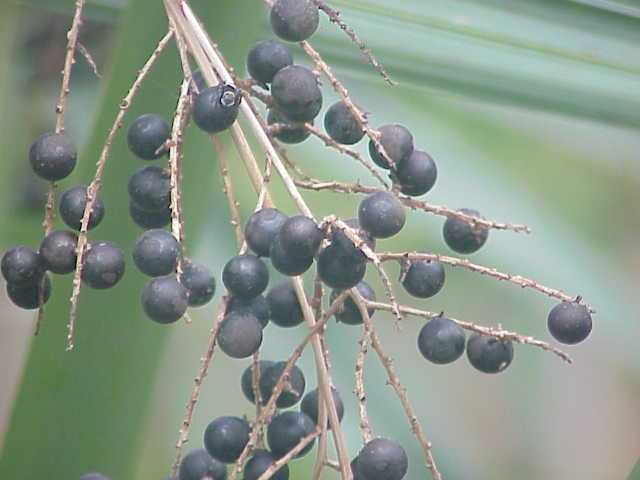
C. gleditsiae feeds on the seeds of Sabal minor

While most members of the beetle subfamily Bruchinae (sometimes called the "pea and bean weevils") feed on legumes, Caryobruchus and its relatives in the tribe Pachymerini feed on palm trees and are known as "palm seed weevils".

The female beetle lays a single egg on the outside of a palm seed. Eggs are only laid on a seed if it has had the exocarp and mesocarp removed, probably by rodents, revealing the smooth endocarp (see fruit anatomy). The larva that hatches out has sharp, heavy mandibles; which it uses to bore into the hard palm seed.

Recorded host plants for C. gleditsiae encompass a variety of Sabal species (including S. bermuda, S. causiarum, S. domingensis, S. etonia, S. glabra, S. longipedunculata, S. mexicana, S. minor, S. palmetto, S. parviflora, S. rosei, S. uresana and S. yapa) as well as other palm species, such as Coccothrinax argentata, Copernicia sp., Phoenix sylvestris, Livistona chinensis, Roystonea sp., Thrinax microcarpa and Washingtonia filifera. C. gleditsiae has no known natural enemies.

== Taxonomic history ==
Caryobruchus gleditsiae was first described by Carl Linnaeus in his 1763 work Centuria Insectorum, under the name Dermestes gleditsiae. The specific epithet gleditsiae refers to the plant honey locust (Gleditsia triacanthos), which was thought to be the beetle's host plant. The holotype has since been lost, and no neotype was designated when the species was re-described by Jan A. Nilsson & Clarence Dan Johnson in 1990.

Caryobruchus gleditsiae was transferred to its current genus by John Colburn Bridwell who erected the genus Caryobruchus in 1929, and designated C. gleditsiae as its "genotype" (type species).
