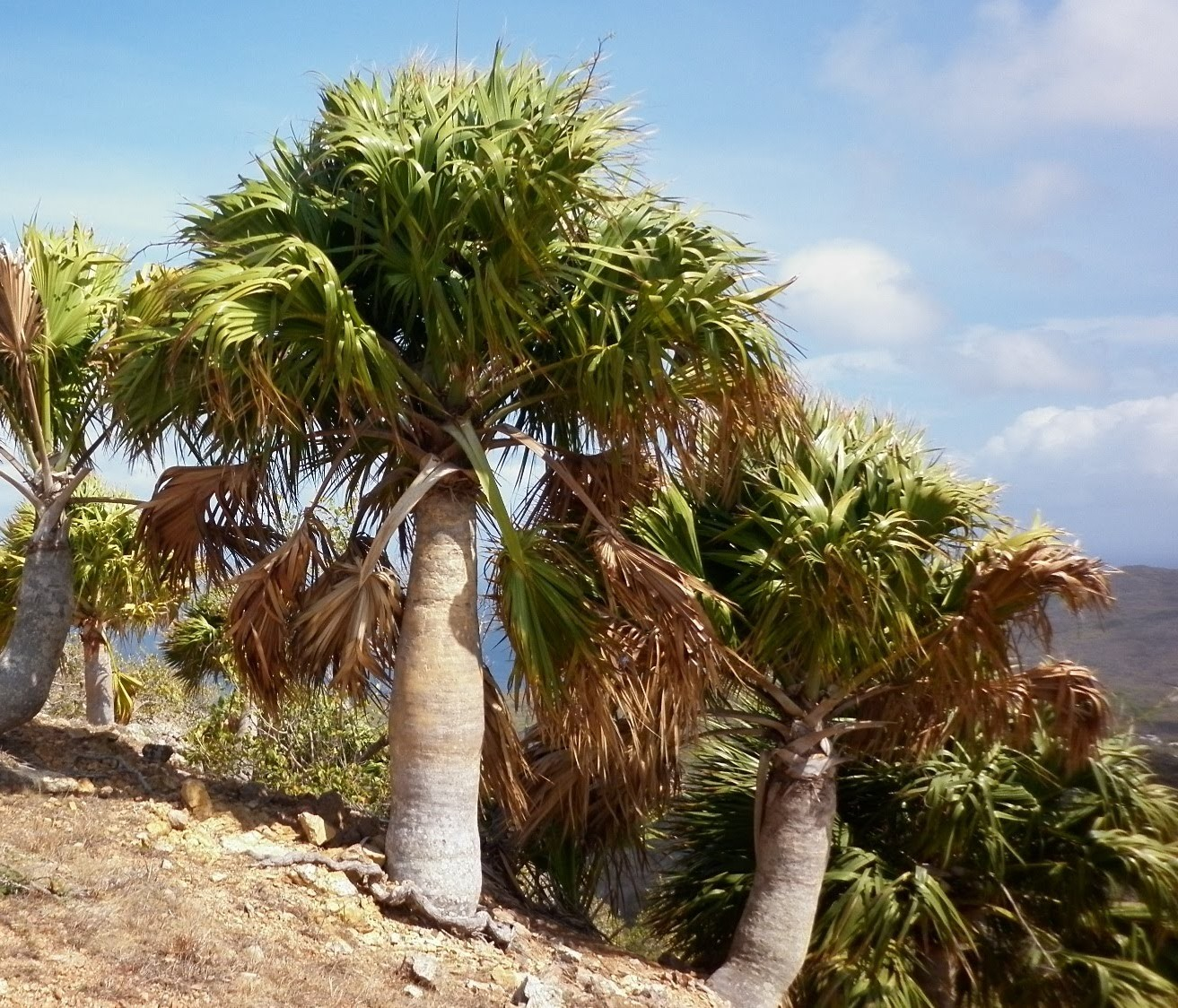

Scientific classification
- Kingdom: Plantae
- Clade: Embryophytes
- Clade: Tracheophytes
- Clade: Angiosperms
- Clade: Monocots
- Clade: Commelinids
- Order: Arecales
- Family: Arecaceae
- Genus: Sabal
- Species: S. antillensis

Binomial name
- Sabal antillensis M.P.Griff.

= Sabal antillensis =

Species of palm in the genus Sabal

Sabal antillensis, the Curaçao Kabana palm (Papiamento: kabana; Dutch: kabanapalm), is a species of palm in the genus Sabal. The species belongs to the Arecaceae (or Palmae) family, the only family in the order Arecales. It is endemic exclusively to the island of Curaçao. It occurs at higher elevations, primarily in the hills west of Christoffelberg.

== Description ==
Sabal antillensis reaches an average height of 4.5 m (15 ft), with some individuals growing up to 6 m (20 ft) tall. The palm grows solitarily—without clustering multiple trunks—featuring a relatively thick, sturdy trunk. The trunk, which generally tapers, reaches a height of up to 4 m (13 ft) and has a maximum diameter of just under half a meter (1.5 ft) at its widest point.

The leaves grow close together at the top of the stem, forming a compact crown of up to forty leaves. The grass-green leaf averages 1 to 2 meters in length, with the petiole being less than half the total leaf length. The leaves are strongly costapalmate, that is, fan-shaped (or palmate) with a distinct elongation of the midrib (or costa). The central part of the leaf, before segmentation begins, shows multiple undulations. Fine, fibrous thread structures run between the leaf segments.

The inflorescence (cluster of flowers) consists of curved, branched stems that grow upwards from the crown of leaves. These flowering stems can reach up to 1.5 m (5 ft) in length and sometimes extend above the leaves. They have many small branches with flowers. The flowers have no stalks; they are directly attached to the flowering stem. The flower of the Sabal antillensis is a few millimeters in size and predominantly white, with a green calyx and light yellow stamens. After flowering, the Sabal antillensis bears small, round, black fruit about 15 mm (0.6 in) in size. The fruit contain smooth, flattened spherical seeds 8–13 mm (0.3– 0.5 in) wide, with a brown to black color.

== Taxonomy ==
The species was scientifically unidentified until the twenty-first century.

In 1956, scientific literature reported an "unidentified species of the genus Sabal" found on a limestone terrace in the southern part of Bonaire, and a "not yet identified species of the genus Sabal" whose distribution area was limited to the north of Curaçao. In 1979, the species was identified as Sabal spec., an unexamined Sabal species that was classified as endemic to Bonaire and Curaçao. A scientific paper on Venezuelan palms in 1988 reported on Sabal mauritiiformis occurring on Bonaire and Curaçao.

Scientific research in 2012 gave the palms on Bonaire and Curaçao the provisional designation Sabal cf. causiarum, a name that made it clear that the investigated palms possibly belonged to the species Sabal causiarum but that uncertainty still existed regarding the exact identification.

More recent research in 2017 showed that these palms on Bonaire and Curaçao should be considered a new species: Sabal antillensis. A subsequent scientific publication appeared in 2019, identifying the Sabal palms on Bonaire as a distinct, endemic species: Sabal lougheediana. Since then, Sabal antillensis has been considered a species found exclusively on Curaçao. A genomic study published in 2024 confirmed the species's single-island endemism.

In the species's scientific name, the epithet antillensis refers to the Antilles, the groups of islands of which Curaçao is a part.

== Distribution and population ==
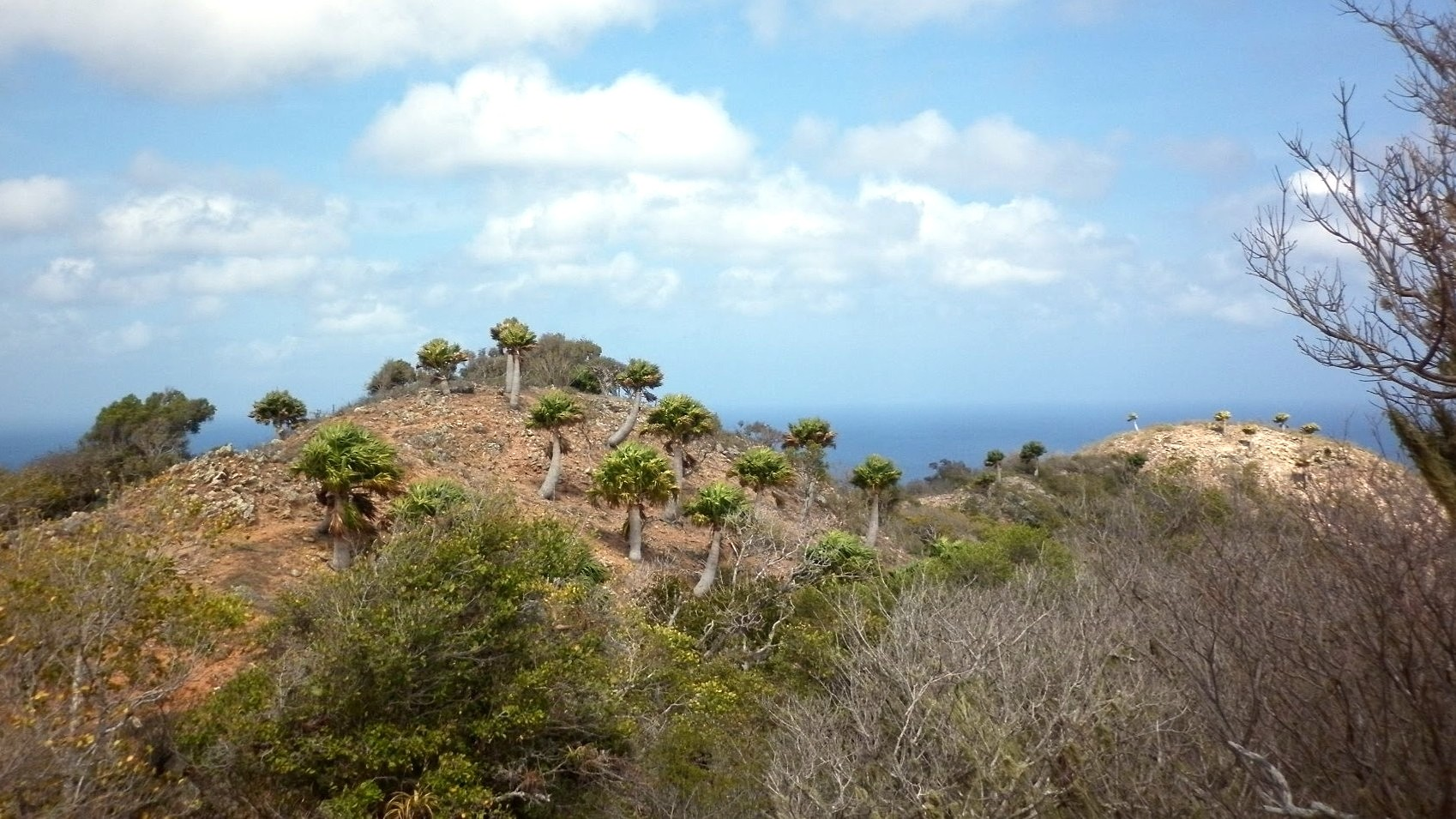
Sabal antillensis on a hill

Sabal antillensis grows mainly on and around the highest peaks of the hills west of Christoffelberg (Mount Christofftel) in Christoffelpark and just outside, at altitudes between 140–260 m (460-850 ft).

The exact number of Curaçao Kabana palms is unknown. In 1979, an extensive scientific study counted 323 mature, fertile specimens, in addition to several hundred young palms and seedlings. It was determined that the species needed protection against free-roaming, feral goats, which caused significant damage to the young growth. Due to active conservation and the removal of the goats from Christoffelpark, the population has grown steadily. The distribution area increased from 5 km² (1,235 acres) in 1979, to more than 8 km² (1,976 acres) in 2018. In 2018, 1,030 mature specimens were counted, along with several thousand young palms and seedlings. Additionally, in 2023, a previously unknown population was discovered on the eastern flank of Mount Christoffel.
