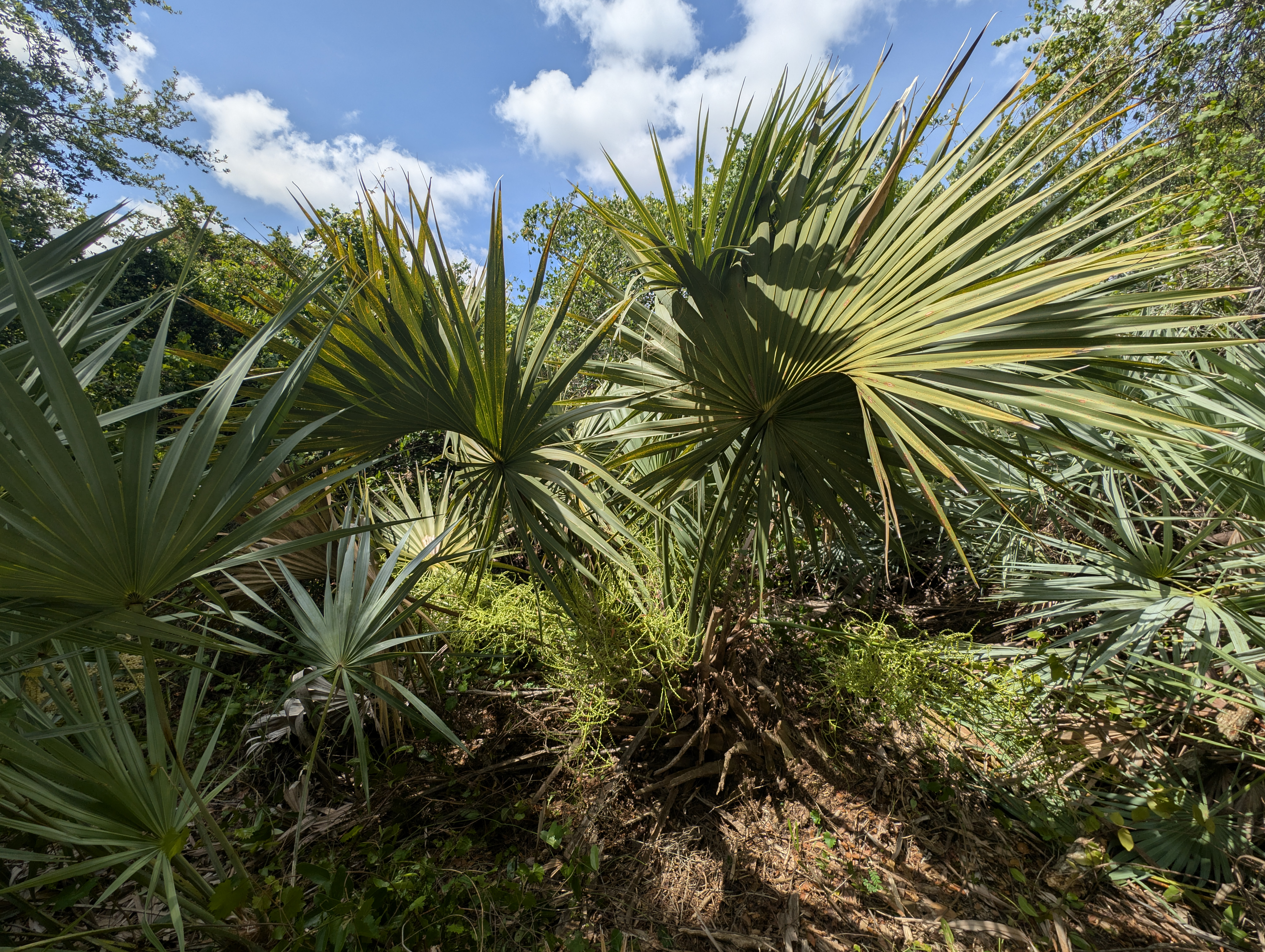

Conservation status
- Critically Imperiled (NatureServe)

Scientific classification
- Kingdom: Plantae
- Clade: Tracheophytes
- Clade: Angiosperms
- Clade: Monocots
- Clade: Commelinids
- Order: Arecales
- Family: Arecaceae
- Genus: Sabal
- Species: S. miamiensis

Binomial name
- Sabal miamiensis Zona

= Sabal miamiensis =

Miami palmetto

Species of palm

Sabal miamiensis, the Miami palmetto or Miami palm, is an endemic, critically imperiled palm species to Dade County, Florida, especially in the vicinity of the city of Miami. Sabal miamiensis was considered extinct in the wild until 2024.

== Taxonomy ==
The formal description of this species was published in 1985, based largely on specimens collected in 1901.

Plastid genome analysis and three different nuclear genome analysis show Sabal miamiensis is closely related to S. etonia, S. bermudana, and S. palmetto.

== Conservation ==
Only two populations are known. Both populations contain a few individuals each. Both locations are on public, protected land.

This palm species is considered critically endangered in its native habitat due to habitat destruction. It has been collected in nature only from rocky pinelands in the region, areas which are under intense pressure for urban development.

Following reports of very large-fruited sabal palmettos in a remnant habitat, a population of S. miamiensis was discovered and 45 seeds collected. These seeds were grown into seedlings for conservation purposes at the Montgomery Botanical Center. An additional wild population of S. miamiensis was discovered in 2025.

== Habitat ==
Sabal miamiensis grows in the pine rocklands on the Miami Rock Ridge of the South Florida rocklands. Features of the habitat include thin soils over the oolitic limestone of the Miami Limestone, an overstory of Florida slash pine (Pinus elliottii). The thin soil and porous limestone create a sharply draining catena. The pine rockland habitat is classified as imperiled. Outside of Everglades National Park, 98% of the pine rocklands in Florida have been converted to urban land uses, roads and highways, agriculture, and silviculture (pine plantations).

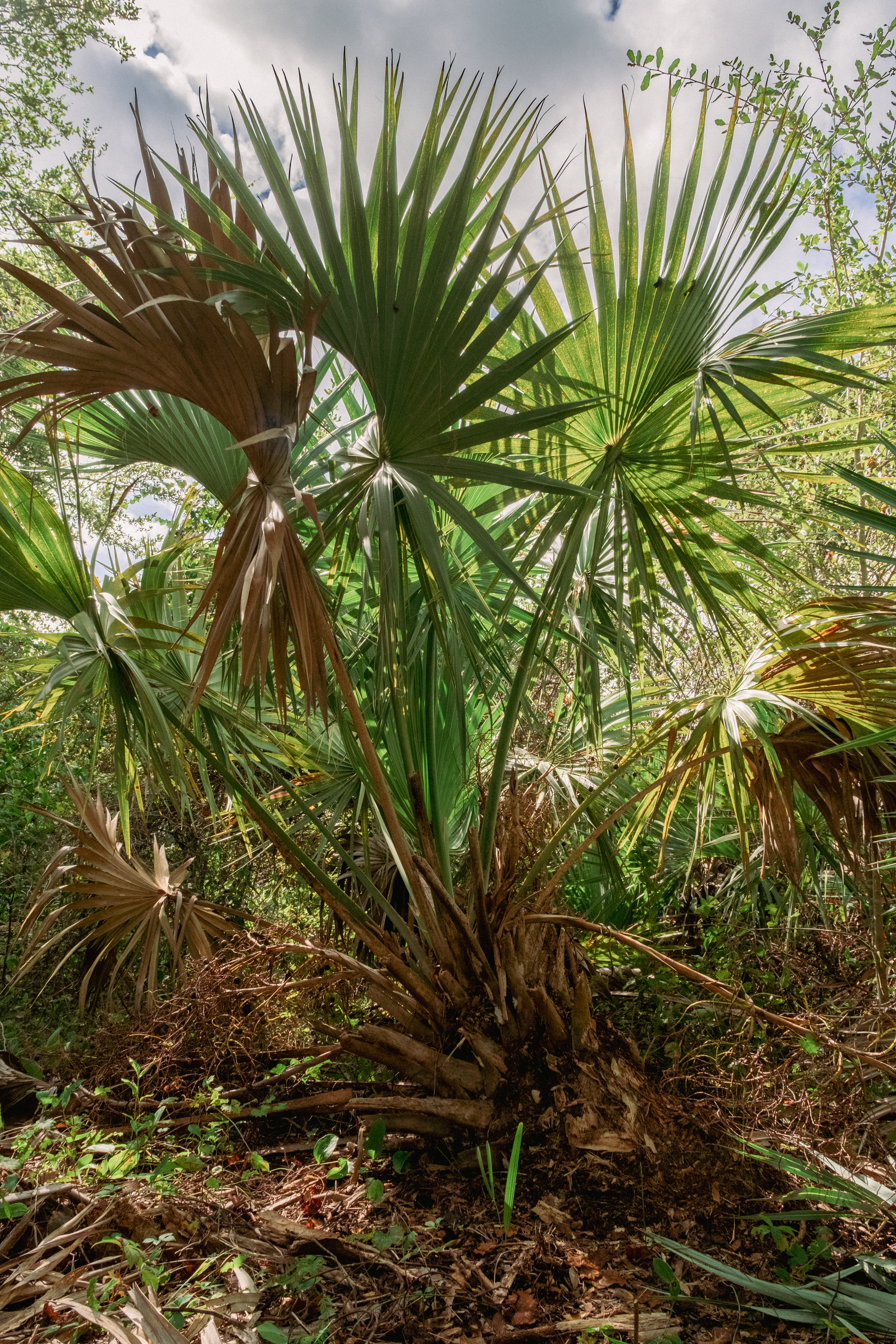
A fully grown specimen of Sabal miamiensis, showing the strongly costapalmate leaves and the acaulescent or barely caulescent trunk. The location is in native scrub vegetation. Mature fruits are visible.

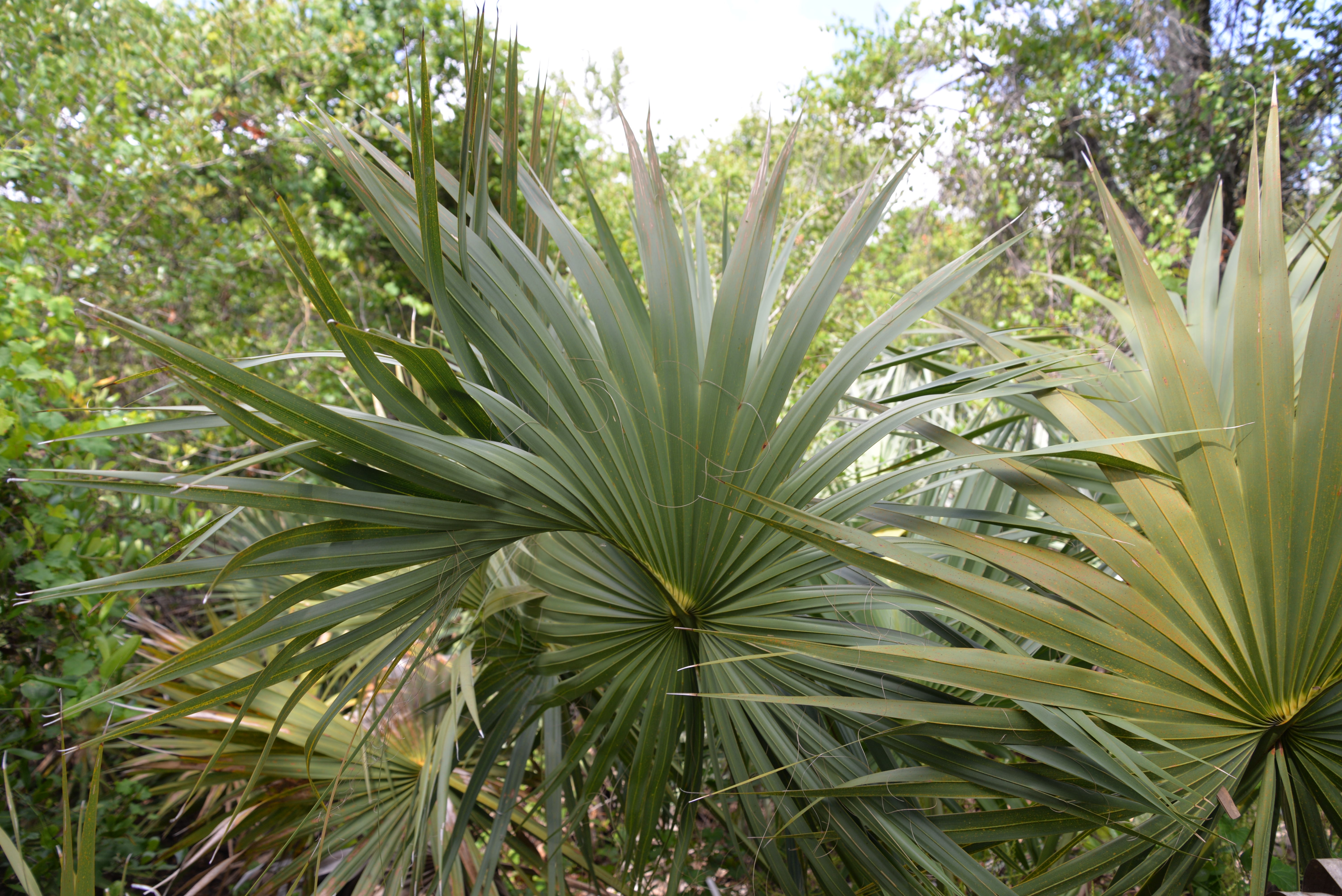
Detail of Sabal miamiensis leaf structure. The costapalmate leaf has a short, strong midrib and recurves distinctly. This specimen is from one of the two known wild populations of this palm.

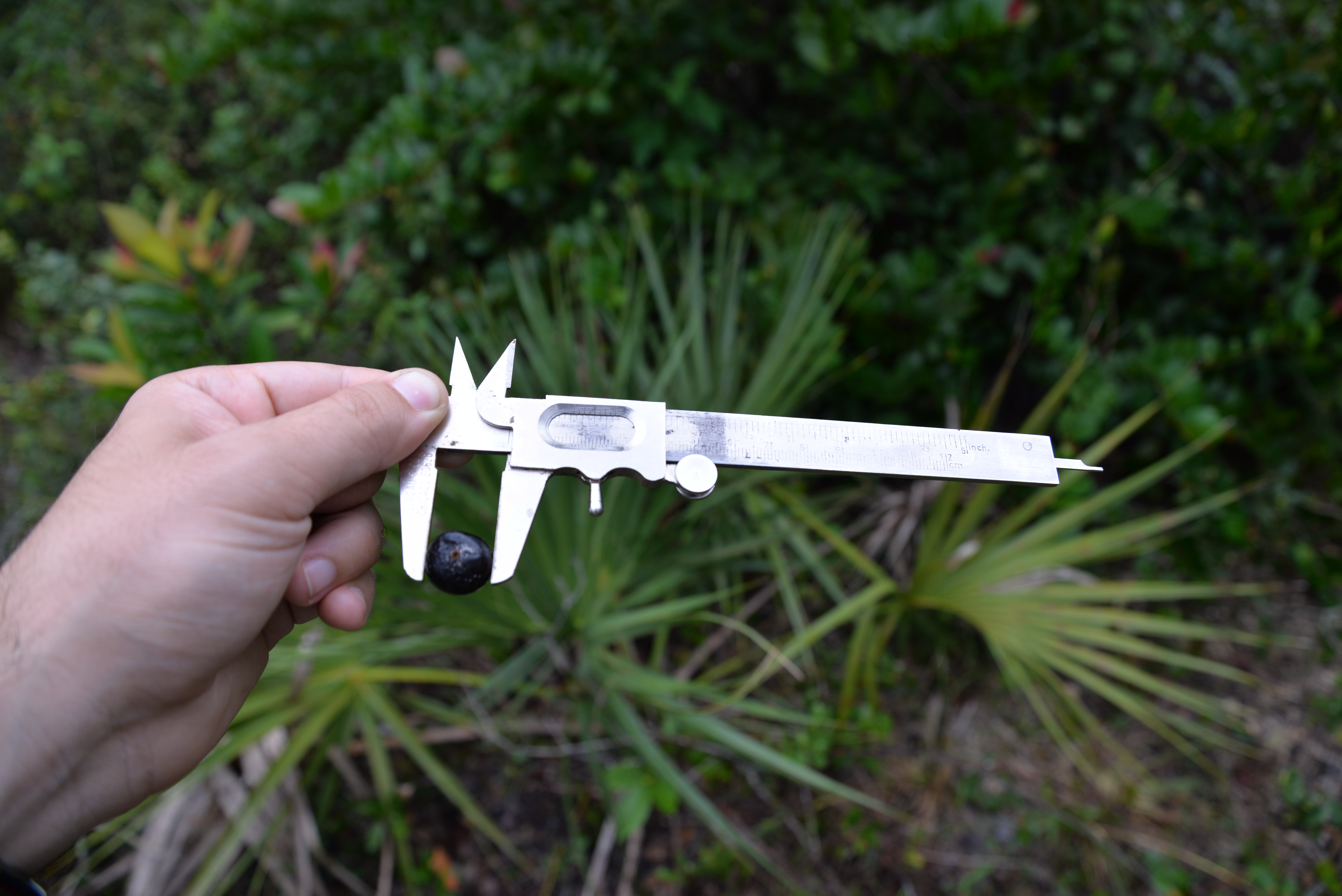
Detail showing the large size of Sabal miamiensis fruit. The blue-black, glossy palm fruit is held in a caliper showing the fruit size, 1.6 cm diameter.

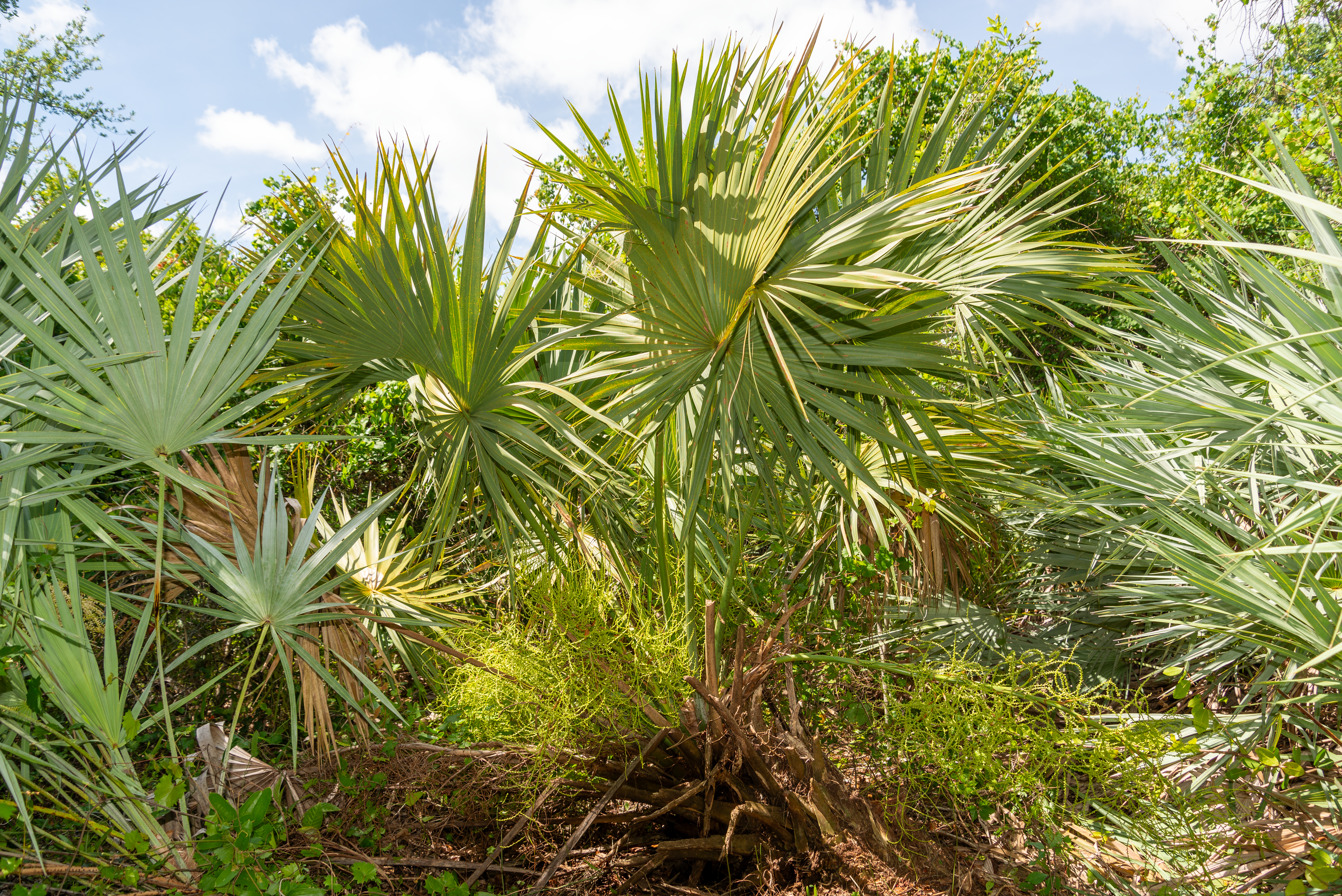
Sabal miamiensis specimen at the site where the species was rediscovered. This is the largest individual documented to date (2025). Flower buds are present.

== Description ==
Sabal miamiensis resembles S. etonia but has larger fruits (15–19 mm (0.59–0.75 in) in diameter) and an inflorescences with 3 orders of branching instead of 2. Stems are primarily subterranean, leaves no more than 6 per plant, each yellow-green and up to 85 cm (33.5 in) long. Flowers are creamy white, each 5-5.5 mm long. Fruits are black and fleshy.
