= S. maritima =

S. maritima may refer to:

- Sabal maritima, a palm species native to Jamaica and Cuba
- Spartina maritima, the small cordgrass, a cordgrass species native to the coasts of western and southern Europe and western Africa

== Synonyms ==
- Scilla maritima, a synonym for Urginea maritima

== See also ==
- Maritima (disambiguation)
