= Sabal lougheediana =

Conservation status
- Critically Endangered (IUCN 3.1)

Scientific classification
- Kingdom: Plantae
- Clade: Embryophytes
- Clade: Tracheophytes
- Clade: Angiosperms
- Clade: Monocots
- Clade: Commelinids
- Order: Arecales
- Family: Arecaceae
- Genus: Sabal
- Species: S. lougheediana

Binomial name
- Sabal lougheediana M.P.Griff. & Coolen

Critically endangered species of palm

Sabal lougheediana, the Bonaire palm (Papiamento: Palma di Boneiru or kabana, Dutch: Bonairepalm or kabana) is a species of palm in the genus Sabal. This species is endemic to Bonaire and was first described in 2019 by Griffith and Coolen. Previously, the Bonaire palm was classified in 2012 as Sabal causiarum and in 2017 as Sabal antillensis. However, genomic research has shown that the Bonaire palm is atypical and unique of its kind.

The species is characterized by a compact crown of leaves, upright leaf segments, prominent leaf scars, and often vascularized fiber bundles in the cross-section of the leaves.

The species is critically endangered; a very small population exists in the Bonairean landscape, consisting of 24 mature palms (2021). These palms are located west of Lac Bay in the Lima area, just north of the Cargill salt flats. Plans are underway to develop this area for ecotourism and to establish it as a protected park under the name Sabal Palm Park. In 2012, a fence was built around some or all of these palms to protect them from free-roaming goats.

In October 2021, 330 seedlings were planted on Klein Bonaire at the initiative of STINAPA Bonaire in collaboration with Bonaire National Marine Park.
