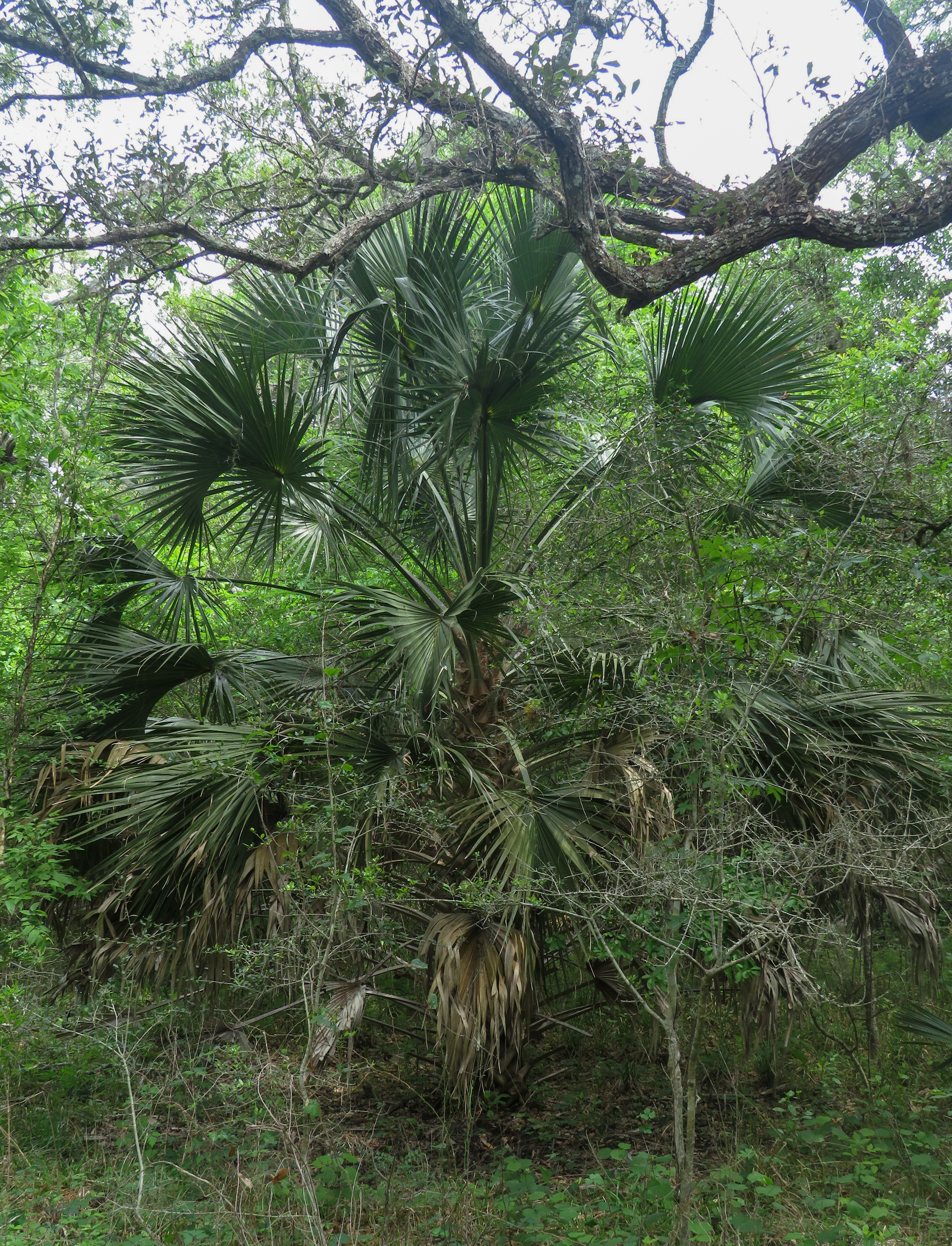

Scientific classification
- Kingdom: Plantae
- Clade: Tracheophytes
- Clade: Angiosperms
- Clade: Monocots
- Clade: Commelinids
- Order: Arecales
- Family: Arecaceae
- Genus: Sabal
- Species: S. brazoriensis

Binomial name
- Sabal brazoriensis D.H.Goldman, L.Lockett, & R.W.Read, 2011

Synonyms
- Sabal × brazoriensis Goldman et al.

= Sabal brazoriensis =

Brazoria palmetto

Species of palm

Sabal brazoriensis, also known as Sabal × brazoriensis, the Brazoria palmetto, or Brazoria palm is a species of palm tree endemic to the Texas Gulf Coast in the United States.

== Taxonomy ==
This species was originally thought to be a hybrid of Sabal minor (dwarf palmetto) and Sabal mexicana (Mexican palmetto). However, genetic assessments concluded that its lineage can be traced back to hybridization between S. minor and Sabal palmetto (cabbage palmetto). S. brazoriensis is considered a "species of hybrid origin" due to its genetic distinctness and isolation from the native range of S. palmetto, which only ventures to the Florida Panhandle at its western extent.

== Description ==
Sabal brazoriensis grows to heights of 2 to 7 metres (6.6 to 23.0 ft), with a trunk height of .3 to 5 metres (1 to 16 ft). Its leaves are moderately to strongly costapalmate reaching lengths of 2.5 metres (8.2 ft) with a max petiole length of 1.3 metres (4.3 ft). Its Inflorescences are generally 2 to 3 metres (7 to 10 ft) long, growing fragrant white flowers, .5 to .8 centimetres (0.20 to 0.31 in) wide. Fruits generally grow to be 8 to 10 millimetres (0.31 to 0.39 in) long.

== Distribution and habitat ==
This species is endemic to wet subtropical riparian forests in coastal southeastern Texas (almost entirely in Brazoria County), often referred to as the Colombia Bottomlands. The bulk of this ecosystem is housed in the San Barnard National Wildlife Refuge and is characterized by brackish and freshwater wetlands as well as forests adjacent to the Brazos and San Bernard rivers. Other trees that occur in this ecosystem include Quercus virginiana (southern live oak), Q. nigra (water oak), Fraxinus pennsylvanica (Green ash), Ulmus sp. (elms). and Ilex sp. (holly). Common understory plants include Malvaviscus drummondii (wax mallow), Rubus sp. (blackberry), Toxicodendron radicans (eastern poison ivy), and dwarf palmetto.
