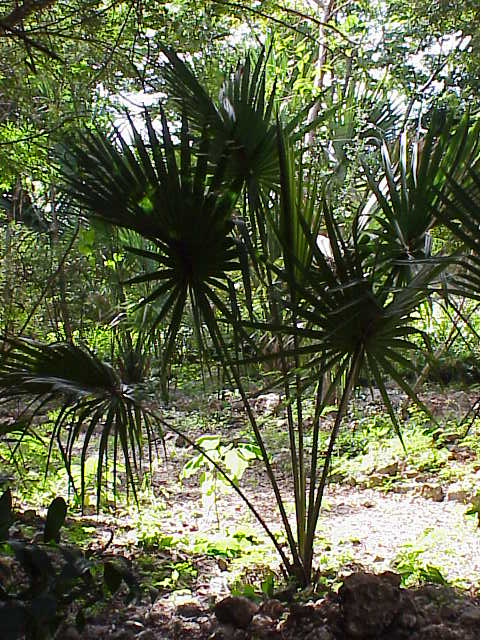

Conservation status
- Vulnerable (IUCN 2.3)

Scientific classification
- Kingdom: Plantae
- Clade: Tracheophytes
- Clade: Angiosperms
- Clade: Monocots
- Clade: Commelinids
- Order: Arecales
- Family: Arecaceae
- Genus: Sabal
- Species: S. gretheriae

Binomial name
- Sabal gretheriae Quero, 1991

= Sabal gretheriae =

Species of palm

Sabal gretheriae is a species of palm tree that is endemic to the state of Quintana Roo in Mexico, where it is threatened by habitat loss. It was described by Hermililo J. Quero in 1991. The specific epithet, "gretheriae", honors Rosaura Grether, a botanist who worked with Quero. It is very similar to the Mexican Palmetto (S. mexicana) and may be synonym of that species.
