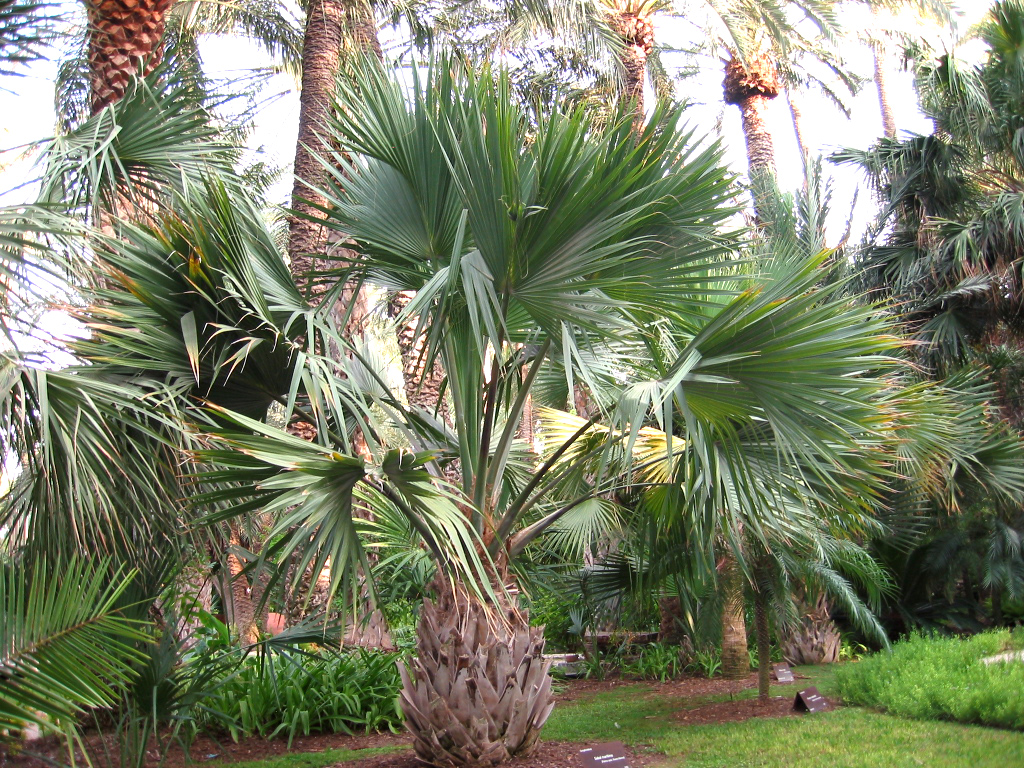
- Sabal maritima at Huerto del Cura botanic garden in Elche, Alicante, Spain

Scientific classification
- Kingdom: Plantae
- Clade: Tracheophytes
- Clade: Angiosperms
- Clade: Monocots
- Clade: Commelinids
- Order: Arecales
- Family: Arecaceae
- Genus: Sabal
- Species: S. maritima

Binomial name
- Sabal maritima (Kunth) Burret

Synonyms
- Corypha maritima Kunth; Sabal taurina Mart. Sabal florida Becc. Sabal jamaicensis Becc.

= Sabal maritima =

Species of palm

Sabal maritima is a species of palm which is native to Jamaica and Cuba.

== Description ==
Sabal maritima is a fan palm with solitary, stout stems, which grows up to 15 metres (49 ft) tall and 25–40 centimetres (10–16 in) in diameter. Plants have about 25 leaves, each with 70–110 leaflets. The inflorescences, which are branched and as long as the leaves, bear pear-shaped to globose, black fruit. The fruit are 0.8–1.4 centimetres (0.3–0.6 in) in diameter.

== Taxonomy ==
Sabal is placed in the subfamily Coryphoideae and the tribe Sabaleae. As of 2008, there appear to be no molecular phylogenetic studies of Sabal.

The species was first described by Carl Sigismund Kunth as Corypha maritima in 1816, based on collections made by Alexander von Humboldt and Aimé Bonpland. It was transferred to the genus Sabal by Italian naturalist Odoardo Beccari in 1933.

Andrew Henderson and colleagues noted that Sabal maritima, S. causiarum and S. domingensis form a species complex that may constitute a single species.
