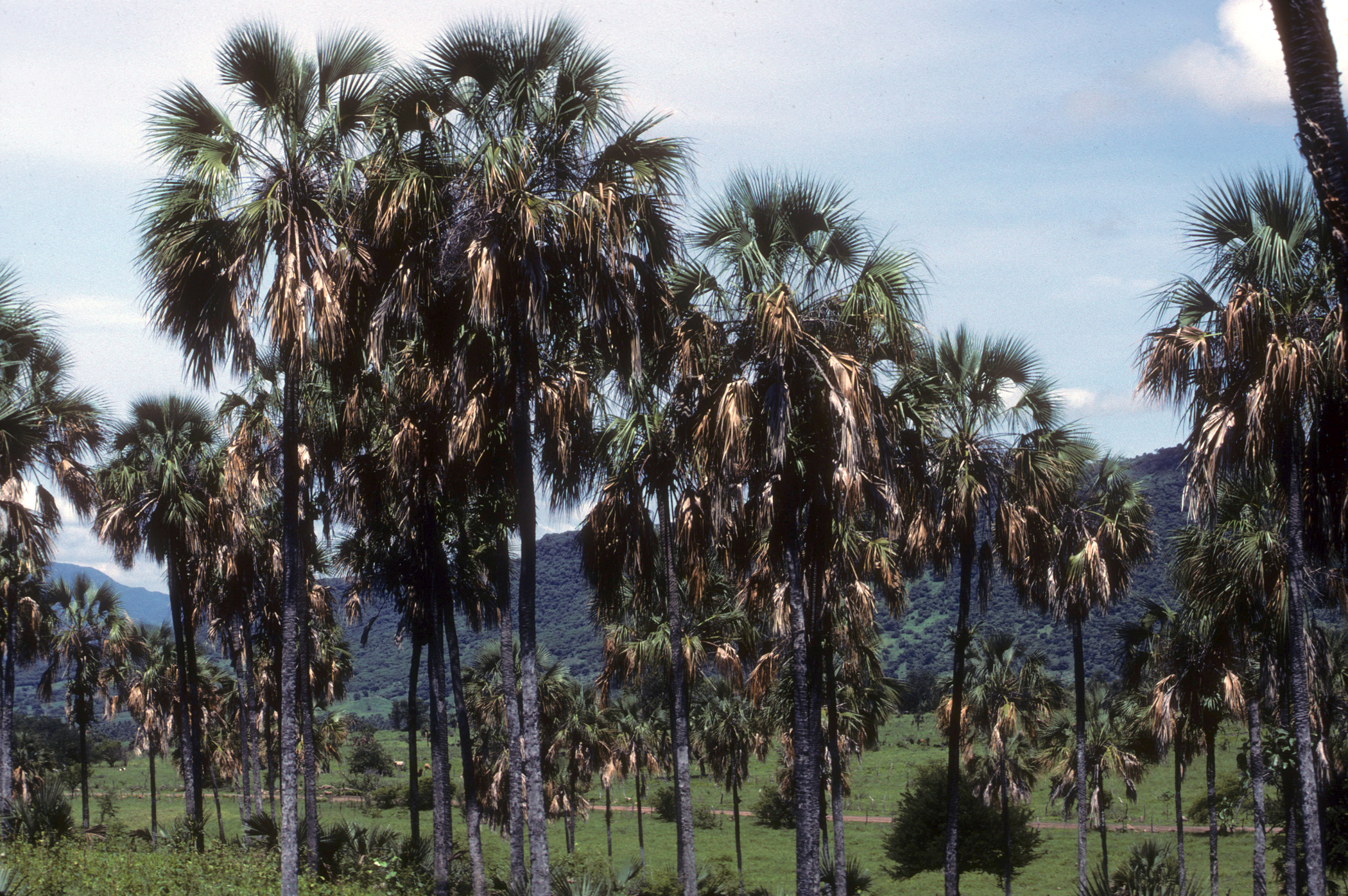

Conservation status
- Vulnerable (IUCN 2.3)

Scientific classification
- Kingdom: Plantae
- Clade: Tracheophytes
- Clade: Angiosperms
- Clade: Monocots
- Clade: Commelinids
- Order: Arecales
- Family: Arecaceae
- Genus: Sabal
- Species: S. pumos

Binomial name
- Sabal pumos (Kunth) Burret

= Sabal pumos =

Species of palm

Sabal pumos, known as the royal palmetto, is a species of flowering plant in the palm tree family, Arecaceae.

== Distribution ==
The palm tree is endemic to the Balsas dry forests habitats along the Balsas River in central Mexico. It is occasionally grown as an ornamental.

Mexican states it is native to include:

- Guanajuato
- Guerrero
- Jalisco
- State of México
- Michoacán
- Morelos
- Zacatecas

== Conservation ==
Sabal pumos is threatened by habitat loss. It is on the IUCN Vulnerable species list.

== See also ==
- Sabal palms and palmettos
