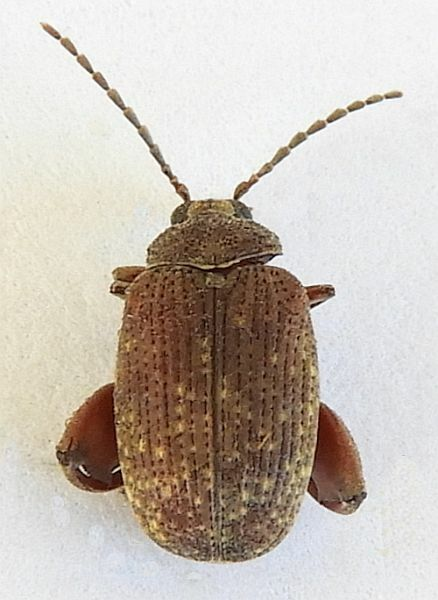
- Caryobruchus gleditsiae, Florida

Scientific classification
- Kingdom: Animalia
- Phylum: Arthropoda
- Class: Insecta
- Order: Coleoptera
- Suborder: Polyphaga
- Infraorder: Cucujiformia
- Family: Chrysomelidae
- Subfamily: Bruchinae
- Tribe: Pachymerini
- Subtribe: Pachymerina
- Genus: Caryobruchus; Bridwell, 1929

= Caryobruchus =

Genus of beetles

Caryobruchus is a genus of "pea and bean weevils" in the beetle family Chrysomelidae. There are at about six described species in Caryobruchus, including the extinct species Caryobruchus dominicanus from Dominican Republic amber.

== Species ==
These six species belong to the genus Caryobruchus:

- Caryobruchus curvipes (Latreille, 1811)
- Caryobruchus gleditsiae (Johansson & Linnaeus, 1763)
- Caryobruchus maya
- Caryobruchus rubidus (Chevrolat, 1877)
- Caryobruchus veseyi (Horn, 1873)
- †Caryobruchus dominicanus Poinar, 1999
