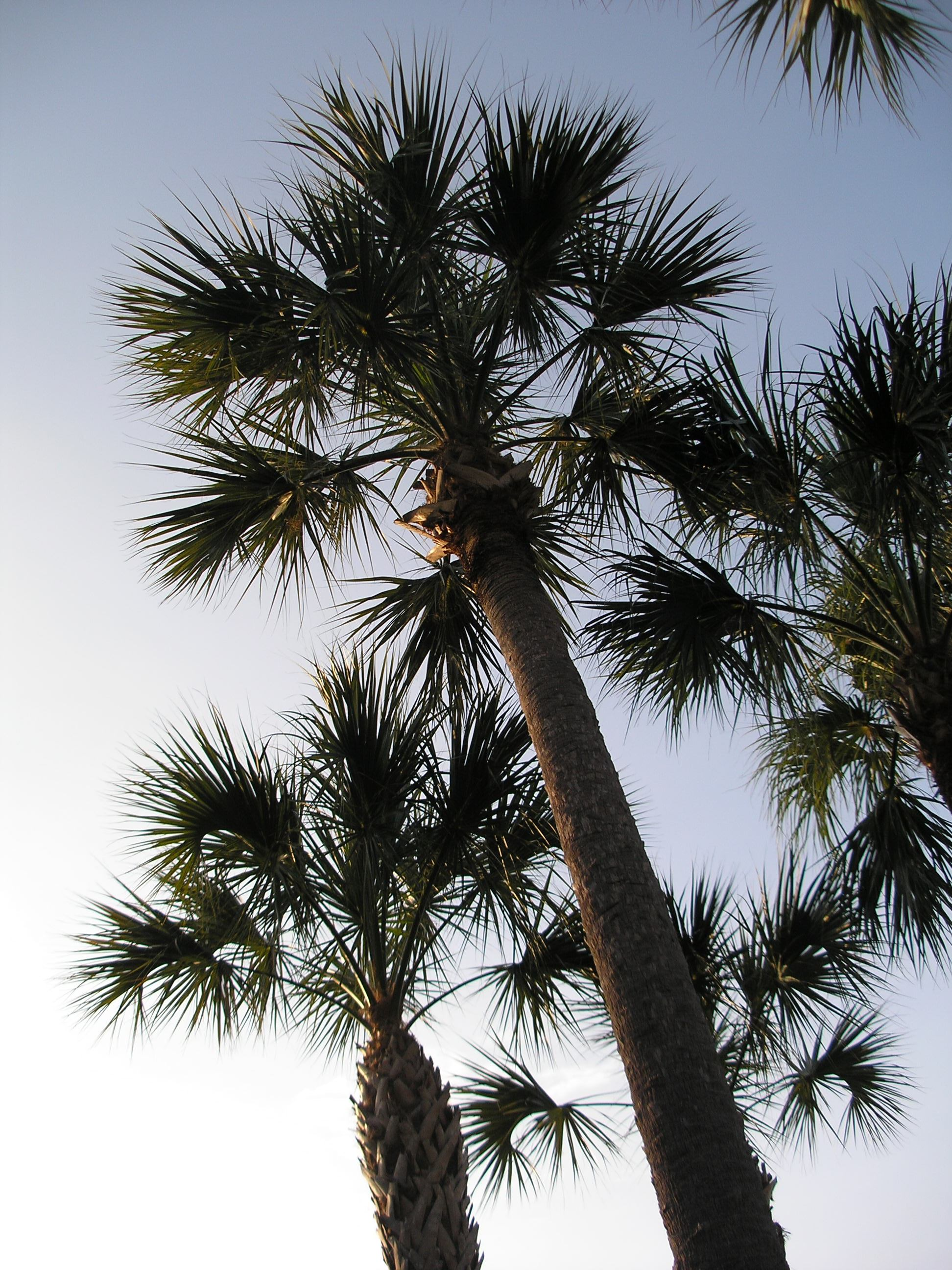
- Sabal palmetto

Scientific classification
- Kingdom: Plantae
- Clade: Embryophytes
- Clade: Tracheophytes
- Clade: Angiosperms
- Clade: Monocots
- Clade: Commelinids
- Order: Arecales
- Family: Arecaceae
- Subfamily: Coryphoideae
- Tribe: Sabaleae
- Genus: Sabal; Adans.

Type species
- Sabal adansonii Guers.

Synonyms
- Inodes O.F.Cook

= Sabal =

Palmetto Temporal range: Late Cretaceous to Recent (Campanian-Holocene), 77–0 Ma

Genus of palms

Sabal is a genus of New World palms (or fan-palms). Currently, there are 17 recognized species of Sabal, including one hybrid species.

== Distribution ==
The species are native to the subtropical and tropical regions of the Americas, from the Gulf Coast/South Atlantic states in the Southeastern United States, south through the Caribbean, Mexico, and Central America to Colombia and Venezuela.

== Description ==
Members of this genus are typically identified by the leaves which originate from a bare, unarmed petiole in a fan-like structure. All members of this genus have a costa (or midrib) that extends into the leaf blade. This midrib can vary in length; and it is due to this variation that leaf blades of certain species of Sabal are strongly curved or strongly costapalmate (as in Sabal palmetto and Sabal etonia) or weakly curved (almost flattened), weakly costapalmate (as in Sabal minor). Like many other palms, the fruit of Sabal are drupe, that typically change from green to black when mature.

== Taxonomy ==
The name Sabal was first applied to members of the group by Michel Adanson in the 18th century. Previous names that this genus was associated with include Corypha, Chamaerops, Rhapis. This section highlights important phylogenetic work done within the genus Sabal.

In 1990, Scott Zona outlined key morphological and anatomical characters that he used to analyze species relationships of Sabal. Through this analysis of characters, Zona produced a cladogram that portrays evolutionary relationships amongst 15 species of Sabal. Based on the distribution of species within his cladogram, Zona recognized four distinct clades. The clades within his study include:

- Clade 1

Sabal minor

- Clade 2

Sabal bermudana, Sabal palmetto, Sabal miamiensis, and Sabal etonia

- Clade 3

Sabal maritima, Sabal domingensis, Sabal causiarum, Sabal maurittiformis, Sabal yapa, Sabal mexicana, and Sabal guatemalensis

- Clade 4

Sabal uresana, Sabal rosei, and Sabal pumos.

These clades associate closely with geographic distributions. Most of the species within Clade 3 occur in the Greater Antilles and southern Mexico, where species that occur in the Greater Antilles are more closely related to each other than those that occur in southern Mexico. Although Clade 4 also occurs in Mexico, these species occur on the west coast where they are geographically separated from the Mexican species within the southern part of the country. The remaining two clades, Clade 1 and Clade 2 predominantly occur in the southeastern United States although S. palmetto and S. minor are also known from Cuba and the Bahamas (S. palmetto) and northern Mexico (S. minor). Sabal bermudana is only known from Bermuda.

In 2016 Heyduk, Trapnell, Barrett, and Leebens-Mack conducted a new study on Sabal that analyzed molecular (e.g. nuclear, plastid) data from 15 species of the group. This study incorporated plastid and nuclear sequence data that together were used to estimate the relatedness between the species of Sabal. The results of the study show species relationships to be different from the distribution of Zona's cladogram. Within the framework of this study, a major difference between the results of Zona and this study is the placement of "Clade 4" (Sabal uresana, Sabal rosei, and Sabal pumos) which split and integrate these species throughout the phylogeny of Sabal. The largest of the clades identified by Zona, "Clade 3" is disrupted significantly as it is split into multiple clades. Although Sabal causiarum and S. domingensis retain their relationship as sister species, they are included in a clade that also includes S. maritima and S. rosei. Despite these disruptions in placement between these two studies, the overall integrity of "Clade 1" and "Clade 2" is in congruence with the clades established from the molecular data.

=== Species ===
Image	Scientific name	Common name	Distribution
	Sabal antillensis M.P.Griff.	Antillean palmetto	Curaçao (Note: Some sources and online databases have listed Bonaire as a location of Sabal antilles, in addition to Curaçao; howevever, a 2024 publication concluded that genomic patterning confirmed single-island (Curaçao) endemism.)
	Sabal bermudana L.H.Bailey	Bermuda palmetto	Bermuda
	Sabal brazoriensis D.H.Goldman, Lockett & Read	Brazoria palmetto	United States (Texas)
	Sabal causiarum (O.F. Cook) Becc.	Puerto Rico palmetto	United States (Puerto Rico), British Virgin Islands, Hispaniola (Haiti and the Dominican Republic)
	Sabal domingensis Becc.	Hispaniola palmetto	Cuba, Hispaniola (Dominican Republic, Haiti)
	Sabal etonia Swingle ex Nash	Scrub palmetto	United States (Florida)
	Sabal gretheriae H.J.Quero.R.	Yucatán palmetto	Mexico (Quintana Roo)
	Sabal lougheediana M.P.Griff.	Bonaire palmetto	Bonaire
	Sabal maritima (Kunth) Burret	Jamaica palmetto	Jamaica, Cuba
	Sabal mauritiiformis (H.Karst.) Griseb. & H.Wendl.	Savannah palm or palma de vaca	Southern Mexico to northern Colombia, Venezuela, Trinidad and Tobago (Trinida))
	Sabal mexicana Mart.	Mexican palmetto	United States (southern Texas) south through Mexico to Nicaragua
	Sabal miamiensis	Miami palmetto	United States (Southern Florida)
	Sabal minor (Jacq.) Pers.	Dwarf palmetto	Northeastern Mexico, Southeastern United States (Florida north to North Carolina, west to Texas)
	Sabal palmetto (Walter) Lodd. ex Schult. & Schult.f.	Cabbage palmetto	Cuba, Bahamas, Turks and Caicos Islands, United States (Florida north to North Carolina)
	Sabal pumos (Kunth) Burret	Royal palmetto	Mexico (Guerrero, Michoacán, Puebla)
	Sabal rosei (O.F.Cook) Becc.	Rosei palmetto	Northwestern Mexico
	Sabal uresana Trel.	Sonoran palmetto	Mexico (Chihuahua, Sonora)
	Sabal yapa C.Wright ex Becc.		Mexico (Yucatán Peninsula), Belize, Cuba, Guatemala

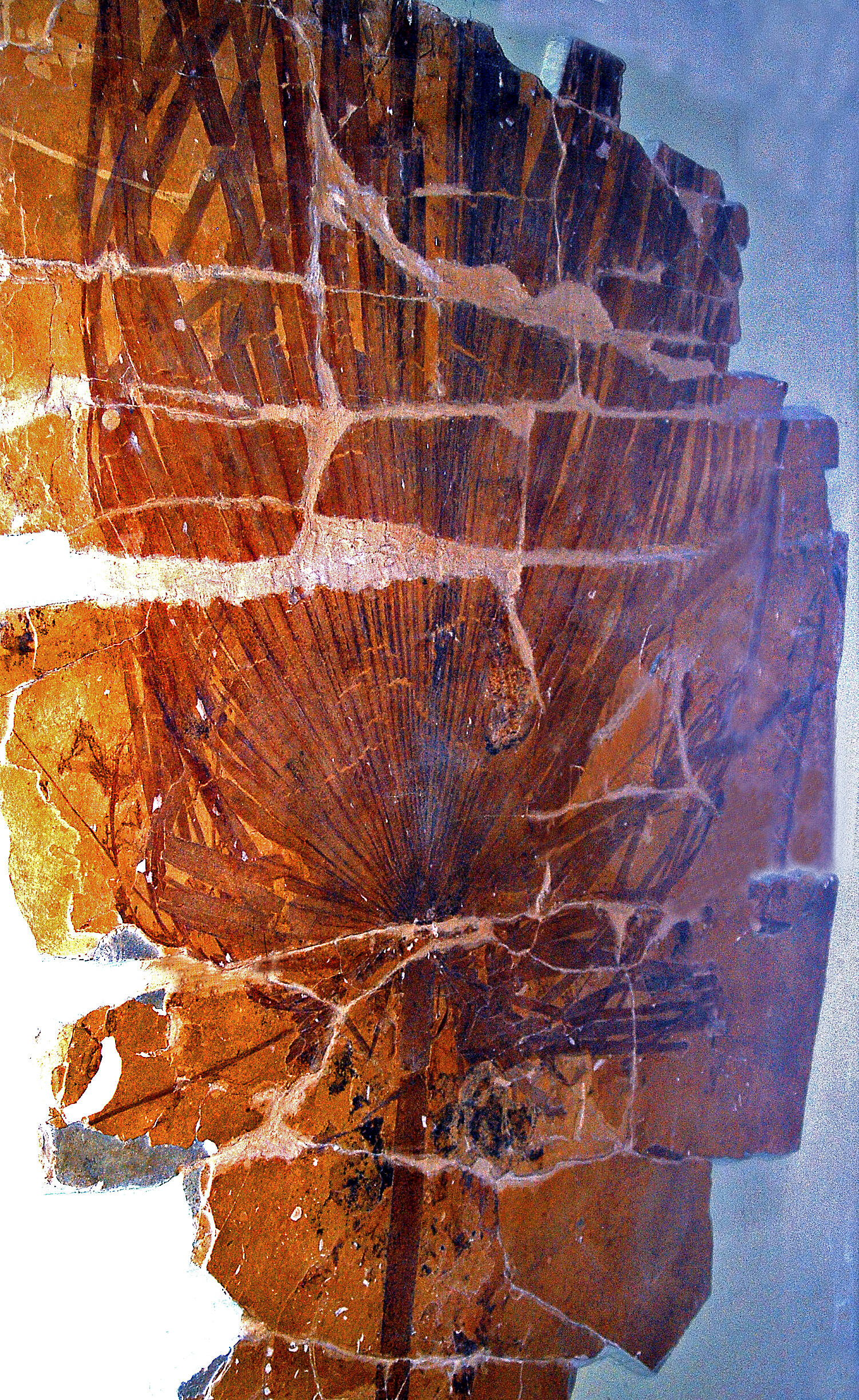
Fossil of S. major

=== Prehistoric taxa ===
Extinct species within this genus include:

- †Sabal bigbendense Manchester et al. 2010
- †Sabal bracknellense (Chandler) Mai
- †Sabal grayana Brown 1962
- †Sabal imperialis Brown 1962
- †Sabal jenkinsii (Reid & Chandler) Manchester 1994
- †Sabal lamanonis
- †Sabal raphipholia

Plants of the genus lived from the late Cretaceous to the Quaternary period (from 66 million to 12 thousand years ago). Fossils have been found in the United States, as well as in Europe (Italy, Switzerland, Germany, Greece, Slovakia, the United Kingdom, France) and Japan. Leaf fossils of Sabal lamanonis have been recovered from rhyodacite tuff of Lower Miocene age in southern Slovakia near the town of Lučenec. 27 million year old Sabal lamanonis and Sabal raphipholia leaf fossils in volcanic rocks have been described from the Evros region in Western Thrace, Greece.

=== Formerly placed in Sabal ===
- Serenoa repens (W.Bartram) Small (as S. serrulata (Michx.) Nutt. ex Schult. & Schult.f.)

== Ecology ==
Sabal species are used as food sources by several species of birds (including Mimus polyglottos, Turdus migratorius, Dendroica coronata, Corvus ossifragus, and Drycopus pileatus) as well as insects, such as Caryobruchus and various species of Hymenoptera. American black bears (Ursus americanus) and raccoons (Procyon lotor) are also known to feed on fruit of various species of Sabal. Sabal palmetto is recorded to have its own lichen, Arthonia rubrocincta, that only occurs on its leaf bases. In Europe, the introduced Lepidopteran species Paysandisia archon has become a prominent pest whose larvae are known to feed on some of the cultivated species of Sabal.

== Uses ==
Arborescent species are often transplanted from natural stands into urban landscapes and are rarely grown in nurseries due to slow growth. Several species are cultivated as ornamental plants and because several species are relatively cold-hardy, can be grown farther north than most other palms. The central bud of Sabal palmetto is edible and, when cooked, is known as 'swamp cabbage'. Mature fronds are used as thatch, to make straw hats, and for weaving mats.
