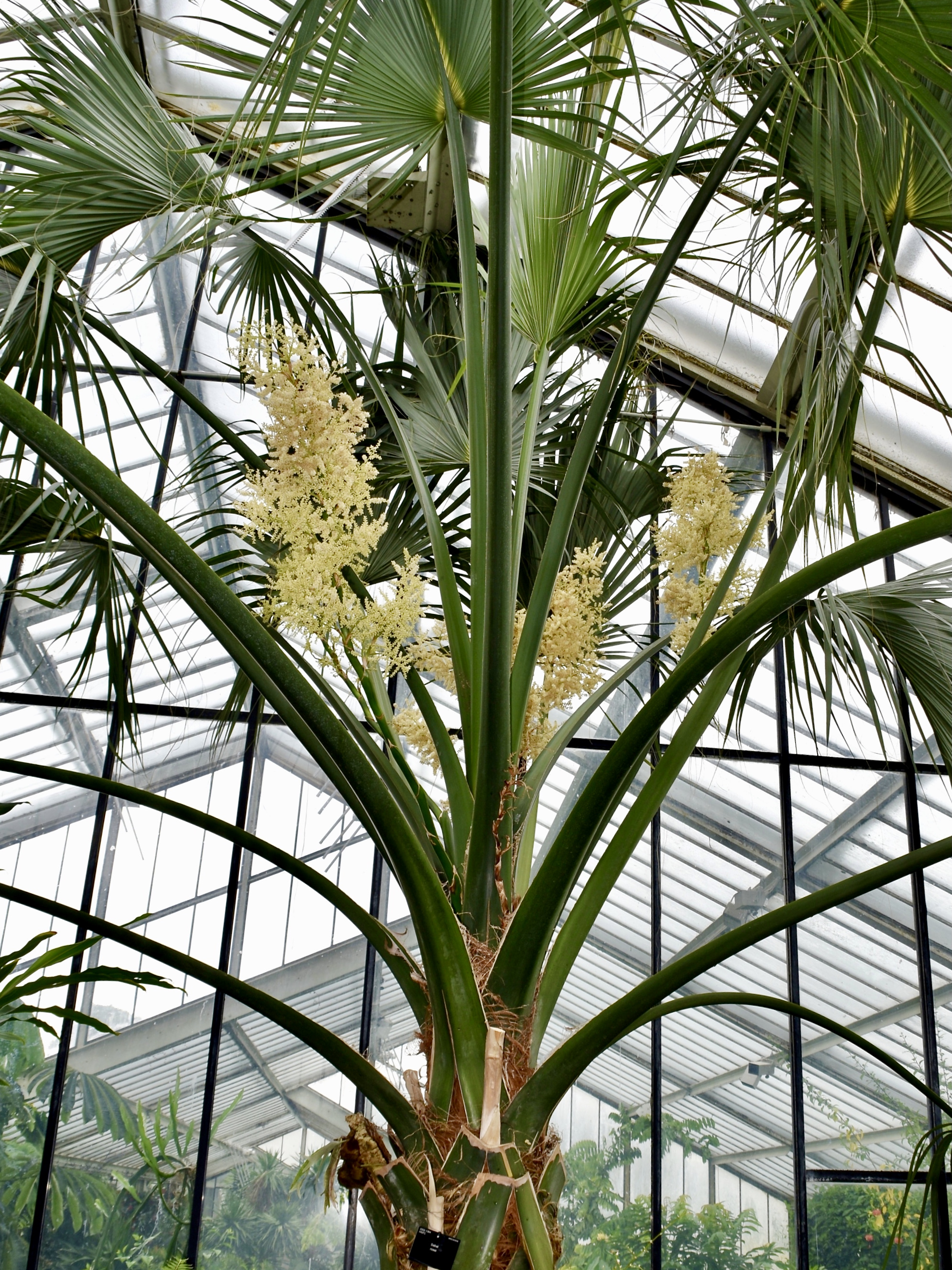
- At Kew Gardens

Scientific classification
- Kingdom: Plantae
- Clade: Tracheophytes
- Clade: Angiosperms
- Clade: Monocots
- Clade: Commelinids
- Order: Arecales
- Family: Arecaceae
- Genus: Sabal
- Species: S. rosei

Binomial name
- Sabal rosei (O.F.Cook) Becc.

Synonyms
- Inodes rosei O.F.Cook; Sabal uresana var. roseana I.M.Johnst.

= Sabal rosei =

Species of plant in the genus Sabal

Sabal rosei, the Llanos palmetto or Savannah palmetto, is a species of flowering plant in the palm family Arecaceae, native to the Pacific coast of Mexico, from Sinaloa to Jalisco. Hardy to USDA zone 8a, it tolerates both flooding and drought, although it is typically found in dry areas.
