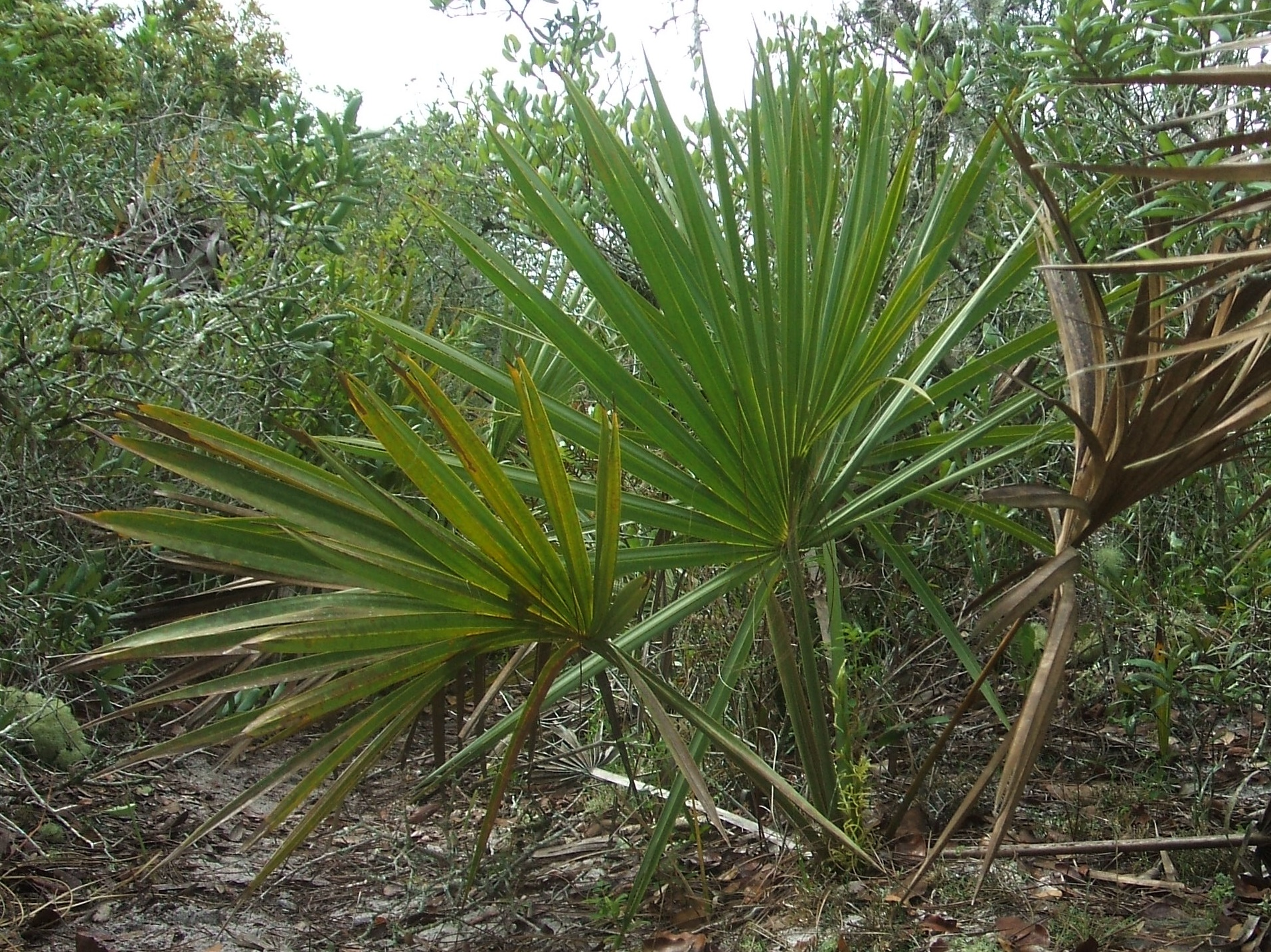
- Sabal etonia at Archbold Biological Station, Florida, United States

Conservation status
- Apparently Secure (NatureServe)

Scientific classification
- Kingdom: Plantae
- Clade: Tracheophytes
- Clade: Angiosperms
- Clade: Monocots
- Clade: Commelinids
- Order: Arecales
- Family: Arecaceae
- Genus: Sabal
- Species: S. etonia

Binomial name
- Sabal etonia Swingle ex Nash

Synonyms
- Sabal adansonii var. megacarpa Chapm.; Sabal megacarpa (Chapm.) Small; Sabal miamiensis Zona

= Sabal etonia =

Species of palm

Sabal etonia, commonly known as the scrub palmetto is a species of palm. It is endemic to Florida in the United States, where it is found in Florida sand pine scrub communities.

== Description ==
Sabal etonia is a fan palm with a solitary stem that is usually subterranean, but is sometimes above ground and can usually grow 0.9 m (3.0 ft) to 1.2 m (3.9 ft) tall. Plants usually have four to seven costapalmate leaves, each with 25–50 leaflets. The inflorescences, which are branched with a bushy appearance, are shorter than the leaves and bear brownish-black fruit. The fruit are 0.9–1.5 cm (0.4–0.6 in) and 0.8–1.3 cm (0.3–0.5 in) in diameter.

== Taxonomy ==
Sabal is placed in the subfamily Coryphoideae and the tribe Sabaleae.

The species was first described by American botanist Walter Tennyson Swingle in 1896, based on collections made near Eustis, Florida, in 1894. Sabal miamiensis is treated as either a synonym or a separate species by different authors.

== Gallery ==
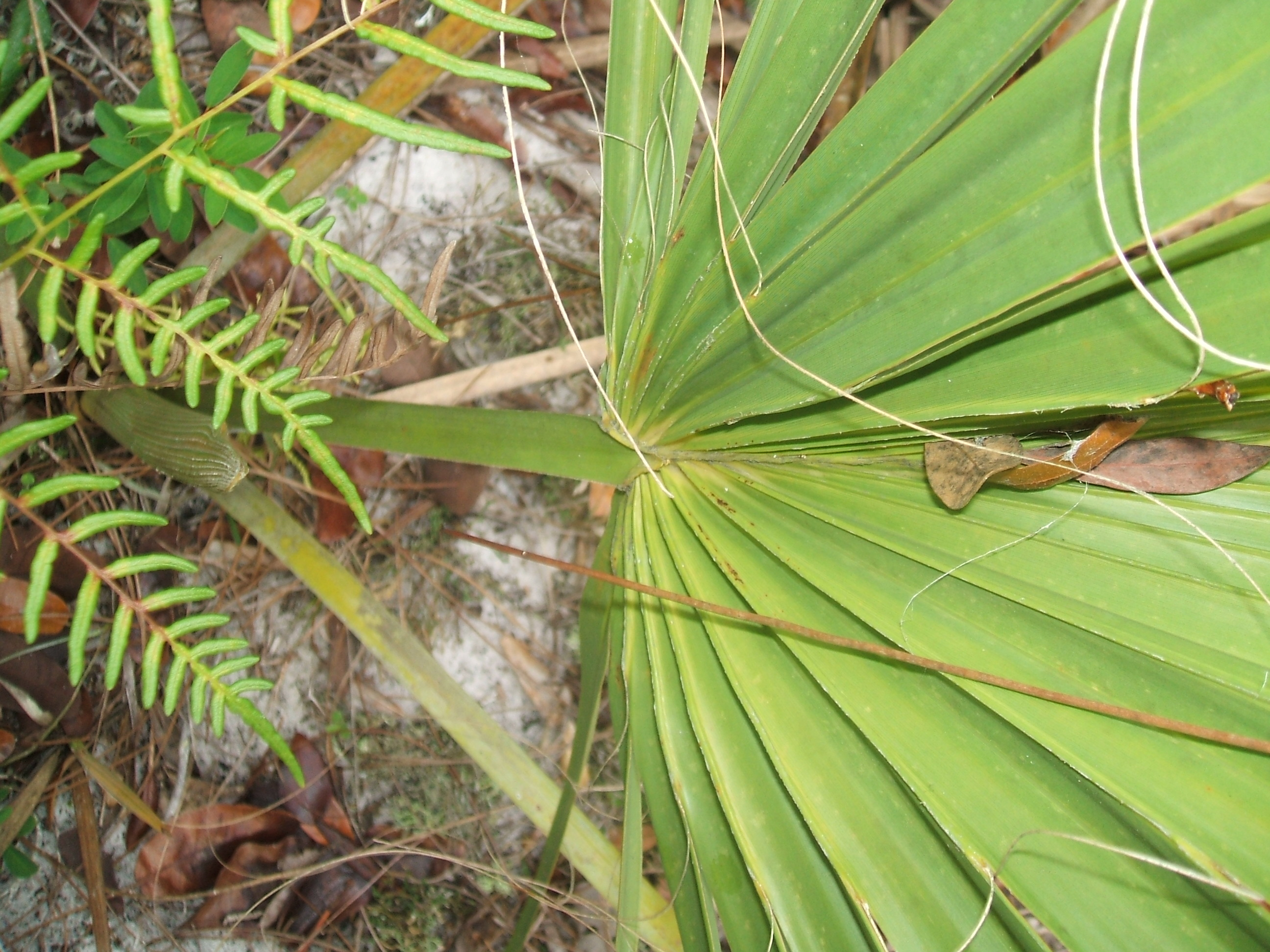
Detail of the leaf of S. etonia
