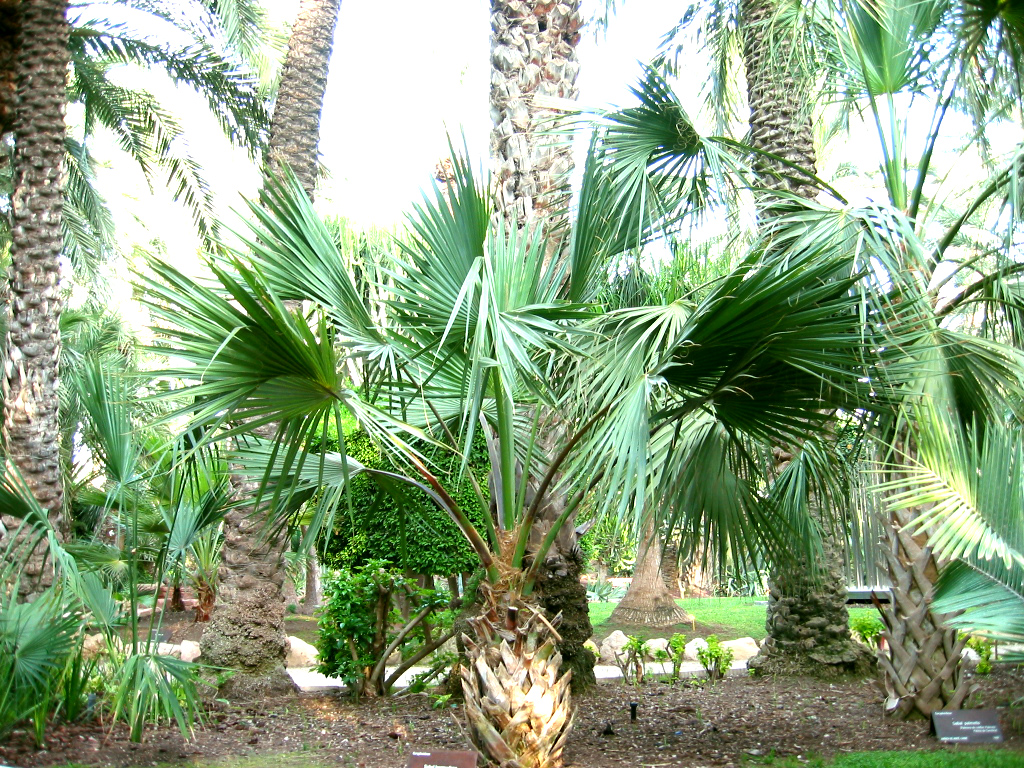
- Individual in a Spanish botanical garden

Conservation status
- Endangered (IUCN 3.1)

Scientific classification
- Kingdom: Plantae
- Clade: Tracheophytes
- Clade: Angiosperms
- Clade: Monocots
- Clade: Commelinids
- Order: Arecales
- Family: Arecaceae
- Genus: Sabal
- Species: S. bermudana

Binomial name
- Sabal bermudana L.H.Bailey

Synonyms
- Inodes princeps (Becc.) Cif. & Giacom.; Sabal beccariana L.H.Bailey; Sabal princeps Becc.

= Sabal bermudana =

Species of palm

Sabal bermudana, commonly known as the Bermuda palmetto or bibby-tree, is one of 15 species of palm trees in the genus Sabal and is endemic to Bermuda although reportedly naturalized in the Leeward Islands. It was greatly affected by the introduction of non-native plants such as the Chinese fan palm, which created competition for space that it usually lost.

== Description ==
Sabal bermudana grows up to 25 m (82 ft) in height, with the occasional old tree growing up to 30 m (100 ft) in height, with a trunk up to 55 cm (22 in) in diameter. It is a fan palm (Arecaceae tribe Corypheae), with the leaves with a bare petiole terminating in a rounded fan of numerous leaflets. Each leaf is 1.5–2 m (4.9–6.6 ft) long, with 45-60 leaflets up to 75 cm (30 in) long. The flowers are yellowish-white, 5 mm (0.20 in) across, produced in large panicles up to 2.5 m (8.2 ft) long, extending out beyond the leaves. The fruit is a deep brown to black drupe about 1 cm (0.4 in) long containing a single seed. It is extremely salt-tolerant and is often seen growing near the Atlantic Ocean coast in Bermuda, and also frost-tolerant, surviving short periods of temperatures as low as -14 °C, although no such temperatures have ever occurred in Bermuda.

== Uses ==
Bermudians used to use, for a short period, the leaflets of the palm to weave into hats and export them to the United Kingdom and other countries. Sabal bermudana also had holes drilled into its trunk and sap extracted to make "bibby", a strong alcoholic beverage.

During the 17th century, most houses in Bermuda had palmetto-thatched roofs.
