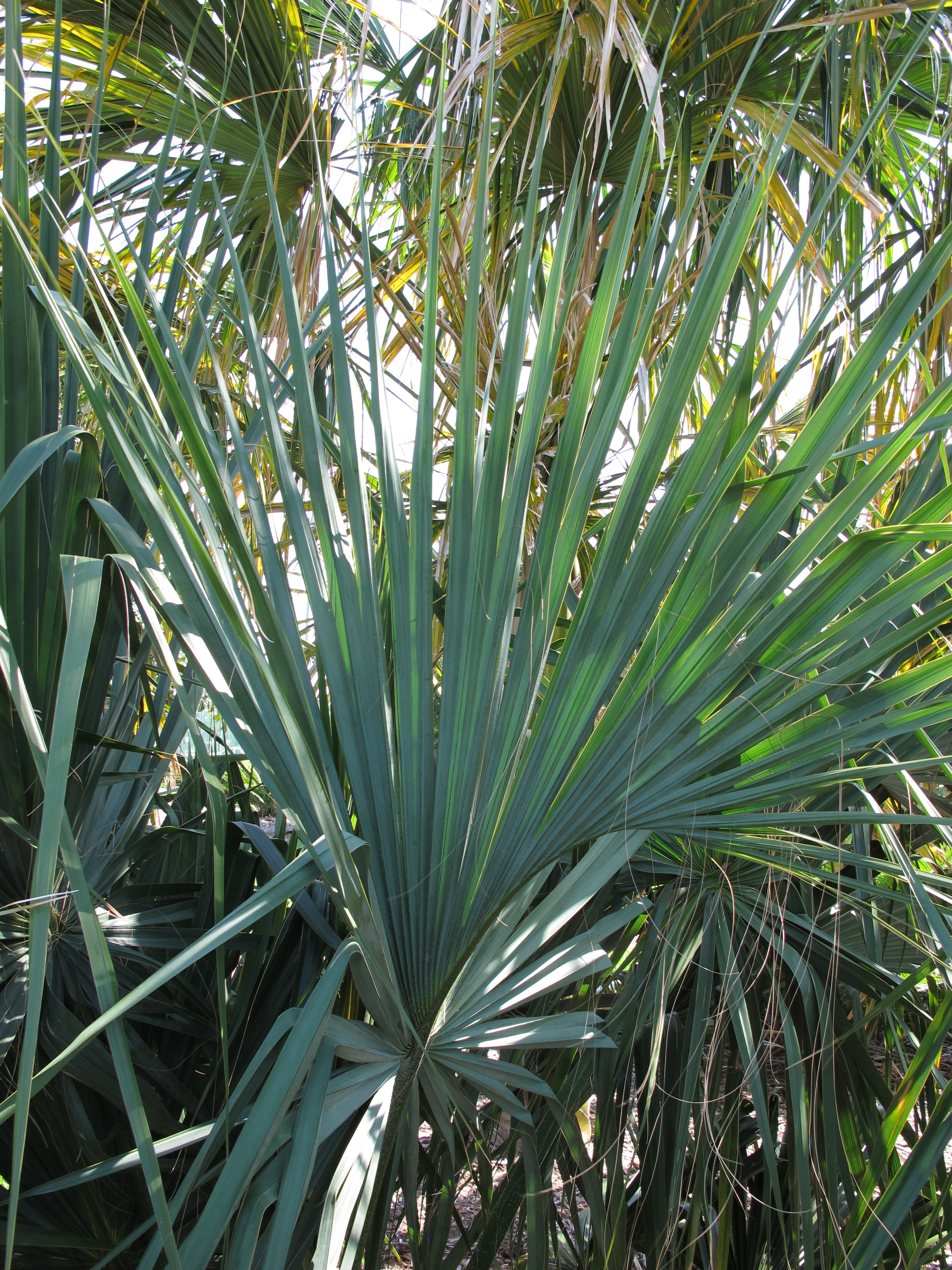

Conservation status
- Least Concern (IUCN 3.1)

Scientific classification
- Kingdom: Plantae
- Clade: Tracheophytes
- Clade: Angiosperms
- Clade: Monocots
- Clade: Commelinids
- Order: Arecales
- Family: Arecaceae
- Genus: Sabal
- Species: S. mauritiiformis

Binomial name
- Sabal mauritiiformis (H.Karst.) Griseb. & H.Wendl.

Synonyms
- Trithrinax mauritiiformis H.Karst.; Sabal allenii L.H.Bailey; Sabal coerulescens T.Moore & Mast.; Sabal glaucescens Lodd. ex H.Wendl.; Sabal glaucescens Lodd. ex Drabble; Sabal morrisiana Bartlett ex L.H.Bailey; Sabal nematoclada Burret

= Sabal mauritiiformis =

Species of palm

Sabal mauritiiformis, commonly known as the Savannah palm, is a species of flowering plant in the family Arecaceae. It grows in Mexico (Oaxaca, Chiapas, Campeche, Quintana Roo, Tabasco, Veracruz), Central America, Colombia, Venezuela and Trinidad.

== Description ==
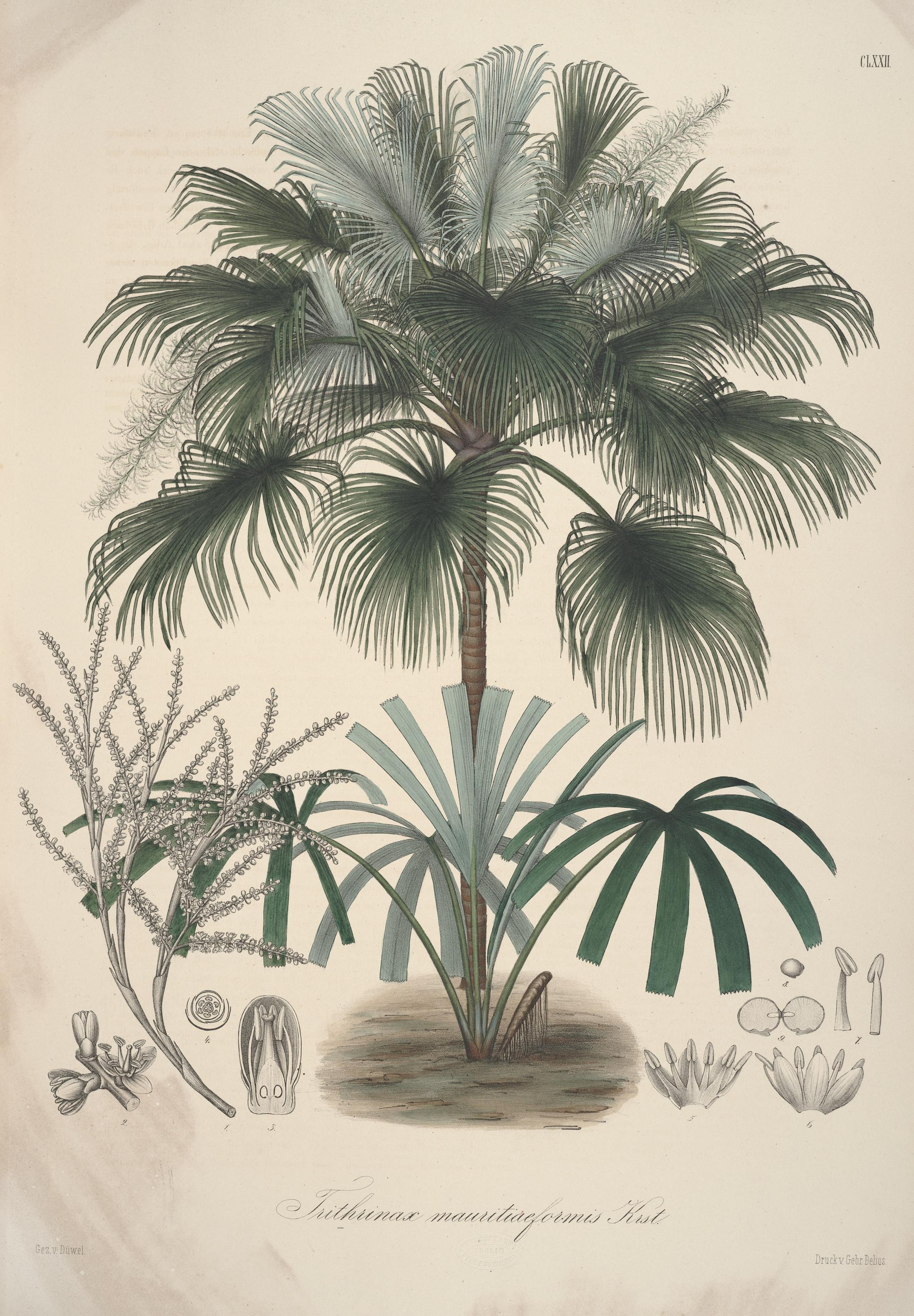
PlateCLXXII Florae Columbiae

Sabal mauritiiformis is a fan palm with solitary, slender stems, which is usually 15 to 20 metres (49 to 66 ft) tall and 15–20 centimetres (6–8 in) in diameter. Plants have about 10–25 leaves, each with 90–150 leaflets. The inflorescences, which are branched and longer than the leaves, bear pear-shaped to globose, black fruit. The fruit are 0.8–1.1 centimetres (0.3–0.4 in) in diameter.
