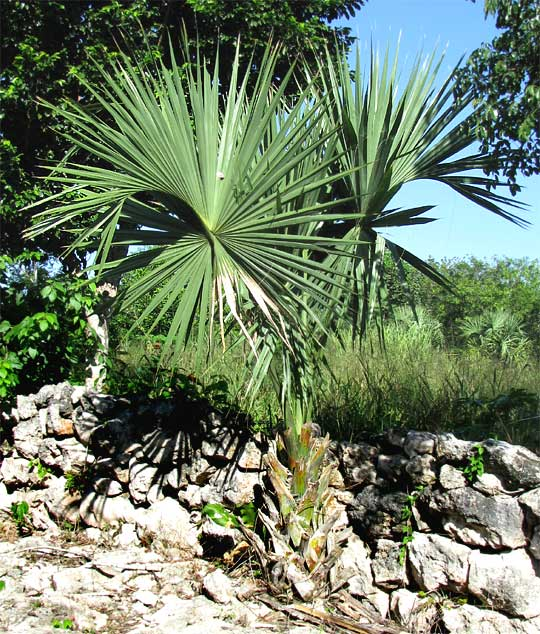
- in the Yucatán

Scientific classification
- Kingdom: Plantae
- Clade: Tracheophytes
- Clade: Angiosperms
- Clade: Monocots
- Clade: Commelinids
- Order: Arecales
- Family: Arecaceae
- Genus: Sabal
- Species: S. yapa

Binomial name
- Sabal yapa C.Wright ex Becc.

= Sabal yapa =

Species of palm

Sabal yapa is a species of palm that grows in Belize, Guatemala, western Cuba, and the Yucatan Peninsula region of Mexico (Yucatán, Campeche, Quintana Roo). It prefers limestone-based calcareous soils. It is often described as a palmetto palm as it has costapalmate fronds, which are a transition phase between fan palms and feather-leaved palms.

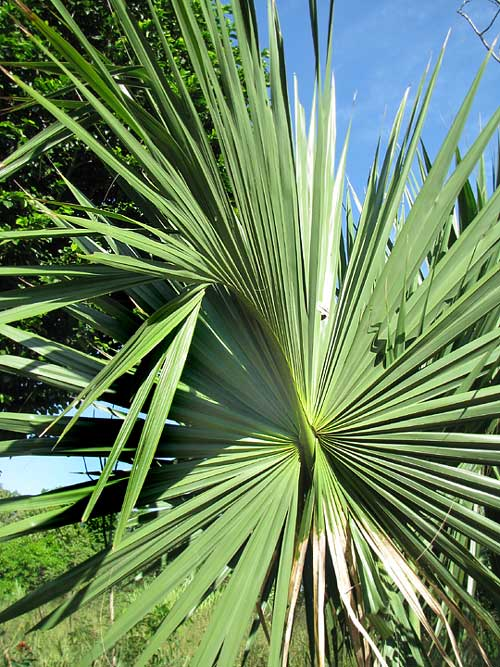
Close-up of a frond
