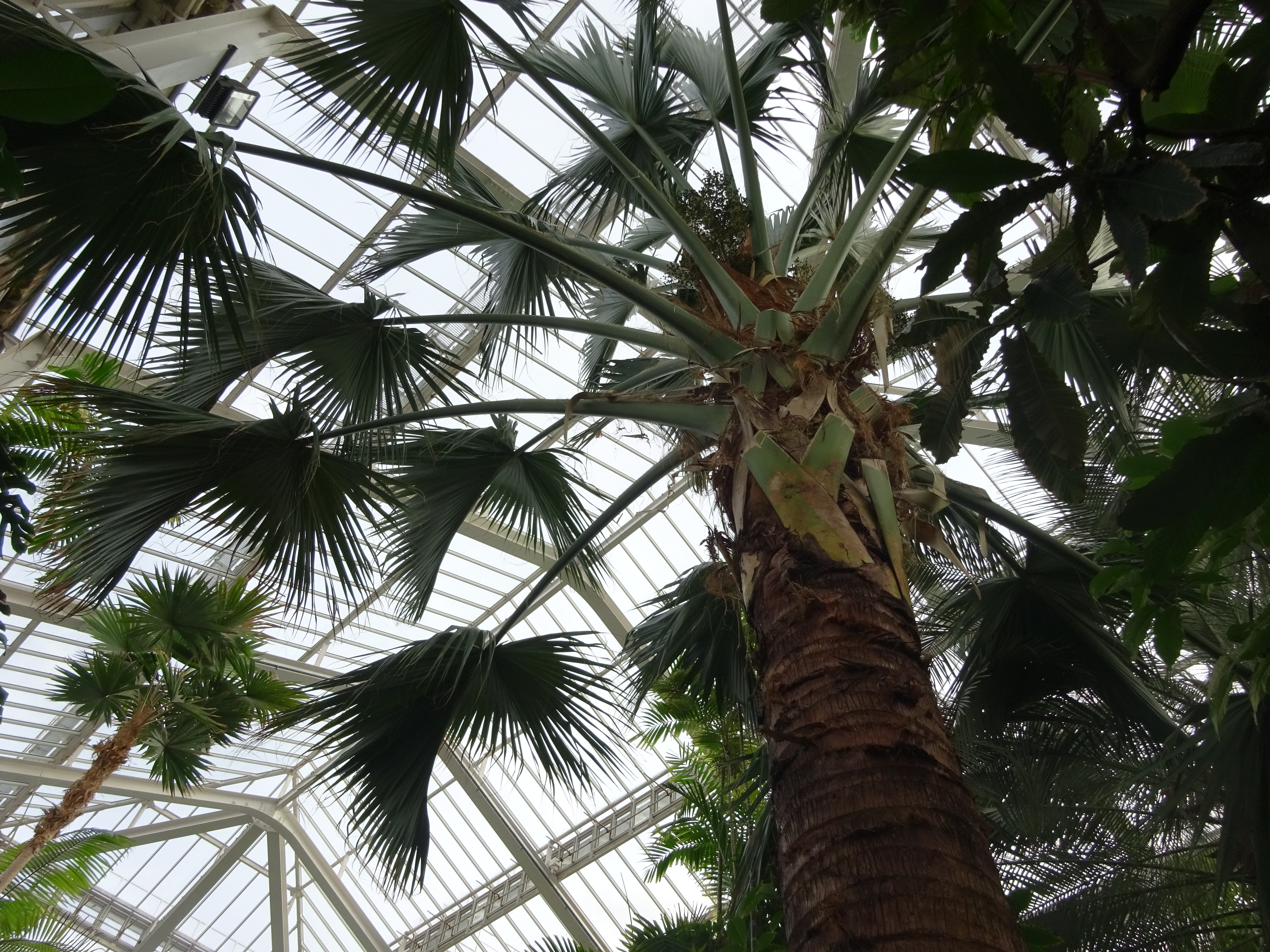
- At Botanic Garden Meise

Conservation status
- Least Concern (IUCN 3.1)

Scientific classification
- Kingdom: Plantae
- Clade: Tracheophytes
- Clade: Angiosperms
- Clade: Monocots
- Clade: Commelinids
- Order: Arecales
- Family: Arecaceae
- Genus: Sabal
- Species: S. domingensis

Binomial name
- Sabal domingensis Becc.

Synonyms
- Sabal neglecta Becc.

= Sabal domingensis =

Species of plant

Sabal domingensis, the Hispaniola palmetto, is a species of palm which is native to Hispaniola (in both the Dominican Republic and Haiti) and Cuba.

== Description ==
Sabal domingensis is a fan palm with solitary, very stout stems, which grows up to 10 metres (33 ft) tall and 60 centimetres (24 in) in diameter. Plants have 20–30 leaves, each with about 90 leaflets. The inflorescences, which are branched, arching and at least as long as the leaves, bear pear-shaped, black fruit. The fruit are 1–1.4 centimetres (0.4–0.6 in) in diameter; fruit size and shape are the main characteristics by which this species differs from Sabal causiarum.

=== Common names ===
In English, Sabal domingensis is known as the "Hispaniola palmetto", "Hispaniola palm", or "Dominican palm". In Spanish, it is known (along with Sabal causiarum) as palma cana in the Dominican Republic, and in Haitian Creole as latanier-chapeau.

== Distribution ==
Sabal domingensis is found from northwest Haiti to the central Dominican Republic on Hispaniola, and is also present in Cuba. It is usually found in secondary vegetation between 100 and 1,000 metres (328 and 3,281 ft) above sea level.

== Uses ==
The leaves are used for thatch and to weave a variety of items including hats, baskets and mats.

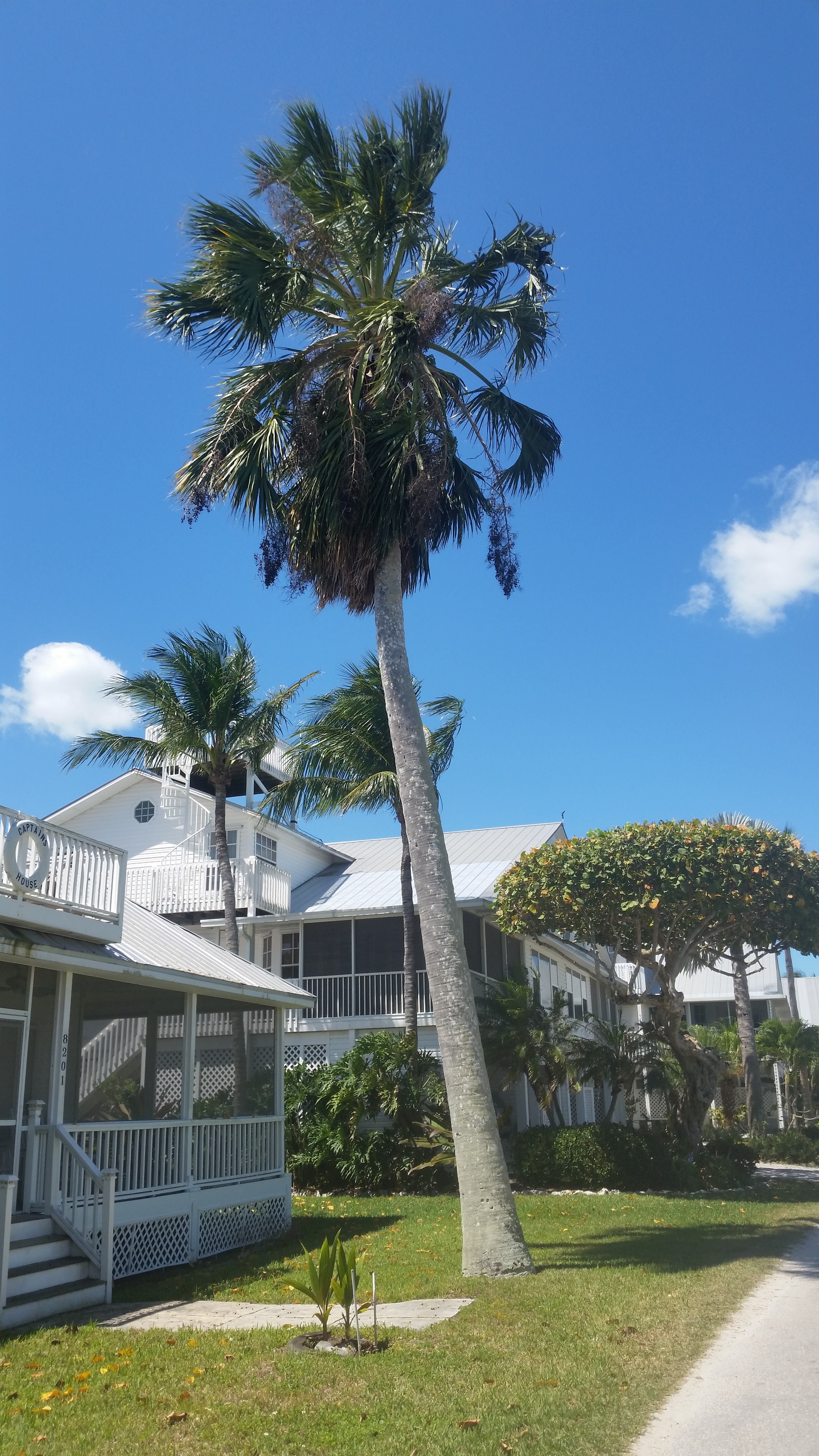
Sabal domingensis growing on Pine Island, Florida.

== Etymology ==
The species has been given the specific epithet domingensis, as it occurs on the island of Hispaniola; the island was historically called Santo Domingo, or Saint-Domingue.
