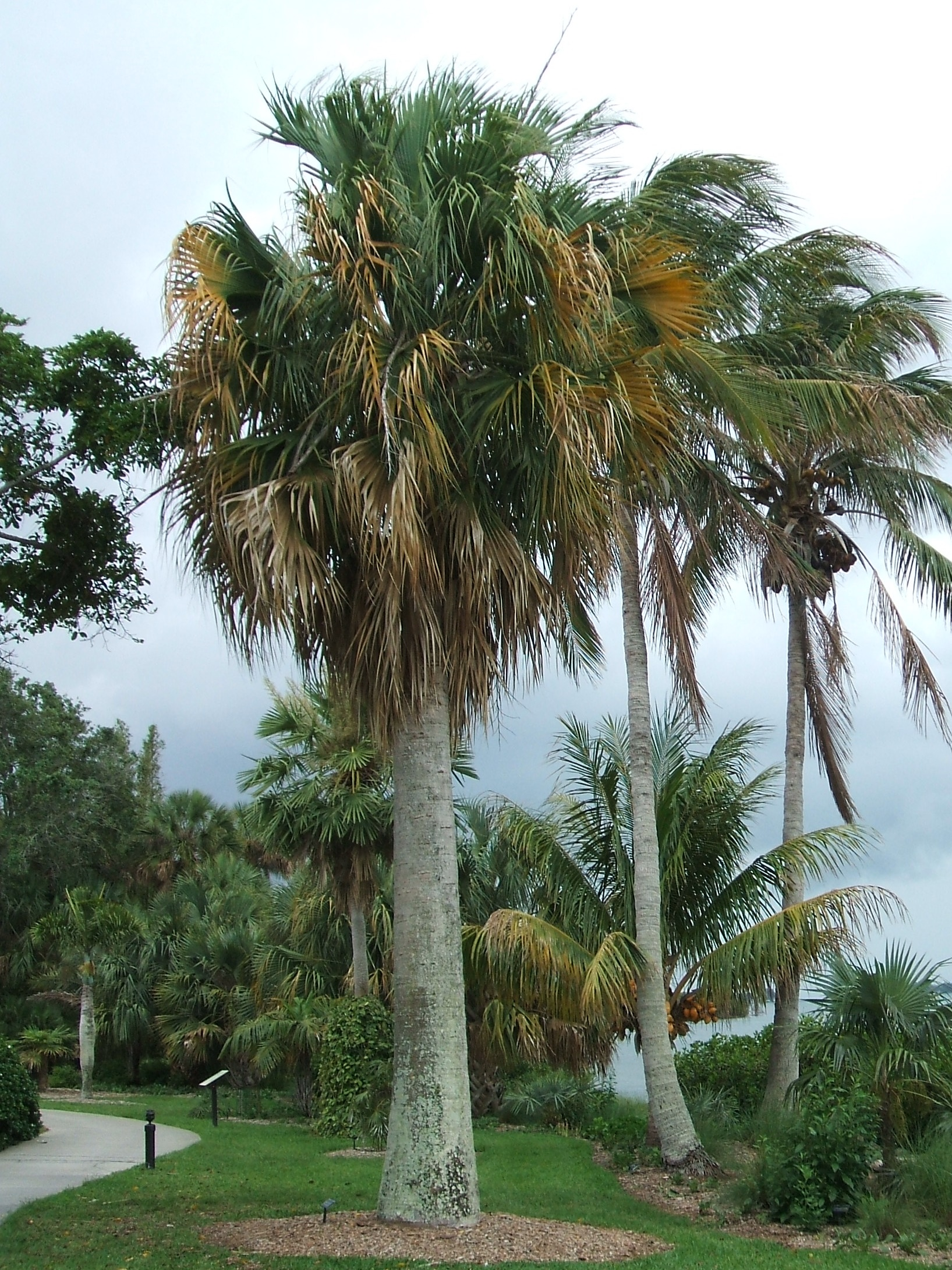
- At Marie Selby Botanical Gardens, Sarasota, Florida

Conservation status
- Vulnerable (IUCN 3.1)

Scientific classification
- Kingdom: Plantae
- Clade: Tracheophytes
- Clade: Angiosperms
- Clade: Monocots
- Clade: Commelinids
- Order: Arecales
- Family: Arecaceae
- Genus: Sabal
- Species: S. causiarum

Binomial name
- Sabal causiarum (O.F.Cook) Becc.

Synonyms
- Inodes causiarum O.F.Cook; Inodes glauca Dammer; Sabal haitensis Becc. ex Martelli; Sabal questeliana L.H.Bailey

= Sabal causiarum =

Species of plant

Sabal causiarum, commonly known as the Puerto Rico palmetto or Puerto Rican hat palm, is a species of palm which is native to Hispaniola (in both the Dominican Republic and Haiti), Puerto Rico, and the British Virgin Islands. As its common and scientific names suggest, its leaves are used in the manufacture of "straw" hats.

== Description ==
Sabal causiarum is a fan palm with solitary, very stout stems, which grows up to 10 metres (33 ft) tall and 35–70 centimetres (14–28 in) in diameter. Plants have 20–30 leaves, each with 60–120 leaflets. The inflorescences, which are branched, arching or pendulous, and longer than the leaves, bear globose, black fruit. The fruit are 0.7–1.1 centimetres (0.3–0.4 in) in diameter; fruit size and shape are the main characteristics by which this species differs from Sabal domingensis.

== Taxonomy ==
Sabal is placed in the subfamily Coryphoideae and the tribe Sabaleae. As of 2008, there appear to be no molecular phylogenetic studies of Sabal and the relationship between S. causiarum and the rest of the genus is uncertain.

The species was first described by American botanist Orator F. Cook as Inodes causiarum in 1901. The specific epithet, causiarum means "of hats"; the Latin word referred to "a wide-brimmed Macedonian hat". Cook erected the genus Inodes to incorporate members of the genus Sabal with upright trunks and leaves with well-developed midribs. Italian naturalist Odoardo Beccari transferred the species to Sabal and coined the current binomial, S. causiarum.

In 1903, German botanist Carl Lebrecht Udo Dammer described Inodes glauca, based on collections made near Peñuelas in Puerto Rico by Paul Sintenis. In 1931 Odoardo Beccari described Sabal haitensis based on collections made in Haiti. American botanist Liberty Hyde Bailey described Sabal questeliana in 1944, based on collections from Saint Barthélemy. All of these species are considered to be synonyms of S. causiarum.

Andrew Henderson and colleagues noted that Sabal causiarum, S. domingensis and S. maritima form a species complex that may constitute a single species.

=== Common names ===
Sabal causiarum is known as the hat palm or Puerto Rican hat palm or "Puerto Rico palmetto" in English. In Spanish, along with Sabal domingensis, it is known as palma cana in the Dominican Republic, and palma de sombrero, yarey, palma de escoba, palma de abanico, or palma de cogollo in Puerto Rico.

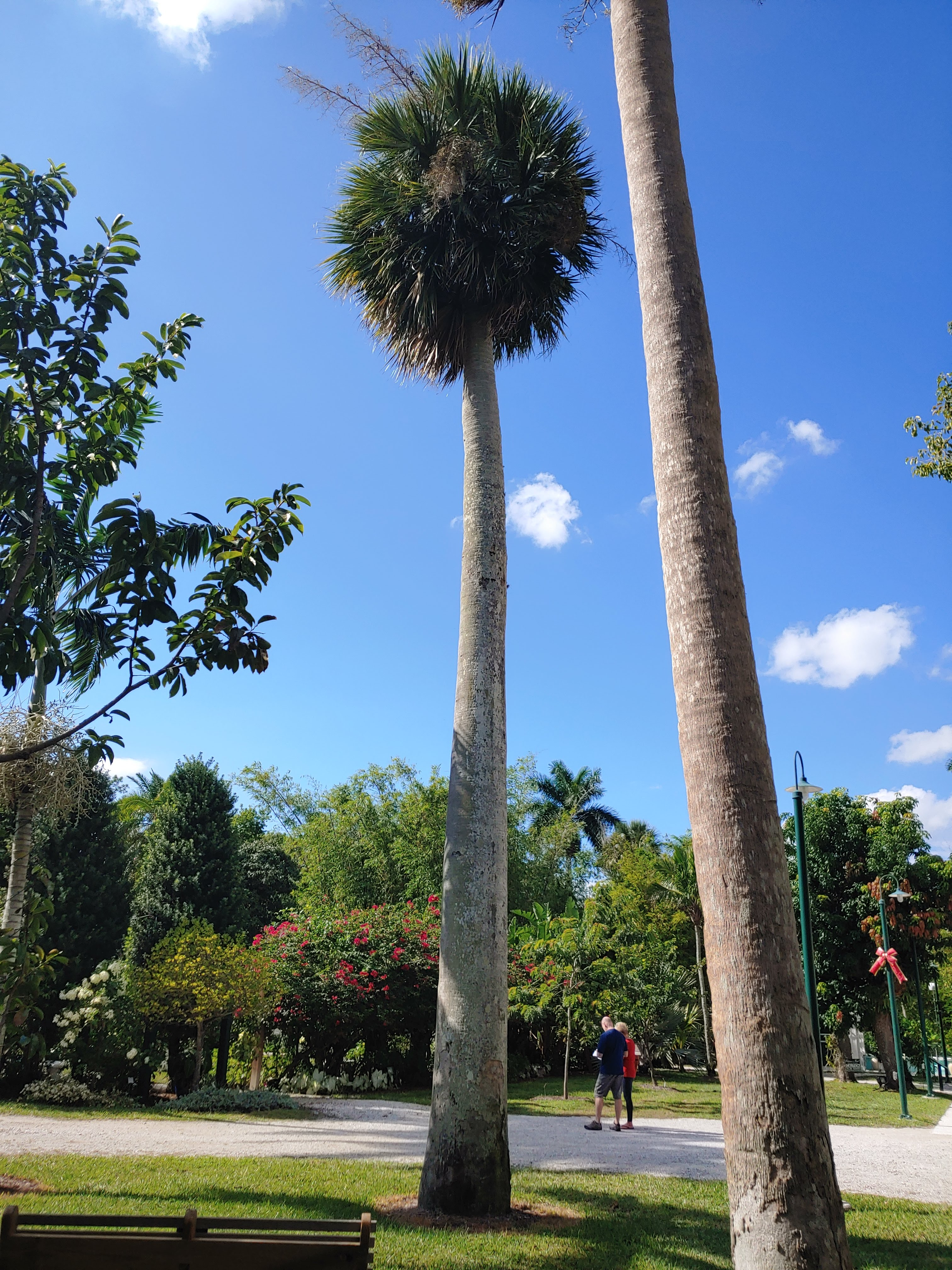
Sabal causiarum planted by Thomas Edison in Fort Myers, Florida

== Distribution ==
Sabal causiarum is found on Hispaniola (in southwestern Haiti and the eastern Dominican Republic), Puerto Rico (including the islands of Mona and Culebra) and in the British Virgin Islands of Anegada, Tortola, and Guana between sea level and 100 metres (328 ft) above sea level. American botanist George Proctor also reported a sight record of the species from Saint Croix in the United States Virgin Islands, as well as specimens from Saint John; however, this has since been dismissed as introductions.

== Uses ==
As is reflected in both the common and scientific names of the species, the leaves of Sabal causiarum are used in the manufacture of hats. In 1901 Orator F. Cook described a hat-making industry centred in the village of Joyuda in Cabo Rojo, which made "large quantities" of hats from the leaves of this species. According to Andrew Henderson, this industry had declined considerably by the 1980s. Leaves of the species are also used to make baskets, mats and hammocks, and older leaves for thatch. It is also planted as an ornamental or street tree due to its "massive, stately appearance".
