= Palmetto =

Palmetto (meaning "little palm") may refer to:

== Palms ==
Several small palms in the Arecaceae (palm tree) family:

- in the genus Sabal:
  - Bermuda palmetto, Sabal bermudana
  - Birmingham palmetto, Sabal 'Birmingham'
  - Cabbage palmetto, Sabal palmetto
  - Dwarf, or bush palmetto, Sabal minor
  - Hispaniola palmetto, Sabal domingensis
  - Jamaica palmetto, Sabal maritima
  - Mexican, Texas, or Rio Grande palmetto, Sabal mexicana
  - Miami palmetto, Sabal miamiensis
  - Puerto Rico palmetto, Sabal causiarum
  - Rosei palmetto, Sabal rosei
  - Royal palmetto, Sabal pumos
  - Scrub palmetto, Sabal etonia
  - Sonoran palmetto, Sabal uresana
  - Yucatán palmetto, Sabal gretheriae
- Palmetto, Chamaerops humilis, native to Europe and north Africa
- Saw palmetto, Serenoa repens, native to North America

== Places ==
- Palmetto, Alabama, an unincorporated community
- Palmetto, California, a former community
- Palmetto, Florida, a city
- Palmetto Bay, Florida, a village
- Palmetto Beach, a neighborhood of Tampa, Florida
- Palmetto Estates, Florida, an unincorporated area and CDP
- Palmetto Historic District, a nationally recognized historic district
- Palmetto, Georgia, a city in Fulton County
- Palmetto, Georgia, an unincorporated community in Oglethorpe County
- Palmetto, Louisiana, a village
- Palmetto, Missouri, an unincorporated community
- Palmetto, Nevada, a ghost town

== Schools ==
- Miami Palmetto High School in Pinecrest, Florida
- Palmetto Bay Academy in Miami, Florida
- Palmetto High School (Florida) in Palmetto, Florida
- Palmetto High School (South Carolina) in Williamston, South Carolina
- Palmetto Ridge High School in Naples, Florida
- Palmetto State e-Cademy, a virtual public charter school in South Carolina

== Transportation ==
- Palmetto (train), an Amtrak passenger train in the United States
- Palmetto (ACL train), a former ACL passenger train in the United States
- Palmetto station in Miami, Florida
- Palmetto Railroad, former railroad in North Carolina and South Carolina
- Palmetto Railway, former railroad in North Carolina and South Carolina
- Palmetto Trail, foot and bike trail in South Carolina
- The Palmetto Expressway, Florida State Road 826

== Entertainment ==
- Palmetto (film), a 1998 neo-noir
- Palmetto Records, an American jazz record label founded in 1990
- Palmetto State Quartet, a gospel group from Greenville, South Carolina
- "The Palmetto State Song", a 1860 song popular during the American Civil War
- Palmetto Pointe, a 2005 TV show
- Palmetto Leaves, an 1873 memoir by Harriet Beecher Stowe

== Other ==
- Palmetto State, the official nickname for the state of South Carolina
- Palmetto (crater), of the moon
- Palmetto Cheese, brand of pimento cheese
- Palmetto Electric
- Palmetto FC Bantams, amateur soccer team in Greenwood, South Carolina
- Order of the Palmetto, the highest civilian honor awarded by the governor of South Carolina
- Palmetto Regiment, military unit of volunteers from South Carolina serving in the Mexican–American War
- CSS Palmetto State, an 1862 Confederate ironclad ship
- Palmetto Island State Park, Louisiana
- Palmetto State Park, Gonzales County, Texas
- Palmetto Mountains, range in Nevada
- Palmetto Health Baptist Columbia, South Carolina
- Palmetto Health Richland, hospital network in Columbia, South Carolina
- Palmetto Health, hospital network in Richland County, South Carolina
- Florida woods cockroach, a.k.a. Palmetto bug, different species from American cockroach
- Palmetto Skipper, Euphyes arpa, a butterfly
- Palmetto Pass, an electronic toll collection system in South Carolina

== See also ==
- Palmetto Bay (disambiguation)
- Palmetto Middle School (disambiguation)
- Palmetto High School (disambiguation)
