= List of hospitals in South Carolina =

List of hospitals in South Carolina (U.S. state), sorted by hospital name.

Name	City	County	Hospital beds	Trauma designation	Affiliation	Notes
Abbeville Area Medical Center	Abbeville	Abbeville	25	—	—	
Aiken Regional Medical Center	Aiken	Aiken	273	—	UHS	
Allendale County Hospital	Fairfax	Allendale	25	—	—	
AnMed Health Cannon	Pickens	Pickens	55	—	AnMed	formerly Cannon Memorial Hospital
AnMed Health Medical Center	Anderson	Anderson	461	Level III	AnMed	
AnMed North Campus	Anderson	Anderson	72	—	AnMed	formerly AnMed Health Women & Children's Hospital
AnMed Piedmont Campus	Piedmont		—	—	AnMed	Freestanding ED; no inpatient beds on site
AnMed Health Rehabilitation Hospital	Anderson	Anderson	60		AnMed	
Beaufort Memorial Hospital	Beaufort	Beaufort	197	Level III	—	
Bon Secours St. Francis Hospital	Charleston	Charleston	200	—	RSFH	
Carolina Center for Behavioral Health	Greer		138	—	—	
Carolina Pines Regional Medical Center	Hartsville	Darlington	116	Level III	ScionHealth	
Cherokee Medical Center	Gaffney	Cherokee	125	—	SRHS	Formerly Novant Health Gaffney Medical Center and later Mary Black Health System - Gaffney
Colleton Medical Center	Walterboro	Colleton	135	—	HCA	
Columbia VA Health Care	Columbia		204	—	VA	
ContinueCare Hospital	Columbia		35	—		
Conway Medical Center	Conway	Horry	210	—	—	
Edgefield County Hospital	Edgefield	Edgefield	25	—	—	
Grand Strand Medical Center	Myrtle Beach	Horry	369	Level I	HCA	
Hampton Regional Medical Center	Varnville	Hampton	32	—	—	
Lexington Medical Center	West Columbia	Lexington	508	Level III	—	
McLeod Health Cheraw	Cheraw	Chesterfield	59	—	McLeod	Formerly Chesterfield General Hospital
McLeod Health Clarendon	Manning	Clarendon	81	—	McLeod	Formerly Clarendon Memorial Hospital
McLeod Health Darlington	Darlington	Darlington	72	—	McLeod	Formerly McLeod Medical Center - Darlington
McLeod Health Dillon	Dillon	Dillon	79	—	McLeod	Formerly McLeod Medical Center - Dillon
McLeod Health Loris	Loris	Horry	50	—	McLeod	Formerly McLeod Medical Center - Loris
McLeod Health Seacoast	Little River	Horry	106	—	McLeod	Formerly McLeod Medical Center - Seacoast
McLeod Regional Medical Center	Florence	Florence	517	Level II	McLeod	
MUSC Health Bamberg-Barnwell Emergency	Denmark	Bamberg	—	—	MUSC	Freestanding ED; no inpatient beds on site.
MUSC Health Black River Medical Center	Cades	Williamsburg	25	—	MUSC	
MUSC Health Chester Medical Center	Chester	Chester	82	—	MUSC	Formerly Chester Regional Medical Center
MUSC Health Columbia Medical Center Downtown	Columbia	Richland	258	—	MUSC	formerly Providence Health
MUSC Health Columbia Medical Center Northeast	Columbia	Richland	74	—	MUSC	Formerly Providence Health Northeast
MUSC Health Fairfield Emergency	Winnsboro	Fairfield	—	—	MUSC	Freestanding ED; no inpatient beds on site. formerly Providence Health Fairfield
MUSC Health Florence Medical Center	Florence	Florence	310 or 396	Level III	MUSC	Formerly Carolinas Hospital System
MUSC Health Kershaw Medical Center	Camden	Kershaw	119	—	MUSC	Formerly KershawHealth Medical Center
MUSC Health Lancaster Medical Center	Lancaster	Lancaster	199 or 211 or 225	—	MUSC	Formerly Springs Memorial Hospital
MUSC Health Marion Medical Center	Mullins	Marion	124	—	MUSC	Formerly Carolinas Hospital System - Marion
MUSC Health Orangeburg	Orangeburg	Orangeburg	286	Level III	MUSC	Formerly Regional Medical Center
MUSC Health University Medical Center	Charleston	Charleston	728	Level I	MUSC	Formerly Medical University of South Carolina Hospital
Newberry Health Hospital	Newberry	Newberry	90	—	—	formerly Newberry County Memorial Hospital
Novant Health Coastal Carolina Medical Center	Hardeeville	Jasper	41	—	Novant	formerly Coastal Carolina Hospital
Novant Health East Cooper Medical Center	Mount Pleasant	Charleston	130	Level III	Novant	
Novant Health Hilton Head Medical Center	Hilton Head Island	Beaufort	109	—	Novant	formerly Hilton Head Hospital
Pelham Medical Center	Greer	Spartanburg	48	—	SRHS	
Piedmont Medical Center	Rock Hill	York	288	Level III	Tenet	
Piedmont Medical Center - Fort Mill	Fort Mill	York	100	—	Tenet	
Piedmont Medical Center - Gold Hill ED	Fort Mill	York	—	—	Tenet	Freestanding ED; no inpatient beds on site
Prisma Health Baptist Easley Hospital	Easley	Pickens	109	—	Prisma	
Prisma Health Baptist Hospital	Columbia	Richland	352	—	Prisma	
Prisma Health Baptist Parkridge Hospital	Columbia	Richland	76	—	Prisma	
Prisma Health Greenville Memorial Hospital	Greenville	Greenville	864	Level I	Prisma	
Prisma Health Greer Memorial Hospital	Greer	Greenville	82	Level III	Prisma	
Prisma Health Hillcrest Hospital	Simpsonville	Greenville	43	—	Prisma	
Prisma Health Laurens County Hospital	Clinton	Laurens	76	—	Prisma	
Prisma Health North Greenville Hospital	Travelers Rest	Greenville	45	—	Prisma	LTAC
Prisma Health Oconee Memorial Hospital	Seneca	Oconee	169	—	Prisma	
Prisma Health Patewood Hospital	Greenville	Greenville	72	—	Prisma	
Prisma Health Richland Hospital	Columbia	Richland	641	Level I	Prisma	
Prisma Health Tuomey Hospital	Sumter	Sumter	283	—	Prisma	
Ralph H. Johnson VA Medical Center	Charleston	Charleston	152	—	VA	
Regency Hospital of Florence	Florence	Florence	40	—	Select Medical	LTAC
Regency Hospital of Greenville	Greenville	Greenville	32	—	Select Medical	LTAC, located within St. Francis Hospital - Downtown
Roper Hospital	Charleston	Charleston	334	—	RSFH	
Roper St. Francis Berkeley Hospital	Summerville	Berkeley	50		RSFH	
Roper St. Francis Mount Pleasant Hospital	Mount Pleasant	Charleston	85	—	RSFH	
Self Regional Healthcare	Greenwood	Greenwood	322 or 358	Level III	—	Formerly Self Memorial Hospital
Shriners Hospitals for Children - Greenville	Greenville	Greenville	50	—	—	
Spartanburg Hospital for Restorative Care	Spartanburg	Spartanburg	97	—	SRHS	
Spartanburg Medical Center	Spartanburg	Spartanburg	540	Level I	SRHS	
Spartanburg Medical Center Mary Black Campus	Spartanburg	Spartanburg	207	—	SRHS	Formerly Mary Black Health System - Spartanburg
St. Francis Downtown	Greenville	Greenville	245	—	RSFH	
St. Francis Eastside	Greenville	Greenville	93	—	RSFH	
Summerville Medical Center	Summerville	Dorchester	124	—	HCA Healthcare	
Tidelands Georgetown Memorial Hospital	Georgetown	Georgetown	131	—	Tidelands/MUSC	
Tidelands Waccamaw Community Hospital	Murrells Inlet	Georgetown	124	—	Tidelands/MUSC	
Trident Medical Center	North Charleston	Charleston	321	Level II	HCA Healthcare	
Union Medical Center	Union	Union	85	—	SRHS	
Closed - Williamsburg Regional Hospital	Kingstree	Williamsburg	25	—	—	Closed (date unknown)
Closed - Fairfield Memorial Hospital	Winnsboro	Fairfield	25	—	—	Closed Dec 18, 2018
Closed - Southern Palmetto Hospital	Barnwell	Barnwell	53	—	—	Formerly Barnwell County Hospital; closed Jan 2016
Closed - Lake City Community Hospital	Lake City	Florence	48	—	—	Closed Dec. 16 2022; replaced by MUSC Health Black River
