= AnMed Maternity Center =

- AnMed Health

Geography
- Location: 2000 E. Greenville St. Anderson, South Carolina, United States
- Coordinates: 34.545°N 82.628°W

Services
- Beds: 72

Links
- Website: http://www.anmedhealth.org
- Lists: Hospitals in South Carolina

The AnMed Maternity Center is a 43,000-square-foot space spread over three floors that features nine labor and delivery rooms, 17 mother-baby suites, two dedicated ORs for C-section deliveries, a Level II nursery and offices for outpatient breastfeeding support and car seat installation services.

AnMed Maternity Center is located at the AnMed Medical Center at 800 N Fant St. in Anderson, SC.
