= Leonardo Bonilha =

Leonardo Bonilha, M.D., Ph.D., is a physician-scientist who serves as Senior Associate Dean for Research at the University of South Carolina Floyd School of Medicine, and Associate Vice-President for Health Sciences Research at the University of South Carolina. Bonilha has more than two decades of experience, having built his career at the intersection of clinical care, neuroscience research, and community outreach. Bonilha earned both his M.D. and Ph.D. in neuroscience at the State University of Campinas (Brazil), completed post-doctoral work in cognitive neuroscience at the University of Nottingham (UK), and underwent neurology residency and clinical neurophysiology fellowship at the Medical University of South Carolina.

Bonilha's research has focused on computational neuroscience, especially how brain networks adapt after neurological injury. In particular, his research interests are in the mechanisms of language impairments following stroke and in epilepsy treatment outcomes.

== Early life and education ==
Bonilha was born and raised in Brazil. He earned his Doctor of Medicine at the State University of Campinas (UNICAMP) in 1999, followed by Neurology Board Certification by the Brazilian Academy of Neurology in 2003. He completed his Ph.D. in Neuroscience at UNICAMP in 2004, where his doctoral work focused on quantitative morphometrical analyses and automated voxel-based morphometry of limbic abnormalities in temporal lobe epilepsy.

Following his graduate studies, Bonilha moved to the United Kingdom to pursue a post-doctoral fellowship in cognitive neuroscience and functional neuroimaging methods at the University of Nottingham from February 2004 to August 2005.

Bonilha relocated to the University of South Carolina, where he served as a Research Assistant Professor from 2005 to 2007. Afterwards, having decided to resume his career in medicine, he completed an internal medicine internship at the Medical University of South Carolina (MUSC) from 2007 to 2008, followed by a neurology residency from 2008 to 2011 and a clinical neurophysiology fellowship from 2011 to 2012.

== Career ==
Bonilha joined the faculty at MUSC in 2012, where he served multiple clinical and academic roles, including the Director of the Neurology Residency Clinic, Director of the Language and Aphasia Clinic, Director of the Level 4 Comprehensive Epilepsy Center, Medical Director of the Stroke Recovery Research Center, Vice Chair for Research for the Department of Neurology and the Smart State Endowed Chair for Neuroimaging. Bonilha transitioned to Emory University in 2022, where he became a Professor of Neurology, Vice-Chair of Research and Director of the Emory Comprehensive Epilepsy Center.

Bonilha rejoined the University of South Carolina Floyd School of Medicine in 2023, following a national search, to serve as Senior Associate Dean for Research. In this role, he also became Director of the newly formed USC Brain Health Network, a statewide initiative aimed at expanding access to neurological and cognitive-health care, particularly in rural communities. Since assuming the position, he has led efforts to strengthen the school's research infrastructure and helped guide development of the USC Brain Health Center, which will include advanced neuroimaging resources such as South Carolina's first 7-Tesla MRI. He continues to maintain clinical practice at the Prisma Health Neurology Group, while advancing research programs in brain health, language recovery after stroke, epilepsy, and neurodegenerative disorders.

== Research contributions ==
Bonilha's research centers on understanding how large-scale brain networks support language, cognition, and epilepsy, with a particular emphasis on structural neuroimaging and computational modeling.

His work on aphasia helped establish how white-matter disconnection and network fragmentation drive aphasia severity and influence recovery after stroke. Bonilha pioneered work on diffusion MRI, diffusion tractography, and connectome lesion-symptom mapping, demonstrating that residual structural connectivity predicts treatment response, language outcomes, and long-term recovery trajectories in individuals with post-stroke aphasia. Bonilha has also been actively engaged with the Center for Aphasia Recovery (C-STAR at USC, led by Julius Fridriksson). With C-STAR, Bonilha has participated in and led several NIH-funded clinical trials on aphasia recovery. More recently, Bonilha has pioneered the identification of the importance of small vessel disease, premature brain aging, and neuroplasticity among stroke survivors with aphasia.

In epilepsy, Bonilha pioneered the investigation of limbic abnormalities in temporal lobe epilepsy. He was one of the first investigators to demonstrate morphometric abnormalities in entorhinal, perirhinal, thalamus, and extra-temporal limbic regions among patients with temporal lobe epilepsy. Subsequently, he pioneered the use of connectome-based biomarkers to classify temporal lobe epilepsy and predict surgical outcomes, helping define network-level mechanisms underlying pharmacoresistance and seizure propagation. His research further introduced reproducible methods for mapping the human structural connectome and applying deep learning to epilepsy imaging data. More recently, he pioneered the work on AI-aided diagnosis of temporal lobe epilepsy MRI markers using convolutional neural networks.

Across both domains, his work integrates advanced MRI analytics, machine learning and AI, and network computational neuroscience to clarify the mechanisms through which brain architecture supports neurological function and guides personalized treatment strategies.

== Selected publications ==
This list includes a selection of Bonilha's publications chosen for their influence, methodological innovation, or representation of key areas of his research. It is not a complete bibliography. A full list of his publications is available through his Google Scholar profile in the External links section.

Aphasia, Language Networks, and Stroke Recovery

- Fridriksson, J., Hubbard, H. I., Hudspeth, S. G., Holland, A., Bonilha, L., Fromm, D., & Rorden, C. (2012). Speech entrainment enables patients with Broca's aphasia to produce fluent speech. Brain, 135(12), 3815–3829. https://doi.org/10.1093/brain/aws301
- Fridriksson, J., den Ouden, D. B., Hillis, A. E., Hickok, G., Rorden, C., Basilakos, A., Yourganov, G., & Bonilha, L. (2018). Anatomy of aphasia revisited. Brain, 141(3), 848–862. https://doi.org/10.1093/brain/awx363
- Bonilha, L., Hillis, A. E., Hickok, G., den Ouden, D. B., Rorden, C., & Fridriksson, J. (2017). Temporal lobe networks supporting the comprehension of spoken words. Brain, 140(9), 2370–2380. https://doi.org/10.1093/brain/awx169
- Yourganov, G., Fridriksson, J., Rorden, C., Gleichgerrcht, E., & Bonilha, L. (2016). Multivariate connectome-based symptom mapping in post-stroke patients. Journal of Neuroscience, 36(25), 6668–6679. https://doi.org/10.1523/JNEUROSCI.4396-15.2016
- McKinnon, E. T., Fridriksson, J., Glenn, G. R., Jensen, J. H., Helpern, J. A., Basilakos, A., Rorden, C., Shih, A. Y., Spampinato, M. V., & Bonilha, L. (2017). Structural plasticity of the ventral stream and aphasia recovery. Annals of Neurology, 82(1), 147–151. https://doi.org/10.1002/ana.24983
- Marebwa, B. K., Fridriksson, J., Yourganov, G., Feenaughty, L., Rorden, C., & Bonilha, L. (2017). Chronic post-stroke aphasia severity is determined by fragmentation of residual white matter networks. Scientific Reports, 7, 8188. https://doi.org/10.1038/s41598-017-07607-9
- Fridriksson, J., Elm, J., Stark, B. C., Basilakos, A., Rorden, C., Sen, S., George, M.S., & Bonilha, L. (2018). Transcranial direct current stimulation vs sham stimulation to treat aphasia after stroke: A randomized clinical trial. JAMA Neurology, 75(12), 1470–1476. https://doi.org/10.1001/jamaneurol.2018.2287
- Basilakos, A., Fillmore, P., Rorden, C., Guo, D., Bonilha, L., & Fridriksson, J. (2014). Regional white matter damage predicts speech fluency in chronic post-stroke aphasia. Frontiers in Human Neuroscience, 8, 845. https://doi.org/10.3389/fnhum.2014.00845
- Fridriksson, J., Kjartansson, O., Morgan, P. S., Hjaltason, H., Magnusdottir, S., Bonilha, L., & Rorden, C. (2010). Impaired speech repetition and left parietal lobe damage. Journal of Neuroscience, 30(33), 11057–11061. https://doi.org/10.1523/JNEUROSCI.1120-10.2010

Epilepsy, Connectomics, and Surgical Outcomes

- Bonilha, L., Jensen, J. H., Baker, N., Breedlove, J., Nesland, T., Lin, J. J., Drane, D. L., Saindane, A. M., Binder, J. R., & Kuzniecky, R. I. (2015). The brain connectome as a personalized biomarker of seizure outcomes after temporal lobectomy. Neurology, 84(18), 1846–1853. https://doi.org/10.1212/WNL.0000000000001548
- Bonilha, L., Nesland, T., Rorden, C., & Fridriksson, J. (2013). Presurgical connectome and postsurgical seizure control in temporal lobe epilepsy. Neurology, 81(19), 1704–1710. https://doi.org/10.1212/01.wnl.0000435306.95271.5f
- Gleichgerrcht, E., Keller, S. S., Drane, D. L., Munsell, B. C., Davis, K. A., Kaestner, E., Weber, B., Krantz, S., Vandergrift, W. A., Edwards, J. C., McDonald, C. R., Kuzniecky, R., & Bonilha, L. (2020). Temporal lobe epilepsy surgical outcomes can be inferred based on structural connectome hubs: A machine learning study. Annals of Neurology, 88(5), 970–983. https://doi.org/10.1002/ana.25888
- Gleichgerrcht, E., Munsell, B., Bhatia, S., Vandergrift, W. A., Rorden, C., McDonald, C., Edwards, J., Kuzniecky, R., & Bonilha, L. (2018). Deep learning applied to whole-brain connectome to determine seizure control after epilepsy surgery. Epilepsia, 59(9), 1643–1654. https://doi.org/10.1111/epi.14528

Neuroimaging Methods and Connectome Science

- Bonilha, L., Gleichgerrcht, E., Nesland, T., Rorden, C., Fridriksson, J., Paulus, W., Helms, G., & Focke, N. K. (2015). Reproducibility of the structural brain connectome derived from diffusion tensor imaging. PLOS ONE, 10(8), e0135247. https://doi.org/10.1371/journal.pone.0135247
- Bonilha, L., Nesland, T., Rorden, C., Fillmore, P., Ratnayake, R. P., & Fridriksson, J. (2014). Assessing the clinical effect of residual cortical disconnection after ischemic strokes. Stroke, 45(4), 988–993. https://doi.org/10.1161/STROKEAHA.113.004137

== Honors and awards ==
Bonilha has received several recognitions for his scientific contributions, clinical excellence, and academic leadership. Early in his career, he was awarded a merit-based 6-year scholarship for research training during medical school (the Special Training Program from the Foundation within the Ministry of Education in Brazil entitled Coordination for the Improvement of Higher Education Personnel - CAPES). Subsequently, he was awarded a PhD tuition scholarship from the Brazilian National Council for Scientific and Technological Development (CNPq) (2002–2003), followed by the Young Investigator Bursary Award at the 25th International Epilepsy Congress in Lisbon (2003) and a Young Investigator Travel Award from the American Epilepsy Society (2008). While in residency at the Medical University of South Carolina, he received multiple distinctions, including three Best Presentation awards at Neurology Resident Research Day (2009–2011) and the highest score on the Residency In-Service Training Examination in each of those same years (2009–2011). He later earned the MUSC College of Medicine Faculty Excellence Award (2014–2015).

In recognition of his research leadership in neuroimaging and epilepsy, Bonilha was appointed to the Smart State Endowed Chair for Neuroimaging and the Admiral E. Pihl Endowed Chair for Neurosciences and Neurology Research in 2019. He was elected to the American Society of Clinical Investigation in 2023 and received the Dorothea Krebs Neurology Professorship Endowment that same year. Most recently, he was awarded the Smart State Endowed Chair for Regenerative Medicine and the USC Patient Engagement Studio Leadership Champion in 2024. Furthermore, in 2024, Bonilha received the Teacher of the Year award from the USC – Prisma Health Neurology Residency Program.

== Personal life ==
Bonilha lives in Columbia, South Carolina, United States, with his wife Heather, and their two children. Heather Bonilha is a professor at the University of South Carolina, where she serves as the Doctoral Program Graduate Director in the department of Communication Sciences and Disorders.
