= Daniel Paul Folk II =

American politician

Member of the South Carolina House of Representatives
- In office 1961–1967

Personal details
- Born: August 28, 1927 Wauchula, Florida, U.S.
- Died: May 6, 1975 (aged 47)
- Children: 4
- Education: Clemson College; Newberry College

Daniel Paul Folk II (August 28, 1927 – May 6, 1975) was an American politician. He served as a member of the South Carolina House of Representatives.

== Life and career ==
Folk was born in Wauchula, Florida. He attended Denmark High School, Clemson College and Newberry College.

In 1961, Folk was elected to the South Carolina House of Representatives, representing Newberry County, South Carolina.

Folk died on May 6, 1975 at the Newberry County Memorial Hospital, at the age of 47.
