= Providence Hospital (Columbia, South Carolina) =

Geography
- Location: Columbia, South Carolina, United States
- Coordinates: 34.014735°N 81.013499°W

Services
- Beds: 304

History
- Opened: 1938

Links
- Website: www.yourprovidencehealth.com
- Lists: Hospitals in South Carolina

Providence Hospitals was a two hospital health care system with 304 licensed beds. It is located in downtown Columbia, South Carolina, and was founded by the Sisters of Charity of Saint Augustine in 1938. The facility specialises in cardiac care, provided through the Providence Heart & Vascular Institute, which is recognized statewide as a referral center for the prevention, diagnosis and treatment of cardiovascular disease.

Providence Hospital Northeast was established in 1999 and offers a range of medical services in surgery, emergency care, women's and children's services and rehabilitation. Providence Northeast is home to Providence Orthopaedic & Neuro Spine Institute, which provides medical and surgical treatment of diseases and injuries of the bones, joints and spine.

The board of Medical University of South Carolina voted to acquire the hospital system in 2021. The hospitals had their names changed, and are now in MUSC Health.
