= Lexington Medical Center =

- Lexington County Health Service District, Inc.

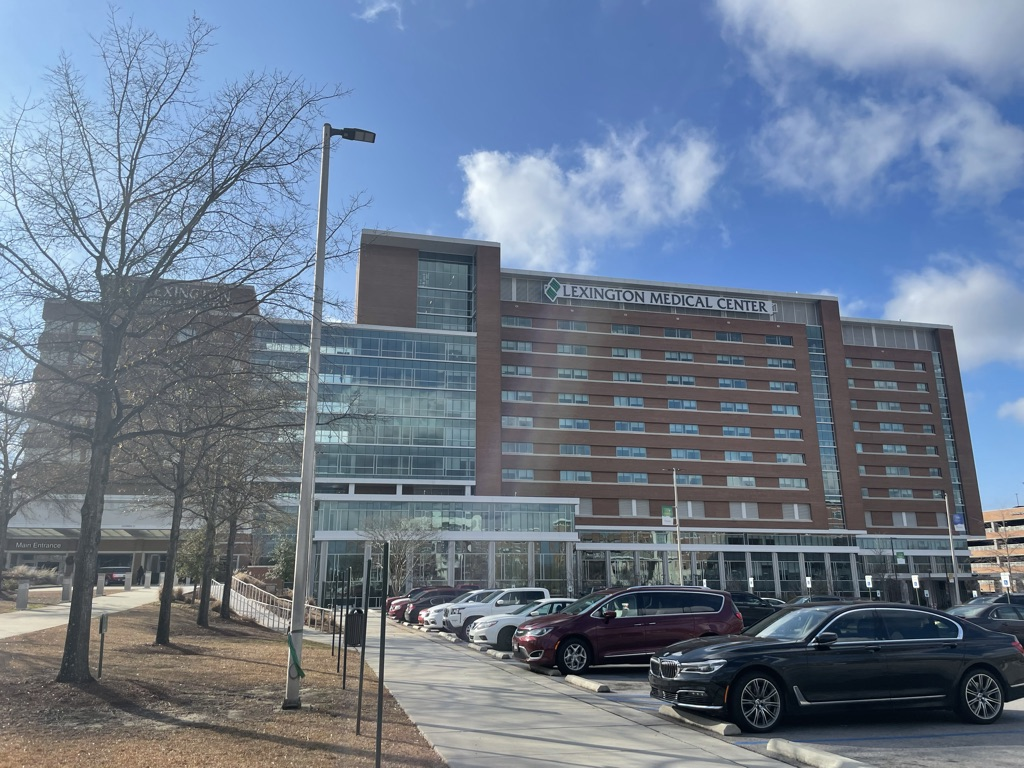
- North Tower of the LMC

Geography
- Location: 2720 Sunset Blvd, West Columbia, South Carolina, United States

Organization
- Care system: Private Company, Public Service
- Type: General
- Affiliated university: Duke University School of Medicine

Services
- Standards: CMS accreditation
- Emergency department: Level III trauma center
- Beds: 557

History
- Founded: January 6, 1971 (as Lexington County Hospital)

Links
- Website: https://lexhealth.com/ Lexington Health
- Lists: Hospitals in South Carolina
- Other links: List of hospitals in the United States

Lexington Medical Center is a medical complex in West Columbia, South Carolina. Lexington Medical Center is owned by Lexington County Health Service District, Inc., a private company. The network includes six community medical centers, an occupational health facility, the largest nursing home in the Carolinas, an Alzheimer's disease care center, and seventy physician practices in a variety of services.

== Cardiovascular care ==
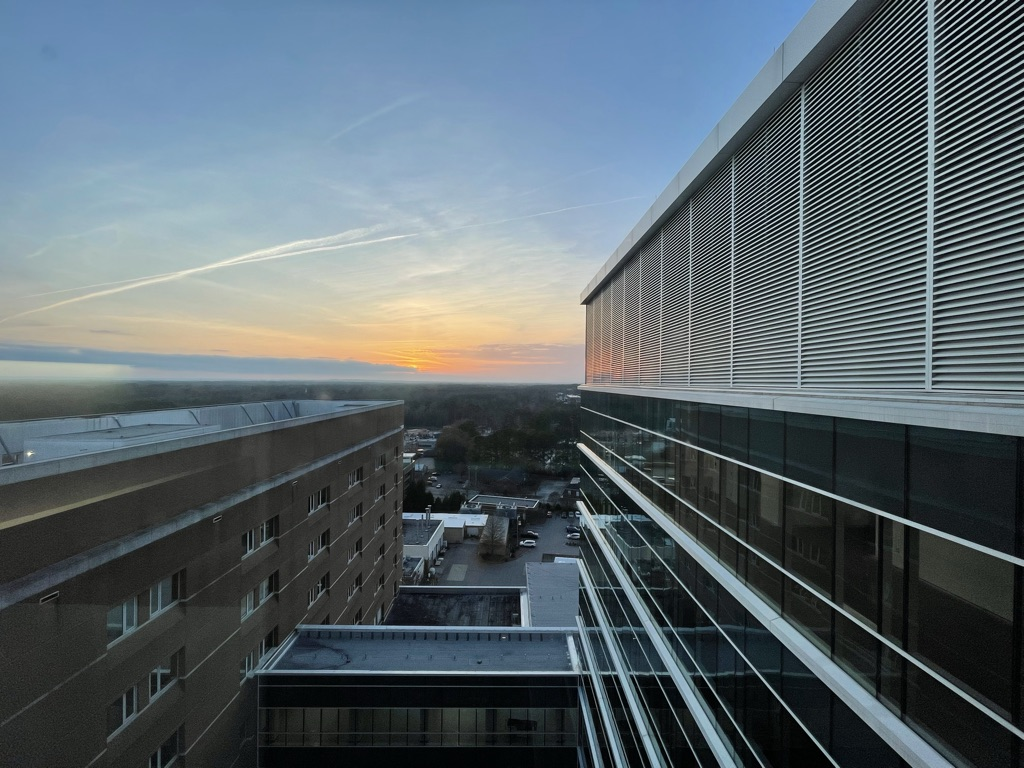
Image from the 12th floor of one of the towers at Lexington Medical Center.

A Duke Medicine affiliate, Lexington Medical Center began its complete cardiac care program in 2012. To date, the hospital has performed more than 600 open heart surgeries.

Lexington Medical Center has also earned full chest pain accreditation with percutaneous coronary intervention (PCI) from the Society of Cardiovascular Patient Care (SCPC).

In 2014, Lexington Medical Center began to offer transcatheter aortic valve replacement, known as TAVR. This cardiovascular technology allows doctors to replace the aortic valve with a catheter procedure instead of open heart surgery.

Additionally, Lexington Medical Center now offers non-surgical closure for holes in the heart called atrial septal defects (ASDs) and patent foramen ovale (PFO).

Lexington Medical Center has developed an advanced electrophysiology program to diagnose and treat patients with cardiac arrhythmias. In addition, the program has an experienced team of cardiologists that implant cardiac devices including pacemakers, defibrillators, and biventricular pacing systems. Lexington Medical Center has also begun to use insertable cardiac monitors, commonly known as loop recorders, to diagnose heart rhythm problems.

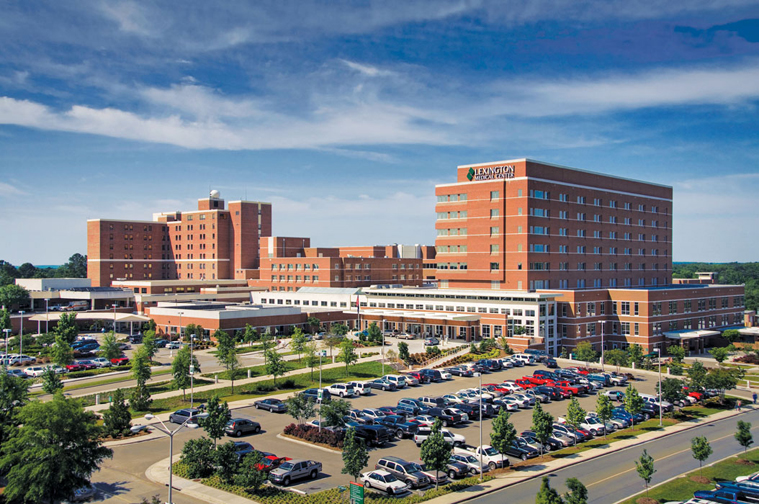
Main Campus in West Columbia, South Carolina before the construction of the North Tower.

== Surgery ==
Lexington Medical Center performs more surgeries than any other hospital in the Midlands of South Carolina. In fiscal year 2013, the hospital performed 21,796 surgeries in more than 30 operating rooms on the hospital's main campus and community medical centers located around Lexington County, South Carolina.

Lexington Medical Center is a Bariatric Surgery Center of Excellence.

== Cancer ==
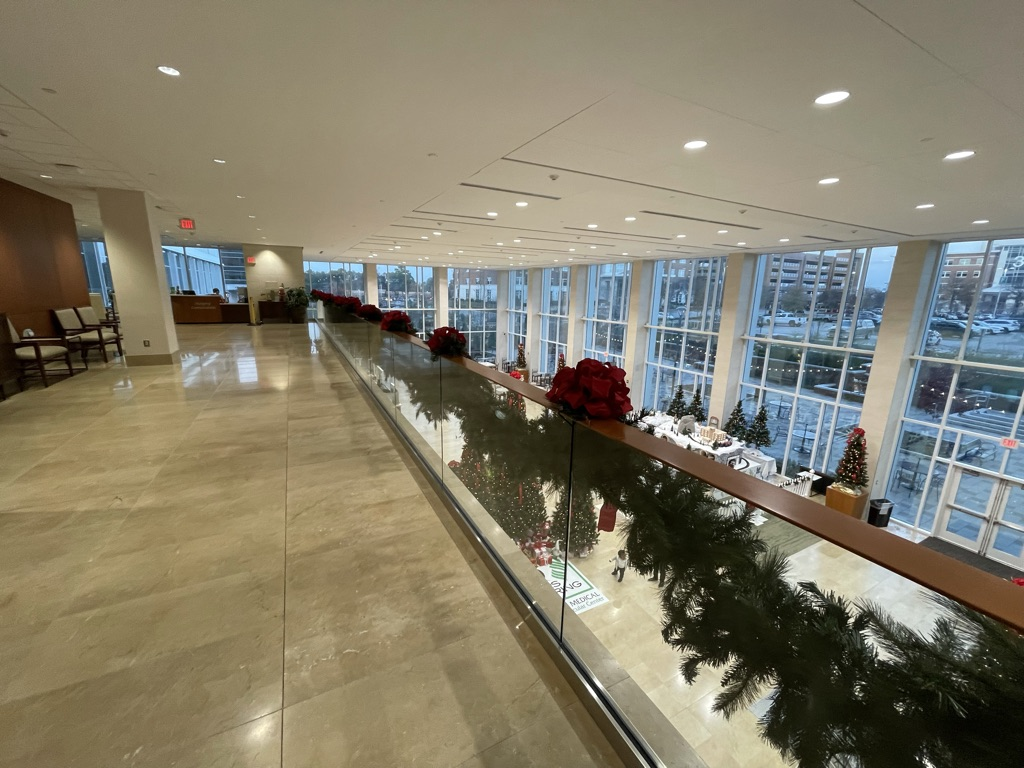
Inside the Lexington Medical Center during the Christmas season.

Lexington Medical Center's cancer program is affiliated with the Duke Cancer Institute.

The Cancer Services program participates in clinical research. And, the affiliation with Duke provides patients with access to Duke's cancer care, research and education.

Lexington Medical Center offers a lung cancer screening program. The radiation medicine department has a TrueBeam linear accelerator and stereotactic radiation capabilities. The cancer program also has three nurse navigators, research nurses, social workers and quality of life programs including art classes and support groups.

Lexington Medical Center diagnoses approximately 250 breast cancer patients each year. The hospital's breast program has accreditation from the National Accreditation Program for Breast Centers (NAPBC) and the American College of Radiology (ACR). Lexington Medical Center has four Women's Imaging centers and a mobile mammography van, all offering digital mammography.

== Physician network ==
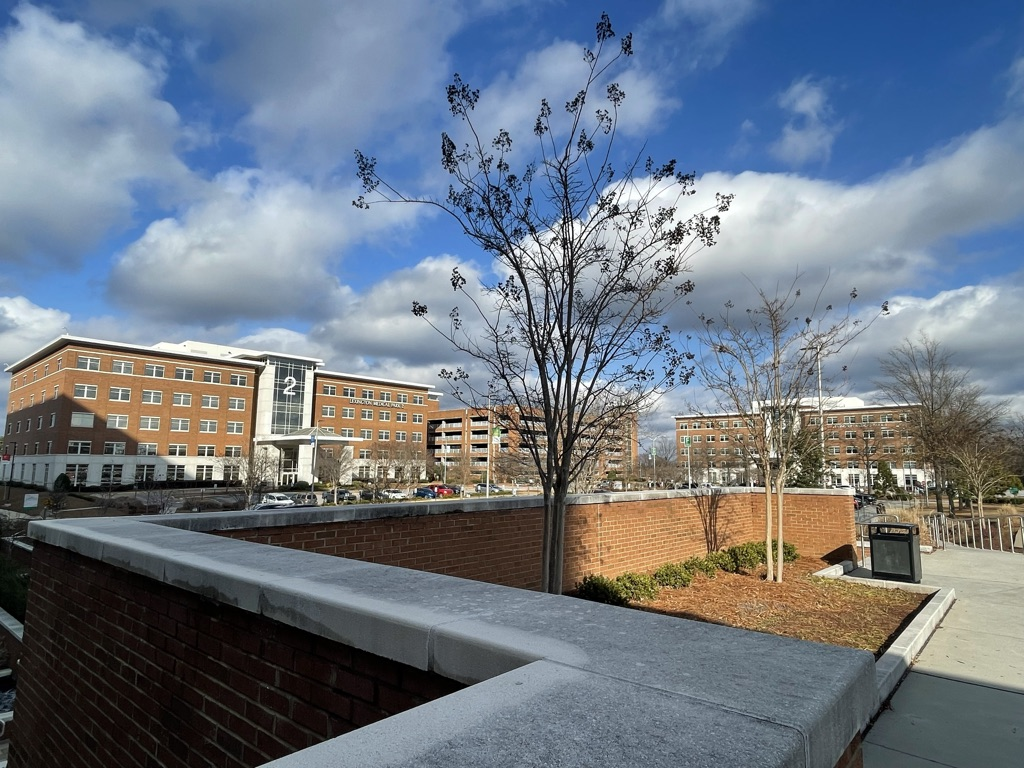
Physician offices of LMC

Lexington Medical Center employs more than 275 doctors in 58 physician practices around the Midlands. Representing a wide variety of specialties, these doctors are among the health care providers in the Southeast. In fiscal year 2013, they logged nearly 857,000 patient visits.

Lexington Medical Center was the first hospital in the Midlands to perform single-incision laparoscopic surgery. The hospital was the first in South Carolina to perform microwave ablation for tumors and single-incision hysterectomy. It was also among the first hospitals in the nation to perform minimally invasive endovascular surgery that repairs aortic aneurysms with a catheter.

Lexington Medical Center Physician Network Specialties: Anesthesiology, Cardiology, Cardiovascular Surgery, Emergency Medicine, Endocrinology, ENT & Allergy, Family Practice, General Surgery, Hospitalists, Infectious Disease, Internal Medicine, Neurology, OB/GYN, Occupational Health, Oncology, Ophthalmology, Orthopaedics, Pain Management, Pediatrics, Plastic Surgery, Psychiatry, Pulmonology, Radiation Oncology, Radiology, Rheumatology Urgent Care and Urologic Surgery

== Environmental ==
Lexington Medical Center received the Leadership in Energy and Environmental Design (LEED) silver certification from the Green Building Council for its Lexington Medical Park 2. The building was the first health care building in South Carolina to receive that distinction.

== Hospital rating data ==
The HealthGrades website contains the clinical quality data for Lexington Medical Center, as of 2017. For this rating section, three different types of data from HealthGrades are presented: clinical quality ratings for twenty-six inpatient conditions and procedures, thirteen patient safety indicators and the percentage of patients giving the hospital as a 9 or 10 (the two highest possible ratings).

For inpatient conditions and procedures, there are three possible ratings: worse than expected, as expected, better than expected. For this hospital, the data for this category is:

- Worse than expected - 6
- As expected - 20
- Better than expected - 0

For patient safety indicators, there are the same three possible ratings. For this hospital safety indicators were rated as:

- Worse than expected - 0
- As expected - 10
- Better than expected - 3

Percentage of patients rating this hospital as a 9 or 10 - 76% Percentage of patients who on average rank hospitals as a 9 or 10 - 69%
