= Nina Littlejohn =

Nina Littlejohn (February 28, 1879 - February 28, 1963) was an African American entrepreneur and healthcare advocate from South Carolina. She co-founded the John-Nina Hospital in Spartanburg, which was a black owned medical facility that provided care to African Americans during a segregated time.

== Early and family life ==
Nina Littlejohn was born at Wheat Hill in Cherokee County, South Carolina on February 28, 1879. She grew up with her parents, Emanuel and Alice Littlejohn, who were landowning farmers. They cultivated crops and raised animals such as bees and horses, they taught Nina trade at a young age. However, instead of following in her parents' footsteps, Nina chose a different path for herself as an entrepreneur. In 1895, she married Worth Littlejohn, a barber who worked with white clientele. Together the two had one daughter and moved to Spartanburg, South Carolina, where they built their own house on 218 North Dean Street.

== Career ==
In 1913, Nina Littlejohn and her husband established the two story, black owned and operated John-Nina Hospital adjacent to their house on North Dean Street. From 1913 to 1932 the licensed hospital provided medical care specifically for African Americans who previously did not have access to proper medical care. The medical facility was the only hospital licensed in Spartanburg County in the period. The hospital had space for 36 patients consisting of two wards, eight semiprivate rooms, and an operating room. Additionally, the hospital contained a full kitchen where meals were prepared for patients using supplies from Worth Littlejohn's garden.

To enhance her knowledge and contribute to the success of the hospital, Littlejohn attended business classes at Claflin College in Orangeburg, South Carolina. In addition to her studies, she was a member of the Spartanburg Area Chamber of Commerce, which aided her politically in advocating for the healthcare needs of African Americans. While Littlejohn established herself politically, Worth utilized his business connections from the barbershop to help with their finances.

In the 1920s, the hospital faced threats and two fires. The arsonists were found and detained, but their ultimate goal was to shut down the hospital and medical facility due to a dispute with Littlejohn.

In 1932, Spartanburg General Hospital took over the John-Nina Hospital, but Littlejohn's influence remained. A special section in the hospital was preserved for African Americans. Eventually, the Spartanburg General Hospital was also bought out, and the building now operates as Callahams-Funeral Home.

== Hardship ==
Two people, Mildred Gordon and Jimmie Dresswold, were arrested for attempting to burn the John-Nina Hospital down. In 1920, there were two fires at the facility. These fires were set by arsonists who didn't want the facility to have a future and wanted it to end. The hospital remained intact after the damage. One of the two detained people confessed that the fire was set due to an altercation with Nina Littlejohn, which got heated and resulted in the incident.

== Death ==
Worth Littlejohn passed away, and Nina Littlejohn remarried to a Mr. Hunter, who also eventually died, leaving Littlejohn widowed for the second time. On February 28, 1963, Nina Littlejohn died. She was buried in Lincoln Memorial Garden.
