= Grand Strand Medical Center =

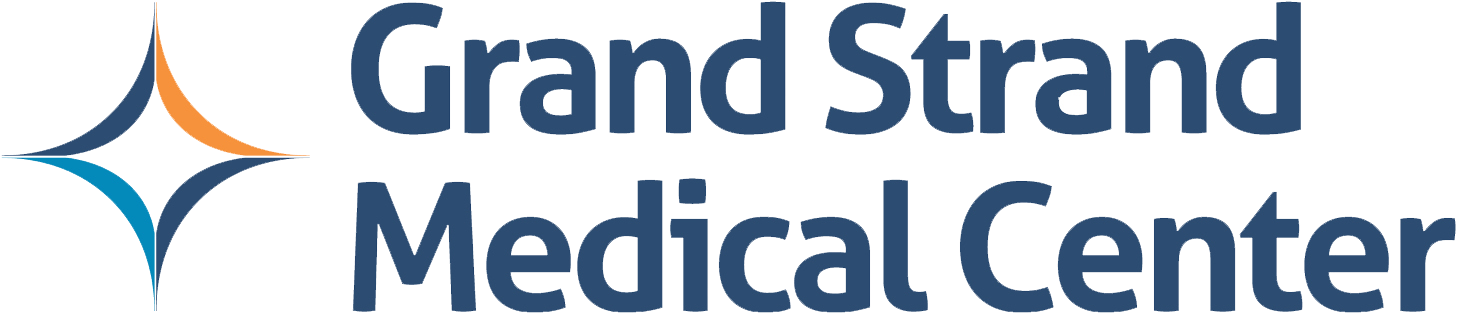

Geography
- Location: Myrtle Beach, South Carolina, United States
- Coordinates: 33°45′29″N 78°49′08″W

Organization
- Funding: For-profit hospital

Services
- Emergency department: Level I Adult Trauma Center / Level II Pediatric Trauma Center
- Beds: 403

History
- Opened: 1978

Links
- Website: mygrandstrandhealth.com
- Lists: Hospitals in South Carolina

Grand Strand Medical Center (formerly Grand Strand Regional Medical Center) is a for-profit, 403-bed hospital in Myrtle Beach, South Carolina owned and operated by HCA Healthcare.

== History ==
Grand Strand Medical Center originally opened in 1978 as Grand Strand Regional Medical Center. Since then, the hospital has undergone multiple additions, including a $15 million, 15,000-square-foot addition in 2014 to enhance the pediatrics, medical surgery, and intensive care departments. In 2021, the hospital added an additional 32 patient beds as part of a $14.5 million, 24,000 square foot expansion. Galen College of Nursing opened a campus at Grand Strand Medical Center in 2022.

== Facilities ==
The hospital is an American College of Surgeons-verified Level I trauma center, Level II pediatric trauma center, and a DNV-GL certified Comprehensive Stroke Center. The hospital also offers cardiac surgery, neurosurgery, and a pediatric intensive care unit (PICU).
