= Prisma Health Baptist Hospital =

- Prisma Health
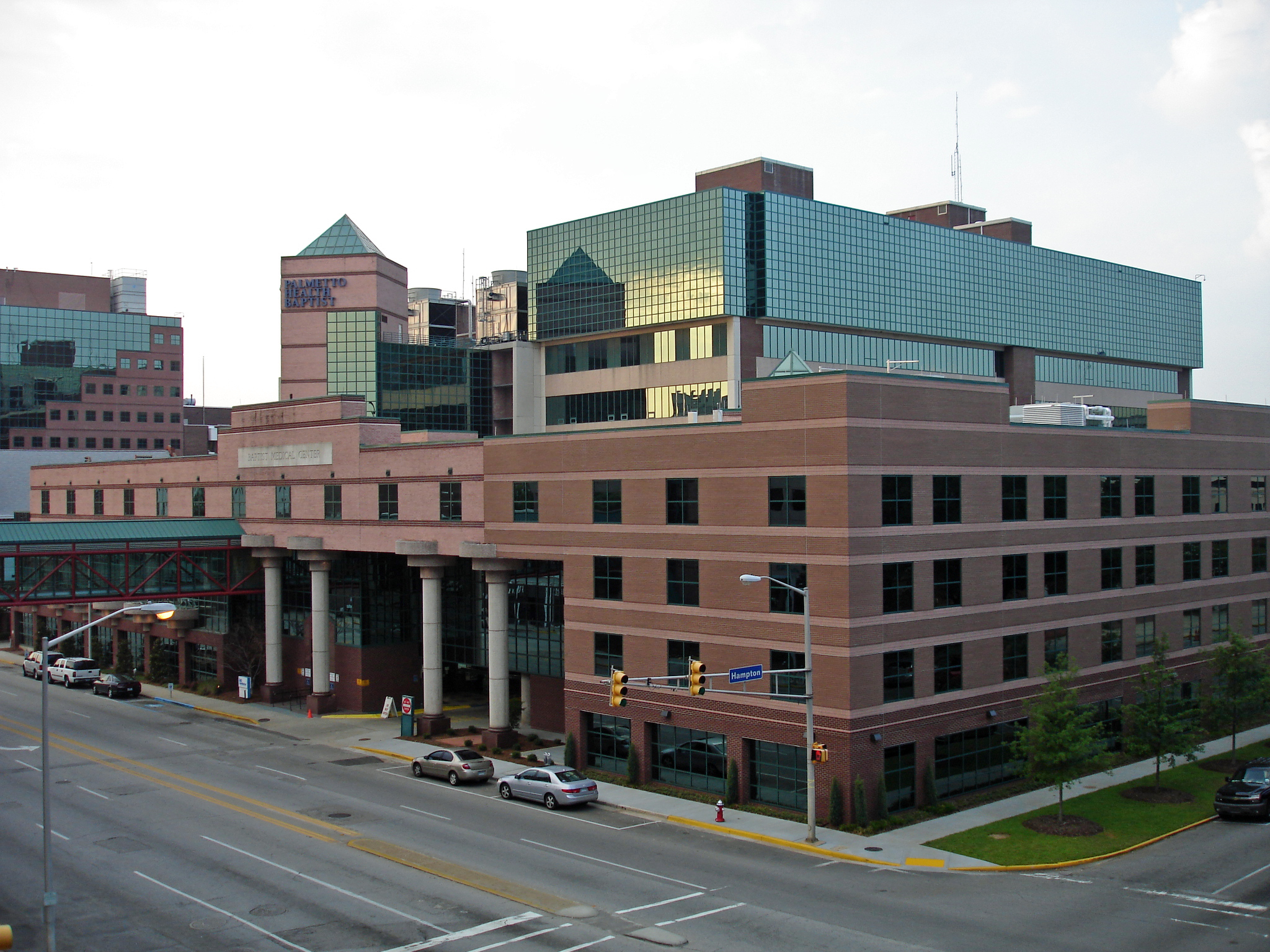

Geography
- Location: Columbia, South Carolina, United States
- Coordinates: 34.0069°N 81.033°W

Organization
- Type: General

Services
- Emergency department: Yes
- Beds: 352

History
- Founded: 1914 (as South Carolina Baptist Hospital); 1980 (as Baptist Medical Center; 1998 as Palmetto Health Baptist Columbia); 2017 (as Prisma Health Baptist Hospital)

Links
- Website: prismahealth.org/locations/hospitals/baptist-hospital
- Lists: Hospitals in South Carolina

Prisma Health Baptist Hospital (Formerly Baptist Medical Center and Palmetto Health Baptist Columbia) is a 352-bed acute-care facility located at the intersection of Taylor and Marion Streets in Downtown Columbia, South Carolina. Prisma Health Baptist Hospital is one of the Midlands’ premier referral centers. The hospital features specialty areas that include bariatrics, behavioral care, endoscopy, OB/GYN, oncology, orthopedics, surgery and urology services. The surrounding campus houses several of the area’s top specialty programs and facilities.

The hospital was established in 1914 as South Carolina Baptist Hospital by the South Carolina Baptist Convention after the widow of Dr. Augustus B. Knowlton, a prominent Columbia physician, asked the church to purchase the hospital, at that time a 70-bed facility on Marion St., that she and her husband started. Over the years, the hospital expanded and grew as additional services were offered. Baptist Columbia became part of the Baptist Healthcare System when a second Baptist hospital was built in Easley, South Carolina in 1958. In 1998, the two-hospital Baptist Healthcare System merged with Richland Memorial Hospital to form Palmetto Health, the largest healthcare system in South Carolina at the time. In 2017, Palmetto Health merged with the Greenville Hospital System to form Prisma Health and continues as the largest not-for profit hospital operator in South Carolina.
