= Palmetto Bay =

Palmetto Bay may refer to:

- Palmetto Bay, Florida
- Palmetto Bay, Barbados

== See also ==
- Palmetto (disambiguation)
