= Spartanburg Regional Healthcare System =

Geography
- Location: 34.96785°N 81.94034°W, Spartanburg, South Carolina, United States

Organization
- Care system: Public
- Type: Not-for-profit
- Affiliated university: Medical University of South Carolina Virginia College of Osteopathic Medicine (VCOM)

Services
- Standards: DNV
- Emergency department: 5
- Beds: 1,350 licensed acute beds

History
- Founded: 1921

Links
- Website: http://www.spartanburgregional.com
- Lists: Hospitals in South Carolina

Spartanburg Regional Healthcare System (SRHS) is an integrated healthcare delivery system that provides care from one's birth through the senior years at one of South Carolina's largest healthcare systems. The system has six hospital campuses, five emergency centers including a Level 1 Trauma Center, neonatal intensive care unit, Gibbs Cancer Center and services that include primary, secondary and tertiary acute care, post-acute care and a broad range of outpatient care and diagnostic services. The system draws patients primarily from Spartanburg, Cherokee, Union and Greenville counties.

== Overview ==
=== Spartanburg Medical Center ===
Spartanburg Medical Center is a research and teaching hospital with two locations in Spartanburg: Spartanburg Medical Center campus on East Wood Street and Spartanburg Medical Center — Mary Black Campus on Skylyn Drive. With a total of 747 beds, Spartanburg Medical Center offers diagnosis and treatment for Upstate South Carolina residents. Formerly Mary Black Memorial Hospital, Spartanburg Medical Center—Mary Black Campus became part of Spartanburg Regional Healthcare System in 2019.

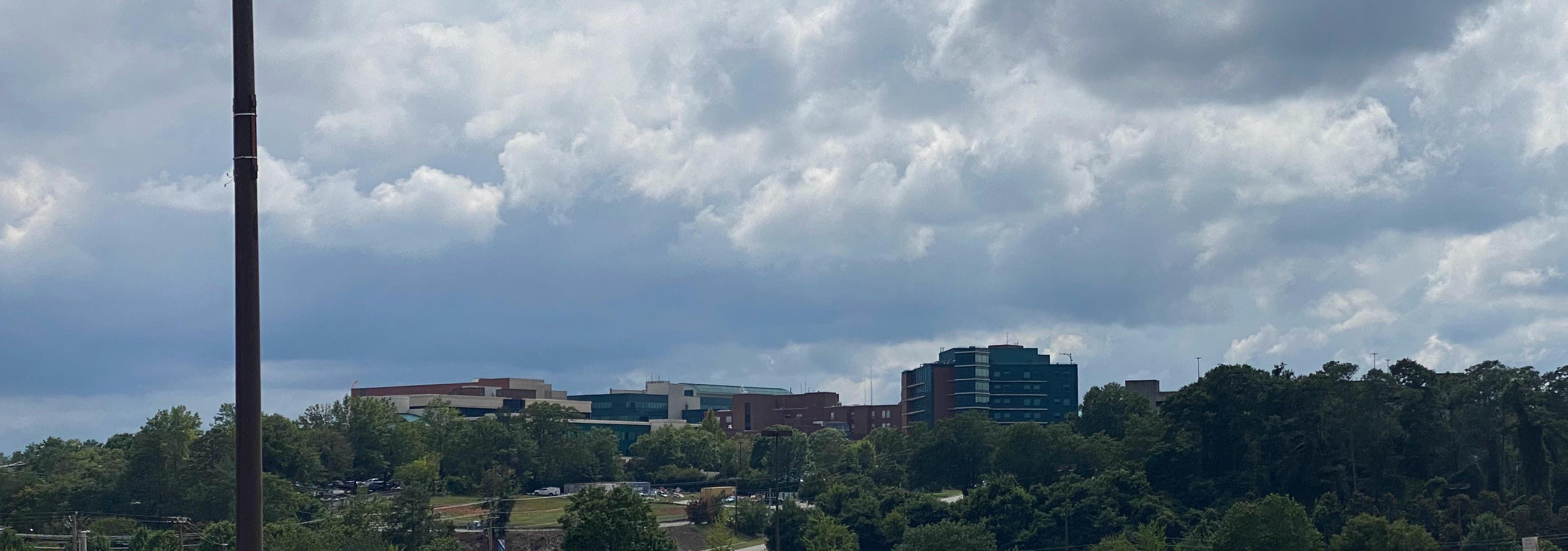
Spartanburg Medical Center

Spartanburg Medical Center includes the Heart Center, Gibbs Cancer Center & Research Institute, Women's Health Services, Weight Loss Services, Rehabilitation Services, Neonatal Intensive Care Unit Services, Sleep Centers, Pediatric Intensive Care Unit, and the Regional Outpatient Center.

Spartanburg Medical Center was the first hospital in the U.S. to develop a comprehensive Hospital Emergency Response Team (HERT). HERT was developed after Spartanburg Regional mobilized personnel to assist in the National Disaster Medical System (NDMS) operations during hurricanes Katrina and Rita in 2005. The team is a working body of clinical and non-clinical volunteers who support healthcare operations in order to maintain healthcare infrastructure during periods of catastrophic need.

Spartanburg Medical Center is also the site of South Carolina's first Joint Commission-accredited Chest Pain and Primary Stroke centers.

=== Spartanburg Hospital for Restorative Care ===
Spartanburg Hospital for Restorative Care is a licensed freestanding 97-bed, long-term acute-care hospital (LTACH) and a licensed 25-bed skilled nursing facility.

=== Pelham Medical Center ===
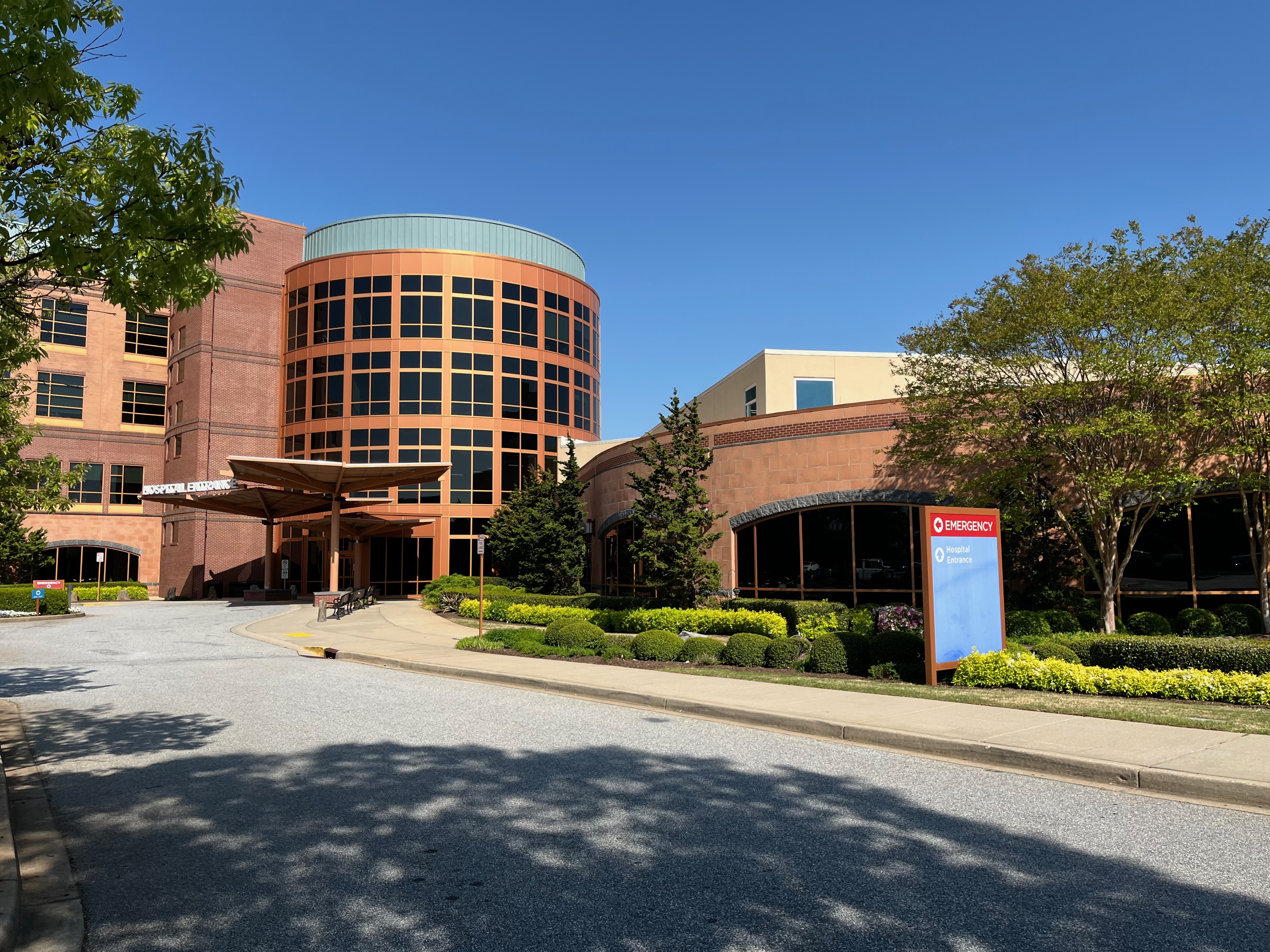
Pelham Medical Center

Pelham Medical Center is located in Greer, South Carolina, and became operational in October 2008. This hospital focuses on medical and surgical patients. Pelham Medical Center is licensed for and operates 48 beds. The facility provides emergency services, general surgery, gynecology, orthopedics, cardiology (non-invasive), endocrinology, gastroenterology, general medicine, oncology, and intensive care services. This campus includes Pelham Medical Center Medical Office Building, the Surgery Center at Pelham, and the Gibbs Cancer Center & Research Institute at Pelham.

=== Cherokee Medical Center ===
Cherokee Medical Center is a 125-bed acute care facility located in Gaffney, SC that services Cherokee County and the surrounding areas. The hospital provides services including emergency, medical, surgical, and imaging services. Formerly Novant Health Gaffney Medical Center, later Gaffney Medical Center, the hospital joined Mary Black Health System in 2015 and became Mary Black Health System — Gaffney. Mary Black facilities became part of Spartanburg Regional Healthcare System in 2019.

=== Union Medical Center ===
Union Medical Center is located in Union, South Carolina and services Union County and the surrounding areas. In February 2025, a new Union Medical Center was built along Furman L. Fendley Highway in Union, centralizing healthcare services under one roof and creating a sustainable model that addresses rural health needs for generations to come. The hospital provides services including emergency care, imaging services, Gibbs Cancer Center infusion services, inpatient care, lab services, Bearden-Josey Center for Breast Health mammography services, outpatient services, pharmacy and primary care.

Formerly Wallace Thomson Hospital, the operations were transferred by lease to the district and are operated as Union Medical Center, a division of the district.

=== Medical Group of the Carolinas ===
Spartanburg Regional Healthcare System operates the Medical Group of the Carolinas, a network of more than 120 practices. The medical group includes family medicine, internal medicine, obstetrics, gynecology, pediatrics, immediate care, emergency medicine, inpatient medicine, allergy and immunology, medical weight loss, cardiology, cardiothoracic and vascular surgery, diabetes and endocrinology, gastroenterology, surgery, gynecologic oncology, infectious disease, maternal-fetal medicine, occupational health, oncology, hematology, orthopedic surgery, palliative care, pediatric critical care, physical medicine and rehabilitation, plastic surgery, psychiatry, radiation oncology, rheumatology, urology, vascular access, and wound care.

The regional outpatient service sites of care offer a wide range of diagnostic, laboratory, and invasive tests and procedures. Outpatient imaging centers are located at Cherokee Medical Center, North Grove Medical Park, Pelham Medical Center Medical Office Building, Pelham Medical Offices at Five Forks, and Spartanburg Medical Center — Mary Black Campus. These centers offer a variety of exams from general radiography, CT, MRI, general and vascular sonography, mammography, nuclear medicine, and bone densitometry using equipment to maximize the diagnostic capabilities of the centers.

=== Gibbs Cancer Center & Research Institute ===
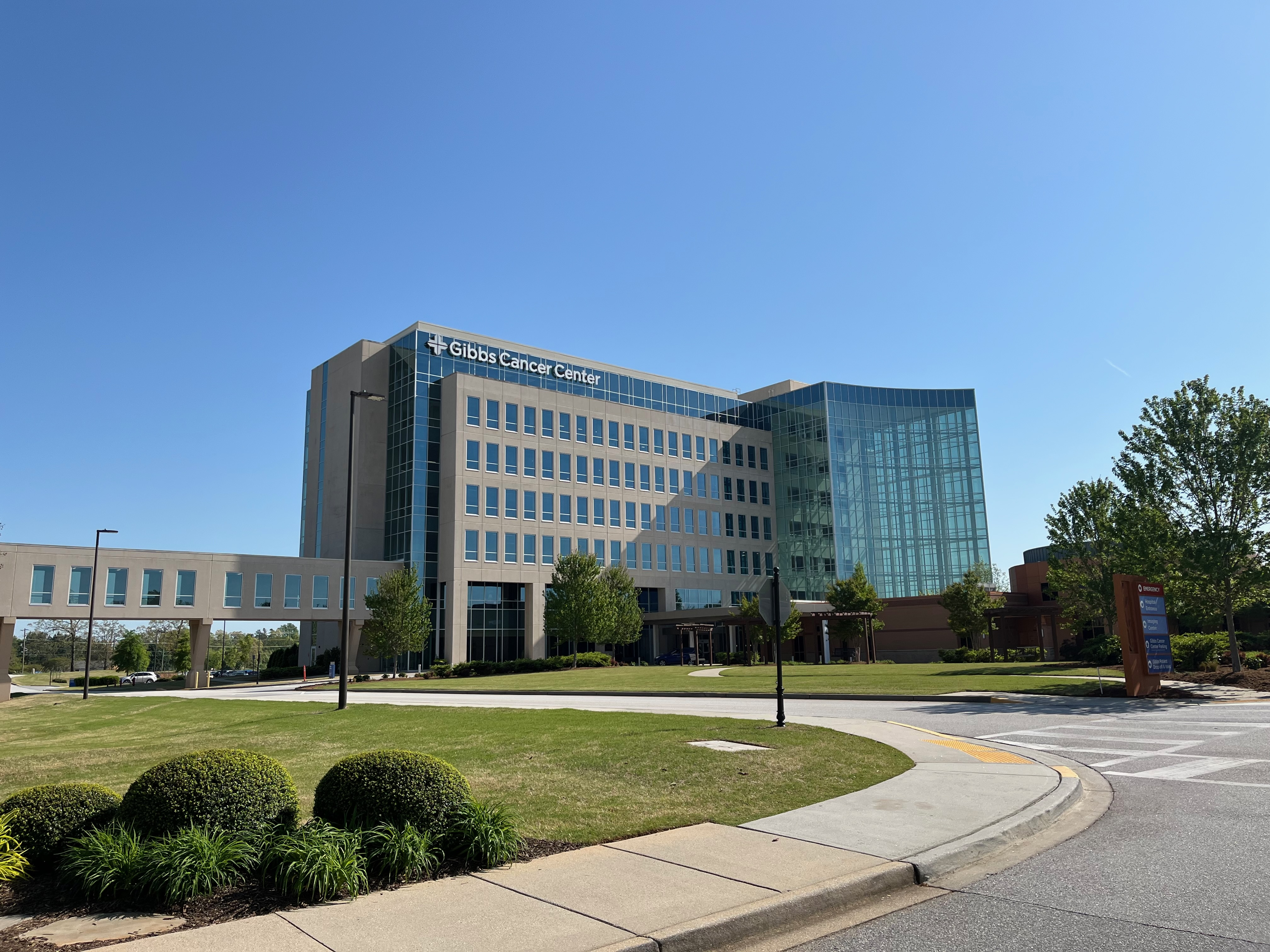
Gibbs Cancer Center at Pelham

Gibbs Cancer Center opened on the SMC campus in 1999. This 98,000-square-foot facility provides comprehensive cancer care to the Upstate community. The inpatient oncology unit located on the SMC campus consists of 30 beds.

In April 2013, Gibbs Cancer Center was renamed Gibbs Cancer Center & Research Institute when a 7,500-square-foot research facility was added to the cancer center.

Since Gibbs Cancer Center & Research Institute has grown locations across the Upstate:

- Gibbs Cancer Center & Research Institute at Pelham
- Gibbs Cancer Center & Research Institute at Gaffney
- Gibbs Cancer Center & Research Institute at Union

Gibbs Cancer Center & Research Institute at Pelham opened in the spring of 2013. Gibbs at Pelham provides radiation oncology and medical oncology services. In 2015, Gibbs at Pelham added the Cyberknife M6 system, which is the first of its kind in the southeastern United States and was the first system in the United States to treat with the MLC apertures. Gibbs was the first place in North or South Carolina, and one of the first cancer centers in the United States, to utilize a new tool for prostate cancer called the SpaceOAR® System. SpaceOAR is the first FDA-approved procedure for placing a ‘spacer’ to protect the rectum of men undergoing prostate cancer radiation. Daniel Fried, MD, PhD, medical director and radiation oncologist at Gibbs Cancer Center & Research Institute - Pelham, was the first trained and certified physician in the Carolinas to use SpaceOAR.

Gibbs at Gaffney was opened in September 2011. Gibbs at Gaffney provides radiation oncology, medical oncology services and infusion services.

Medical oncology services are also provided in Union, South Carolina.

=== Bearden-Josey Center for Breast Health ===
The Bearden-Josey Center for Breast Health is an imaging center that consolidates digital mammography, ultrasound, stereotactic breast biopsy, and bone densitometry into one outpatient location, opened in 2008. The center also provides screening at SMC, PMC, and at eight satellite locations throughout the Upstate:

- Cherokee
- Heywood
- Mary Black
- North Grove
- Pelham
- Spartanburg
- Westside
- Union

The Bearden-Josey Center received full accreditation from the National Accreditation Program for Breast Centers in 2010. The center has also been recognized as a Breast Imaging Center of Excellence by the American College of Radiology. A mobile mammography unit serves as an outreach effort, and it is equipped with digital mammography equipment, two changing rooms and a reception area. The unit serves Spartanburg, Cherokee and Union counties.

=== Ellen Sagar Nursing Center ===
Ellen Sagar Nursing Center in Union, South Carolina, became a division of Spartanburg Regional Healthcare System in 2015. Ellen Sagar is a 113-bed long-term care, skilled nursing facility that offers nursing care and rehabilitation services.

=== Woodruff Manor ===
Woodruff Manor is located in Woodruff, South Carolina, and was acquired by the District on Oct. 1, 2017. WM is licensed for and operates 88 skilled nursing beds.

=== Spartanburg Regional Hospice Home ===
Spartanburg Regional Hospice Home is located in Spartanburg, South Carolina. It is licensed for and operates 15 beds.

=== Spartanburg Regional Foundation ===
Spartanburg Regional Foundation is a charitable corporation whose primary mission is to benefit Spartanburg Regional Healthcare System through direct support and support of community programs and services.

=== Regional HealthPlus ===
Regional HealthPlus (RHP) is a network of physicians, hospitals and other healthcare providers.

Cardiac Services: The Heart Center at SMC has 84 beds, 20 of which are critical care beds. The remaining beds are post-surgical and post-medical coronary care beds, all of which are in private rooms. Cardiac services offered range from diagnostic to intervention and rehabilitation. There are four cardiac catheterization laboratories serving the Heart Center in which over 4,300 diagnostic and interventional catheterizations are performed annually. In addition, more than 450 cardiac surgeries are performed each year in three operating rooms dedicated to cardiac surgery located in the Heart Center. Other services include echocardiography, vascular ultrasound, and diagnostic heart CT scans.

The Heart Center's Cardiac Rehabilitation Program is state certified and aids patients as they recover from a cardiac event. At any particular time, there are more than 700 patients enrolled. The Heart Center houses an active electrophysiology and Congestive Heart Failure program and is a participant in national and international research programs and studies.

Surgical Services: Inpatient surgery and outpatient surgery services are offered at SMC locations and PMC. Outpatient surgery services are also provided through the joint venture entities ASCS and SCP. Currently, surgical services at SMC consist of 15 general operating rooms, one hybrid endovascular vascular suite, two cystoscopy operating rooms, and one minor procedure operating room. The 15 operating rooms range in size from 594 to 816 square feet. Today, larger rooms are required to accommodate new technology used in surgery. SMC also offers a minimally invasive approach to surgery with the da Vinci® robotic surgical systems. SMC's robotic program is one of the most comprehensive in South Carolina, offering robotic gynecological (GYN), GYN oncologic, radical prostate, partial nephrectomy, and thoracic, general, and cardiac procedures. Over 8,700 robotic procedures have been performed since the program started in 2007. There are also three open-heart operating rooms in the Heart Center, contiguous to the main operating rooms and three GYN operating rooms. The pre-op area consists of 26 individual patient rooms, and the Post-Anesthesia Care Unit (PACU) recovery room consists of 27 bays. PACU has two dedicated isolation rooms and two dedicated pediatric rooms. Over 18,300 surgeries were performed at SMC and PMC during the fiscal year 2017.

Emergency Services: Spartanburg Regional Healthcare System offers emergency services at SMC locations, PMC, CMC and UMC. The Emergency Center at SMC on East Wood Street is designated as a Level I Trauma Center (one of only four in South Carolina), certified to begin treatment of any injury 24 hours a day, including massive trauma. The Emergency Center, which opened in its current space in 2004, is one of the busiest emergency departments in the Carolinas. Collectively, Spartanburg Regional's emergency centers see more than 224,000 patients annually.

Women's Services: More than 3,800 babies are born each year at Spartanburg Medical Center campuses. The locations include triage areas, labor and delivery beds, postpartum beds, operating rooms, mother/baby units, and Neonatal Intensive Care Unit (NICU) services.

For women requiring non-maternity-related healthcare services, the Center for Women offers private rooms for women's health needs. In addition, 4-D ultrasound services, and a classroom for seminars and community prepared family programs is available.

Pediatrics: Pediatrics at SMC locations consists of a 12-bed pediatric unit and a four-bed Pediatric Intensive Care Unit (PICU). A pediatric intensivist is available at all times. There is a pediatric surgeon on the faculty of the medical education program. SMC also offers a variety of outpatient pediatric services, including educational programs on parenting issues and children's health and wellness. MGC includes three pediatric physician offices with 15 physicians located conveniently throughout Spartanburg.

Neuro-Sciences: At SMC, neuro-critical care beds are dedicated to the department of neurosurgery. In addition, there is a 28-bed general neurology floor with telemetry capabilities plus a 23-bed telemetry unit for the care of less critical patients. SMC was the first healthcare provider in South Carolina to be named a Primary Stroke Center.

Behavioral Health Services: SMC provides both inpatient and outpatient psychiatry services. The inpatient Psychiatry Unit operates 28 beds and is located on the third floor of the main hospital building. Services include treatment for any type of behavioral, emotional, or mental health illness. Programs specializing in geriatric patients/elderly, adult inpatient/acute care, employee assistance programs, psychiatric home health services, outpatient appointments with psychiatrists and counselors, outpatient therapy and support programs, and nursing home consultation services are provided.

Post-Acute Services: In addition to the post-acute facilities described above, the district provides Home Health, Palliative, and Hospice Care in a variety of settings:

Home Health provides 10,800 episodes of care for residents of Spartanburg, Cherokee, Union, and Greenville counties for individuals who are recovering from illness or surgery, injury, undergoing treatment, disabled, or chronically ill. Services include skilled nursing, physical therapy, occupational therapy, speech therapy, medical social services, aides, wound care, infusion, and enteral services and telehealth.

Hospice services are offered in homes throughout the four-county service area of Spartanburg, Cherokee, Union, and Greenville, providing comfort and support services to patients and their families. This program coordinates the services of physicians, nurses, chaplains, social workers, volunteers and other specialists to care for nearly 11,000 patients a year.

Spartanburg Regional's Palliative Care program offers inpatient consultative services at SMC, PMC, and SHRC, as well as outpatient services to Spartanburg and surrounding counties. Any patient with a real or potentially life-threatening/life-limiting condition may be appropriate for a referral. Inpatient consultations for 2017 have exceeded 1,700, and outpatient visits are well over 1,100. Outpatient services include the Supportive Care Clinic for cancer diagnoses, the Advanced Lung Disease Clinic, Home-based Palliative Care, and the General Palliative Care Clinic for non-cancer diagnoses. Palliative consultations are also offered in some local skilled nursing facilities.

== History ==
=== The Beginning: 1917–1939 ===
Starting with the turn of the twentieth century, the number of hospitals in Spartanburg were beginning to grow. In the late 1910s, at least seven other hospitals served the city.

In 1913, Nina Littlejohn and her husband established the two story, black owned and operated John-Nina Hospital adjacent to their house on North Dean Street. From 1913 to 1932 the licensed hospital provided medical care specifically for African Americans who previously did not have access to proper medical care. The hospital had space for 36 patients consisting of two wards, eight semiprivate rooms, and an operating room. Additionally, the hospital contained a full kitchen where meals were prepared for patients using supplies from Worth Littlejohn's garden.

One of those hospitals was Spartanburg Hospital, Inc., which opened in 1907 thanks in part to the efforts of Dr. Hugh Ratchford Black, known as an early pioneer surgeon in the area who also wrote a definitive history of medicine in the Spartanburg region at the time.

Dr. Black actively campaigned for and supported the opening of a public hospital in Spartanburg.

On July 21, 1919, ground was broken for Spartanburg General Hospital, and a newspaper article promised the public that they could look forward to one of the “best arranged and equipped hospitals in the entire South.”

Dr. Black's Spartanburg Hospital was one of five hospitals that were sold in 1920–1921; the proceeds were used to finance Spartanburg General Hospital.

When Spartanburg General Hospital opened on Aug. 29, 1921, people arrived by motorcars, horse-drawn buggies, wagons, and trolleys to celebrate the opening.

Dr. Black performed the first surgery there – on his son, Paul Black.

Later, Dr. Hugh R. Black and his sons, Drs. Samuel Orr Black and Hugh Snoddy Black, would open another hospital in at 1925 East Main Street, Spartanburg. That hospital was named for the family matriarch Mary Black.

The original Mary Black hospital resided at 1925 East Main Street.

Spartanburg General's early years were devoted to establishing key services. The Spartanburg General Hospital School of Nursing graduated its first class in 1922. Student nurses and SGH nursing graduates would play important roles in providing patient care for many years. The medical laboratory, the dietary department, a volunteer dental clinic, and a social services department were also established in these first few years.

The 1929 stock market crash resulted in the closure of more than 700 hospitals across the country between 1928 and 1938, but Spartanburg General remained open.

Patients worked out their hospital expenses in creative ways. Farmers brought chickens, fruit and vegetables as payment on accounts, and their produce and livestock was used to feed the patients. Flour and sugar sacks were turned into aprons and towels. Staff in the dietary department made soap.

In 1932, Spartanburg General Hospital took over the John-Nina Hospital, but Littlejohn's influence remained. A special section in the hospital was preserved for African Americans.

In spite of the Great Depression, Spartanburg General continued to add services. In 1933, W.C. Guy, the hospital electrician, helped improvise an electrically heated incubator for premature babies, and the hospital assigned two nurses and a room in which newborns could be isolated, creating the forerunner to today's neonatal intensive care unit (NICU).

In 1934, Spartanburg General opened the first local cancer clinic. It was one of the oldest American College of Surgeons (ACOS) Commission on Cancer-approved cancer programs in the nation.

By 1938, the hospital treated 198 patients a day, up from the 1926 daily average of 54 patients.

=== Mid-20th Century: 1940s–1960s ===
In the 1940s, a wing added to the south end of the hospital contained 63 private rooms, a new surgical suite, and other modern facilities. The School of Nursing added a new library and laboratories. From 1943 to 1946, the Spartanburg General Hospital School of Nursing was affiliated with the United States Cadet Nurse Corps. Nurses in training could transfer to an Army, Navy or Veterans’ hospital during their last six months of training.

With World War II raging, more than 30 local physicians left Spartanburg to serve in the war.

After the war, expansion continued to accommodate the postwar baby boom. Additional expansions in the 1950s and 1960s added a pediatric floor, a new delivery suite, a larger emergency room, additional operating rooms, and intensive and coronary care units. Bed capacity was now 459.

The 1960 expansion offered patients new comforts including private or semi-private rooms with private bathrooms. Bedside telephones and a nurse call system were installed, and the bed crank of the 1920s gave way to an electrical bed operated at the touch of a button. Color televisions replaced the coin-operated radios once mounted on the bed for the entertainment of the patient.

That same year, the ‘Gray Ladies’ began their service of guiding patients to their rooms from the admitting office. This was the inception of the volunteer services department.

By the mid-1960s, the hospital had more than 1,000 staff members, and the patient population was about to change exponentially. In July 1966, the hospital was approved for Medicare patients. This brought a multitude of new rules and regulations and a pressing need for trained staff and new beds.

At the same time, hospital-based nurse training programs were being phased out all over the nation and replaced by college and university training. In February 1967, hospital officials signed an agreement with University of South Carolina (USC) trustees to establish USC-Spartanburg (now known as USC-Upstate) complete with a nursing school.

After 48 years of educating nurses, the Spartanburg General Hospital School of Nursing graduated its final class in 1969. The school brought more than 1,000 graduate nurses into the profession.

=== Late-20th Century: 1970s–1990s ===
In 1968, Spartanburg General added a new data center to handle a modern phenomenon: a tsunami of information. Computers had come to the General, and they had come to stay.

Also in 1968, due to growing services, Mary Black Memorial Hospital moved from East Main Street to its current location on Skylyn Drive.

A technological revolution was also at play in medicine. New treatments for cancer and coronary disease called for new laboratories and the latest equipment. A newborn nursery suite opened in 1968 and obtained a nursery for well babies and an intensive care nursery with equipment to monitor heart rate and respiration as well as a transport isolette with its own battery power so that newborns could be safely transported between hospitals.

In 1976, SGH technicians began using ultrasound equipment to monitor pregnancies. An endoscopy department opened, and in 1977, the hospital obtained a $550,000 EMI scanner, the first full-body CT scanner in South Carolina.

Throughout the 1970s and 1980s, Spartanburg General expanded its commitment to educating medical professionals. The Department of Medical Education was established in 1970, making Spartanburg General the first hospital in South Carolina approved by the American Board of Family Practice for Family Practice residencies and the fifth chartered Family Medicine program in the nation.

In 1981, Spartanburg General's Pharmacy Residency Program earned accreditation from the American Society of Hospital Pharmacists, which allowed post-graduates a year-long experience in different specialties to prepare them for supervisory positions in other hospital pharmacies.

Technological improvements and a growing staff of medical residents called for more space. In 1972, Gov. John C. West presided over the groundbreaking ceremony for the $3.5 million ambulatory care, education and administration building. The building offered a modern outpatient service unit and an emergency department equal to the task of serving 40,000 patients a year.

The 1980s heralded a new direction for Spartanburg General Hospital as it moved from a community institution to a regional tertiary care hospital.

The hospital added a Home Health program and a Hospice program to provide end of life care and support for patients and their families. In 1984, Spartanburg General's In-Patient Hospice Unit – the first in the two Carolinas – opened its doors.

Cardiac care was also advancing. The hospital established a cardiac rehabilitation program to treat patients with heart conditions. Surgeons performed Spartanburg General Hospital's first open-heart surgery in 1981.

The hospital opened a new Sleep Disorders Center—one of the first programs of its kind in the Southeast.

Spartanburg General was also at the forefront of cancer research. In 1983, a $150,000 National Cancer Institute (NCI) grant enabled the hospital and its staff to participate in the National Community Clinical Oncology Program (CCOP), the first of many cancer research projects at the hospital.

During the hospital's celebration of its 65th birthday in 1986, the decision was made to change the institution's name from Spartanburg General Hospital to Spartanburg Regional Medical Center (SRMC).

The 95-bed Regional Heart Center opened in 1988. It was the first in the Carolinas to consolidate the prevention, diagnosis, treatment, and rehabilitation of heart diseases under one roof.

The new Heart Center brought the total number of beds at SRMC to 588.

In 1988, medical advancements included Hyperbaric Oxygen Therapy and Magnetic Resonance Imaging (MRI).

In 1994, SRMC purchased the building and equipment of Doctors Memorial Hospital on Serpentine Drive. Renamed the Spartanburg Hospital for Restorative Care (SHRC), the hospital serves acutely ill patients who need care longer than is provided in a traditional hospital setting.

The eight-story Rose and Walter Montgomery Patient Tower opened in 1996. Designed to meet new demands for patient comfort and family involvement, the Tower also brought services physically closer to one another to make the operation of the hospital more efficient.

In 1996, the Regional Outpatient Center (ROC) opened. Built on the grounds of the former Nurses’ Residence, the building consolidated all outpatient services.

SRMC also consolidated its women's services areas at the hospital by opening the Regional Center for Women in 1996.

The Rx Robot entered the scene in 1997, continuing the hospital's role as an important innovator in health care. The robot minimized medication errors and ensured that expired medications were disposed of immediately.

=== 21st Century: 2000–present ===
A new era in Spartanburg Regional's history began in 1999 with the opening of the Gibbs Cancer Center. It included the area's only radiation oncology center. The Inpatient Oncology and Hospice unit at the Gibbs Cancer Center includes 30 oncology and hospice rooms.

While directors and physicians had been planning the facility for several years, a $1.2 million gift from the Marsha and Jimmy Gibbs family accelerated its construction. The gift was a catalyst for community donations totaling more than $3 million, including $165,000 in donations from employees Gibbs Cancer Center was one of the first facilities to offer all cancer services under one roof. Now known as the Gibbs Cancer Center and Research Institute, SRHS is investing in physicians, technology, facilities, and research to create the cancer center of the future.

In 2007, SRHS broke ground on the Bearden-Josey Breast Health Center, which opened in 2008. Six satellite locations of the center are now open.

From 2011 to 2013, SRHS expanded its cancer care service area by opening two satellite facilities: Gibbs Regional Cancer Center at Gaffney and Gibbs Regional Cancer Center at Pelham. SRHS also joined forces with Bon Secours St. Francis Health System to expand services and research.

Innovative technology investments during this era included Gibbs being the first hospital in the state to offer TomoTherapy, a target form of radiation therapy. In addition, Gibbs Pelham was the first hospital in the Upstate to use the CyberKnife Robotic Radiosurgery System, a surgery-free radiation therapy. Also in 2015, Gibbs became the first cancer center in the Carolinas and one of the first cancer centers in the United States to use a new technology called the SpaceOAR System for prostate cancer radiation therapy.

In 2002, the Regional Surgery Center relocated its 7 operating suites from Spartanburg Hospital for Restorative Care to a freestanding Ambulatory Surgery Center.

SRHS also established the first hospital-based air ambulance service in the Upstate with Regional One.

In 2004, the Surgery Center at Pelham opened as a joint venture between local surgeons and SRHS. This was followed by the Village at Pelham Medical Office Building in 2006. In 2008, the 48-bed Village Hospital opened as a fully operational acute-care facility. This facility became known as the Pelham Medical Center in 2014.

A new Emergency Center (EC) opened in 2004 with 55 beds, double the size of its predecessor. The EC became one of the busiest in the Carolinas, with almost 100,000 visits annually.

In 2006, the $5.3 million Regional Hospice Home opened. It is the only hospital-based hospice home in the Upstate.

Operating room innovations were key in 2008, when surgeons began operating in the first surgical suite in the United States that utilized the modular VARIOP system that allows operating room walls to be reconfigured to meet the needs of a particular surgical team.

Also in 2008, Spartanburg Regional became the first hospital in the South to perform robotic endoscopic beating-heart surgery. SRHS also established the most comprehensive and experienced da Vinci® Robotic Surgical program in the state.

In 2010, Spartanburg Regional became the first hospital in South Carolina to complete a minimally invasive, robotic-assisted lung surgery for early lung cancer.

Spartanburg Regional was also at the forefront in surgical innovations such as 3D printing for knee replacements and in being named a Blue Distinction Center in hip replacement surgery by BlueCross BlueShield of South Carolina.

In 2016, Beaumont Mill filled with people for the first time in nearly 20 years. After a year of renovations, Spartanburg Regional Healthcare System relocated 600 administrative and support services to the former textile mill, freeing up space at Spartanburg Medical Center for additional patient services.

In 2019, the histories of Spartanburg Regional Healthcare System and the Mary Black Hospital became intertwined again. Spartanburg Regional acquired Mary Black Health System, including hospitals in Spartanburg and Gaffney, multiple physician practices and nearly 1,400 associates, became part of Spartanburg Regional. The purchase from subsidiaries of Tennessee-based Community Health Systems allowed Spartanburg Regional Healthcare System to serve even more patients in Spartanburg and Cherokee counties.
