= Greenville Memorial Hospital =

Hospital and academic centre in South Carolina

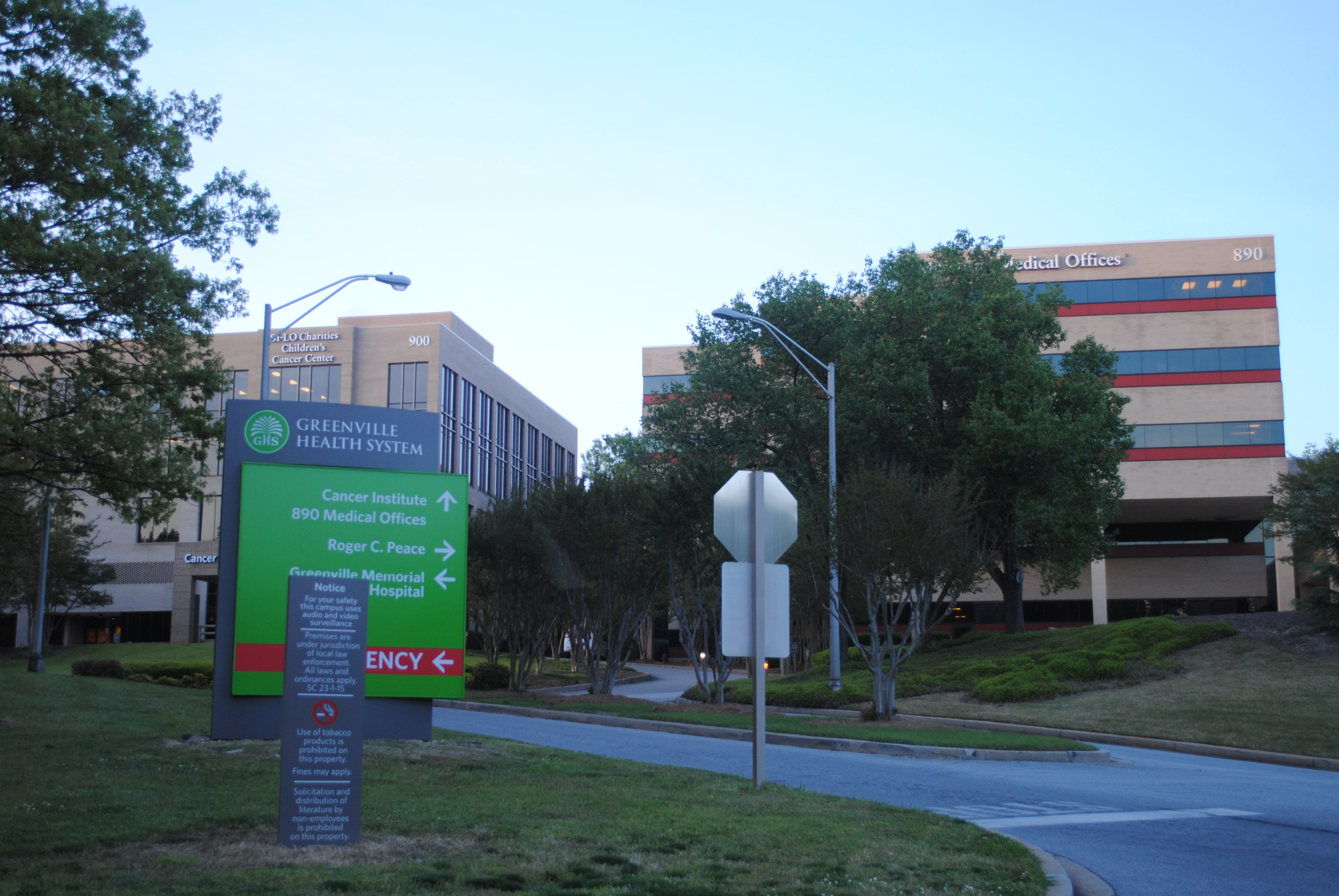

Geography
- Location: 701 Grove Road, Greenville, South Carolina, United States
- Coordinates: 34°49′6″N 82°24′42″W

Organization
- Care system: Public
- Type: General, teaching, research
- Affiliated university: University of South Carolina School of Medicine Greenville

Services
- Emergency department: Level I Adult Trauma Center / Level II Pediatric Trauma Center
- Beds: 814

Links
- Website: https://prismahealth.org/locations/hospitals/greenville-memorial-hospital
- Lists: Hospitals in South Carolina

Greenville Memorial Hospital is an 814-bed tertiary referral hospital and academic center located at 701 Grove Road, Greenville, South Carolina. It serves as the regional referral center for the upstate area.

It was formerly the flagship hospital for the Greenville Health System, which is now part of Prisma Health, a not-for-profit academic health organization engaged in medical research and education. The Greenville Memorial campus also hosts the University of South Carolina School of Medicine's Greenville Campus, as well as the Marshall I. Pickens Psychiatric Hospital. The facility also houses Prisma's headquarters.

The Greenville Health Authority (GHA) owns the hospital, and leases it to Prisma. The GHA is the portion of the Greenville Health System that still existed after the hospital transitioned into being operated by Prisma.

== Notable doctors ==
- Kyle Altman
