= Palmetto Middle School =

Palmetto Middle School may refer to:

- Palmetto Middle School in Pinecrest, Florida
- Palmetto Middle School in Mullins, South Carolina
- Palmetto Middle School in Williamston, South Carolina
