= Palmetto High School =

Palmetto High School may refer to:

- Miami Palmetto Senior High School in Pinecrest, Florida
- Palmetto High School (Florida) in Palmetto, Florida
- Palmetto High School in Mullins, South Carolina that was integrated into Mullins High School
- Palmetto High School (South Carolina) in Williamston, South Carolina
