= Sabal 'Birmingham' =

Palm cultivar

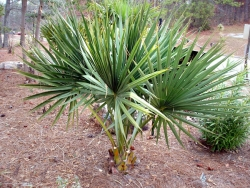
- Hybrid parentage: Sabal hybrid S. palmetto × S. minor
- Cultivar: Birmingham

Sabal 'Birmingham' is a seed-propagated selection of palmetto (Arecaceae, genus Sabal), of unknown origin and widely thought to be a hybrid of Sabal palmetto with a yet-unidentified species. It is widely known for its extreme cold hardiness and its slow growth compared to other palmetto species.

== History ==
The origin of Sabal 'Birmingham' is shrouded in mystery. The plant was first identified with a large palmetto that grew in the garden of Eva Alexander in Birmingham, Alabama (hence the name), which survived many freezes below 10 °F (−12 °C), including at least one below 0 °F (−18 °C). One even survived -11 degrees F in Tulsa, OK. Speculation indicates the seed source for this particular palm was somewhere in California. After Alexander's death in 1976, her property on Graymont Avenue was re-purposed for a church, and the tree was moved to the Birmingham Botanical Gardens. It remained there until it died in the mid 1980s. Before its demise, Bob McCartney of Woodlander's Nursery collected seed from the tree and began germinating seedlings, which have kept this particular species going. Specimens are now found as far away as Virginia, Maryland, and southern New Jersey.

== Description ==
Sabal 'Birmingham' grows up to 40 ft (12 m) in height, with a trunk up to 2 ft (61 cm) diameter. Like Sabal palmetto, it is a distinct fan palm (Arecaceae tribe Corypheae), with a bare petiole which extends as a center spine or midrib, (costa) 1/2 to 2/3 the length into a rounded, costapalmate fan of numerous leaflets. A costapalmate leaf has a definite costa (midrib) unlike the typical palmate or fan leaf, but the leaflets are arranged radially like in a palmate leaf. All costapalmate leaves are markedly recurved or arched backwards. Each leaf is 5 to 6.5 ft (1.5 to 2.0 m) long, with 40-60 leaflets up to 2.6 ft (79 cm) long. It was originally speculated that Sabal birmingham was a hybrid between Sabal palmetto and Sabal mexicana, however its slow growth rate and increased cold hardiness point more toward a hybrid between Sabal palmetto and Sabal minor, both of which are native to Alabama.

== Cultivation and uses ==
This palm is in great demand in areas where Sabal palmetto is only marginally hardy because of its lower protection needs. Well-established specimens of Sabal 'Birmingham' are hardy in USDA Zone 7, while Sabal palmetto needs winter protection and near-perfect siting to be successfully grown in any zone colder than Zone 8. Established Sabal 'Birmingham' are grown in or near Atlanta, GA, Raleigh, NC, New Bern, NC, Nashville, TN, Richmond, VA, Washington, DC, Baltimore, MD and Toms River, NJ

== See also ==
- List of hardy palms
