= Palmetto State e-Cademy =

Virtual school in South Carolina, U.S.

Information
- Established: 2008
- Closed: 2014
- School district: South Carolina Public Charter School District
- NCES District ID: 4503901
- Grades: 9-12

Palmetto State E-cademy was a full-time virtual public charter school in the South Carolina Public Charter School District. It served students throughout the state in grades 9–12 from 2008 until 2014. The office of Palmetto State E-cademy was located in Columbia, South Carolina. In the 2010–11 school year, enrollment was 429 students.
