= Newberry County Memorial Hospital =

- U.S. National Register of Historic Places
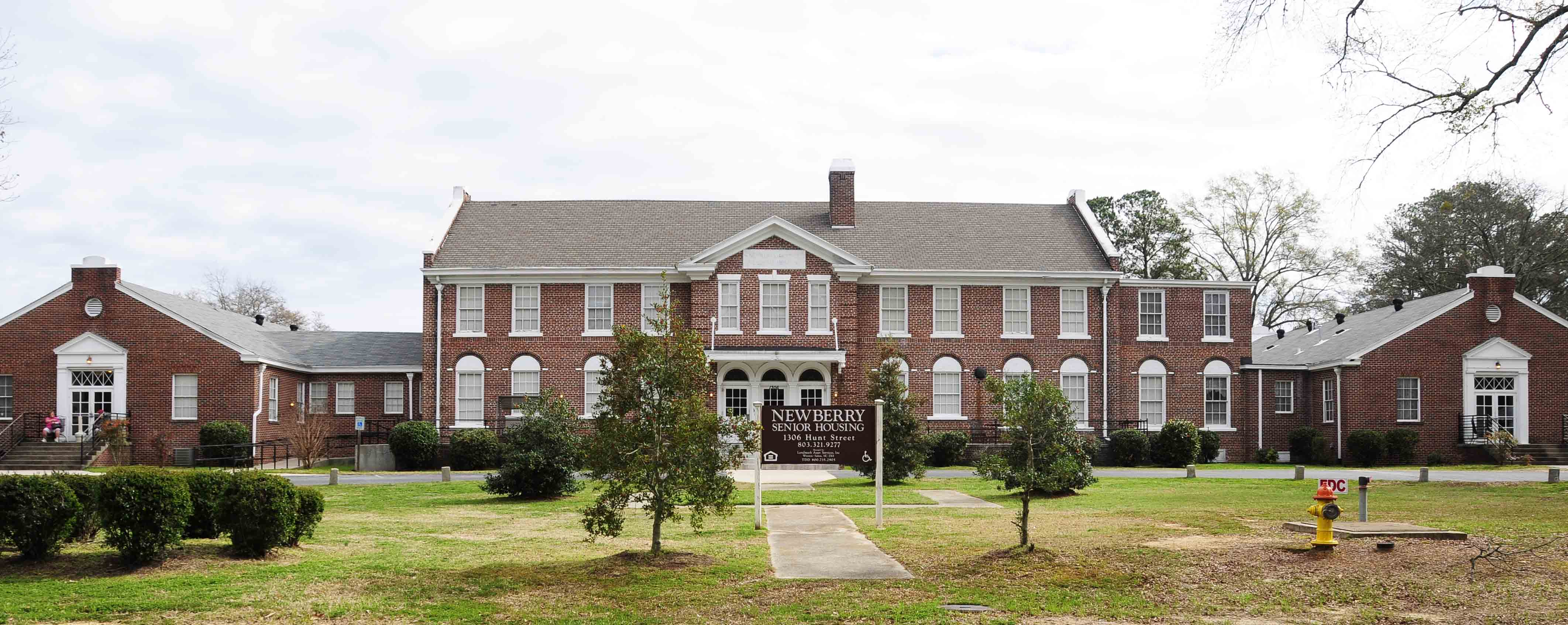
- Newberry County Memorial County Hospital, March 2012

- Location within South Carolina Location within the United States
- Location: 1300-1308 Hunt St., Newberry, South Carolina
- Coordinates: 34°17′2″N 81°36′23″W
- Area: 3 acres (1.2 ha)
- Built: 1924-1925, 1949
- Architect: Hemphill, James Calvin; Livingstone, W.T.
- Architectural style: Colonial Revival
- NRHP reference No.: 04000355
- Added to NRHP: April 21, 2004

Newberry County Memorial Hospital is a historic hospital building located at Newberry, Newberry County, South Carolina. Newberry County Hospital was built in 1924–1925, and is a two-story, Colonial Revival style brick building. Upon opening, the hospital's capacity was 25 beds. It was dedicated on December 22, 1925. Additions were made to the original building about 1949. Also on the site are the former Nurse's Home (c. 1937, c. 1949), the Laundry/Boiler Plant (c. 1925, c. 1949) and storage buildings dating to the 1950s. On May 30, 1950, the hospital's name was changed to Newberry County Memorial Hospital to honor the men and women who served in World War II. In January 1952, the People's Hospital merged with NCMH. In 1963, the north wing was added, increasing the capacity to 72 beds. The hospital moved to a new facility at 2669 Kinard Street in May 1976 with a capacity of 102 beds.

It was listed on the National Register of Historic Places in 2004. The building is currently used as Newberry Senior Housing.
