= Prisma Health =

Non-profit health organization

Prisma Health logo

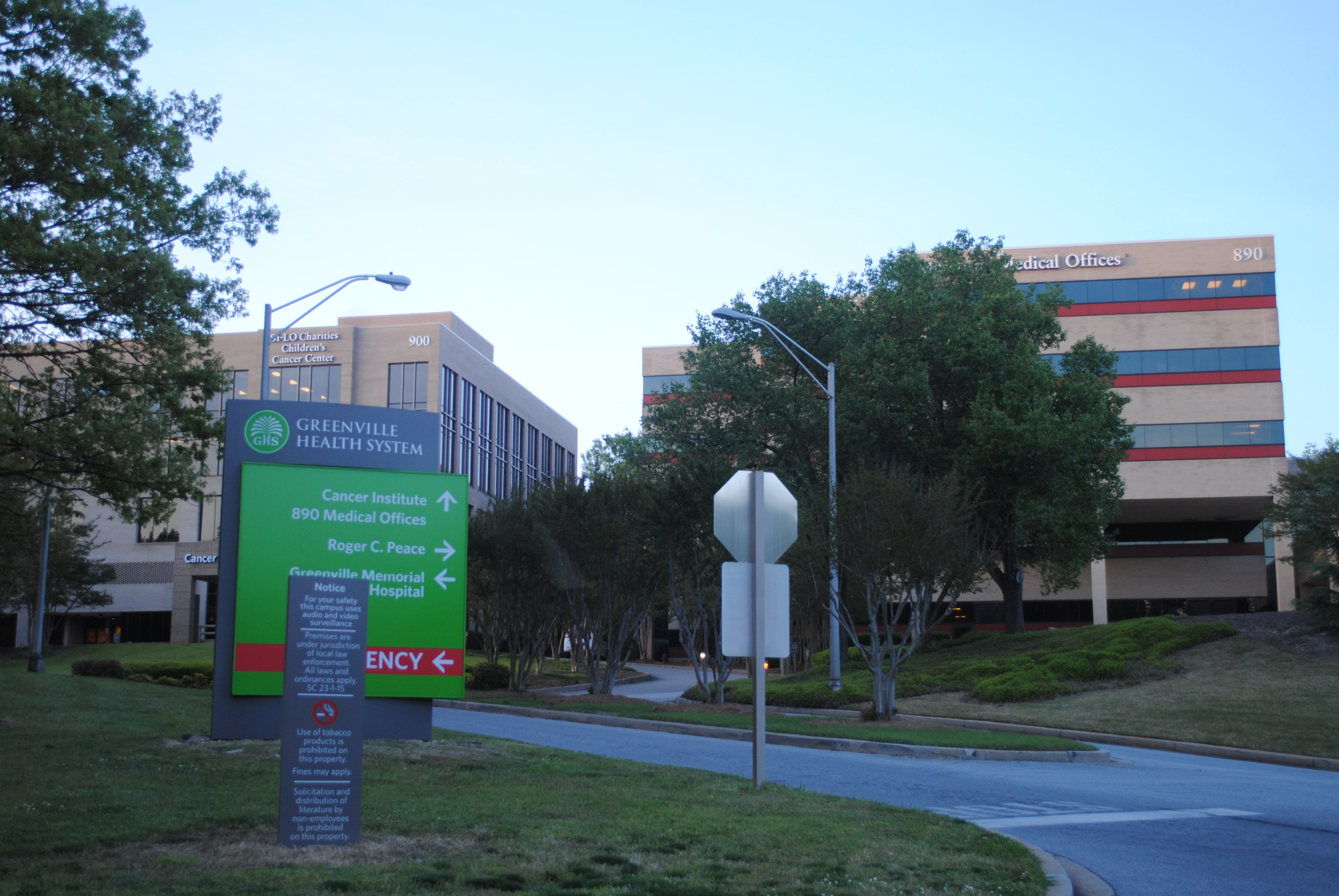
Greenville Memorial Hospital houses the organization's headquarters.

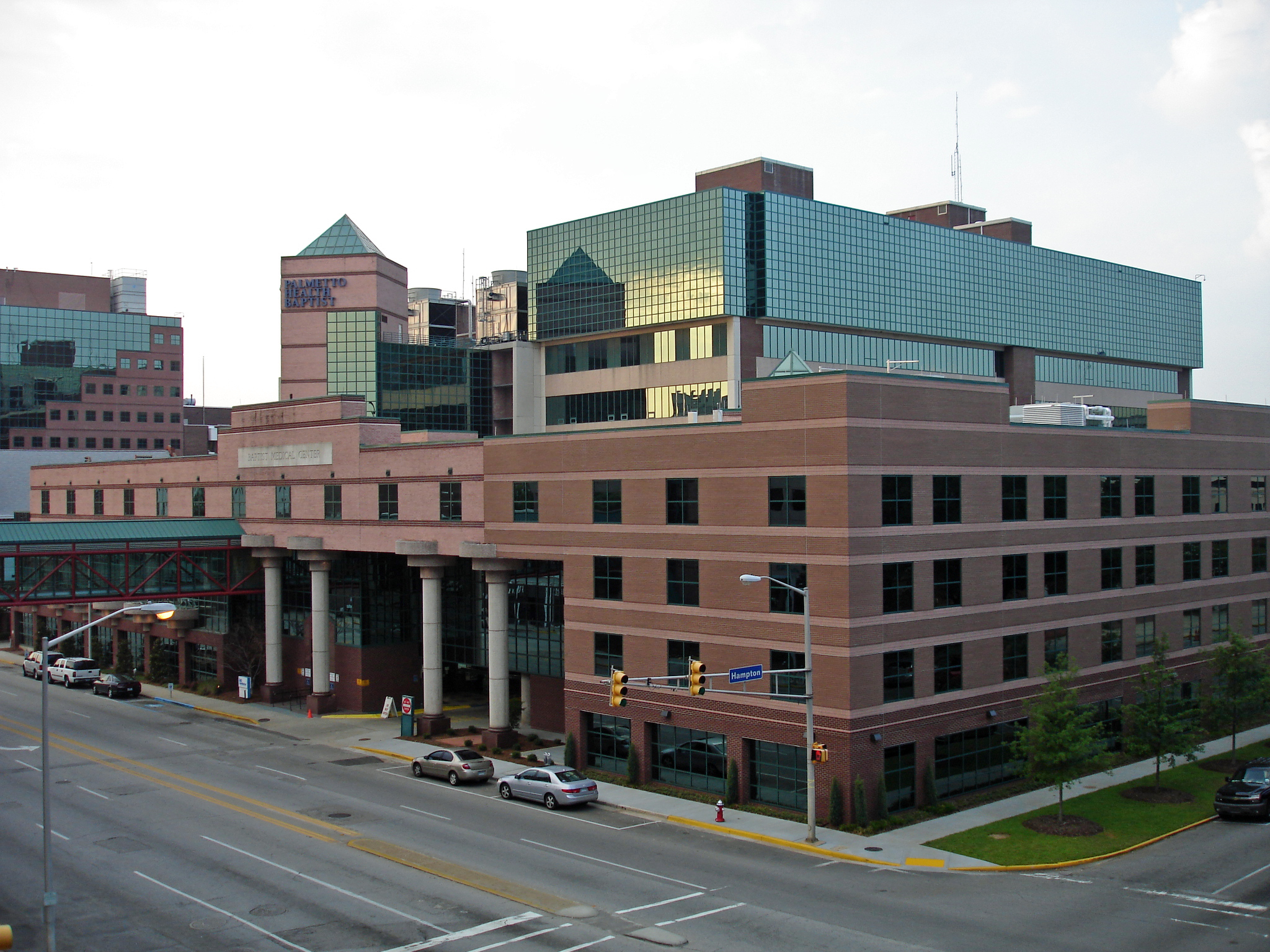
Prisma Health Baptist

Prisma Health is a not-for-profit health organization in South Carolina and Tennessee, formed by the merging of Palmetto Health and the Greenville Health System in November 2017. Its headquarters are in Greenville, South Carolina.

In 2024, Prisma Health announced a merger with Tennessee-based Blount Memorial Hospital, marking the first time Prisma Health has extended access to its services outside of South Carolina.

== History ==
The Greenville Health Authority (GHA) owns healthcare facilities managed by Prisma Health, which leases and operates them as Prisma Health-Upstate (a lease with Upstate Affiliate Organization was made in 2016). Greenville based members of the South Carolina General Assembly stated in 2021 that they wished for GHA to directly supervise and manage the Prisma-run facilities, as well as to make it clear that the GHA and not Prisma has authority over the doctors. However, Act 432 under which GHA operates gives no such authority to the GHA Board of Trustees. The GHA Board only has the authority to assess the compliance of Prisma Health-Upstate with the terms of the Lease. Operations of Prisma Health - Upstate, including the supervision of its employees and physicians, are the responsibility of the Management and Board of Prisma Health.

=== Medicare Fraud ===
In 2013, the U.S. Department of Justice won a $237 million judgement against the Tuomey Healthcare system, then an independent organization, for violations of the Stark Law and the False Claims Act. The decade-long lawsuit was triggered by a whistleblower complaint by Michael Drakeford, MD under the qui tam provision of the Act. Drakeford was among 19 surgeons involved in the billing of illegal referral fees to Medicare. The size of the judgement crushed Tuomey, which subsequently sought to merge with other organizations and it later merged with Palmetto in 2016.

== Hospitals ==
- Prisma Health Baptist Easley Hospital (Located in Easley, South Carolina)
- Prisma Health Greenville Memorial Hospital (Located in Greenville, South Carolina)
- Prisma Health Greer Memorial Hospital (Located in Greer, South Carolina)
- Prisma Health Laurens Memorial Hospital (Located in Laurens County, South Carolina)
- Prisma Health North Greenville Hospital (Located in Travelers Rest, South Carolina)
- Prisma Health Oconee Memorial Hospital (Located in Seneca, South Carolina)
- Prisma Health Patewood Hospital (Located in Greenville, South Carolina)
- Prisma Health Hillcrest Hospital (Located in Simpsonville, South Carolina)
- Prisma Health Richland Hospital (Located north of Downtown Columbia, South Carolina)
- Prisma Health Baptist Hospital (Located in Downtown Columbia, South Carolina)
- Prisma Health Baptist Parkridge Hospital (Located in Irmo, South Carolina)
- Prisma Health Tuomey Hospital (Located in Sumter, South Carolina)
- Prisma Health Blount Memorial Hospital (Located in Maryville, Tennessee)

=== Specialty Hospitals ===
The Specialty Hospitals operated by Prisma Health include:

- Prisma Health Children's Hospital - Midlands (Children's Hospital located on the Richland campus in Columbia)
- Prisma Health Children's Hospital - Upstate
- Prisma Health Heart Hospital (Cardiac-Care Facility located on Richland campus)
- Prisma Health Richland Springs Hospital (psychiatric and addiction services)
- Prisma Health Marshall I. Pickens Hospital (care for psychiatric, emotional, and psychological disorders)

=== Attempted Acquisition ===
In March of 2020, Prisma Health and LifePoint Health announced they had signed an agreement for Prisma Health–Midlands to acquire KershawHealth in Camden, South Carolina and Providence Health in Columbia, South Carolina.

A part of LifePoint Health, KershawHealth consists of facilities in Camden, Elgin, Lugoff, and Kershaw, including a 119-bed Medical Center and a 20-bed Geriatric Psychiatric Unit in Camden, Outpatient Center and Urgent Care in Elgin, Sleep Diagnostics Center, and a Physical Therapy Unit.

Providence Health consists of two hospitals in Columbia, a freestanding Emergency Room in Fairfield County and multiple physician practices, rehabilitation centers, sleep centers, imaging and diagnostics labs, and other services. Providence Health's downtown Columbia hospital specializes in high acuity care, while its Northeast Columbia campus recently transitioned from a specialty facility to a full-service community hospital.

The acquisition was dropped due to significant delays and challenges by the Federal Trade Commission and state regulatory authorities. The hospitals were then acquired by the Medical University of South Carolina.
