= Prisma Health Richland Hospital =

- Prisma Health
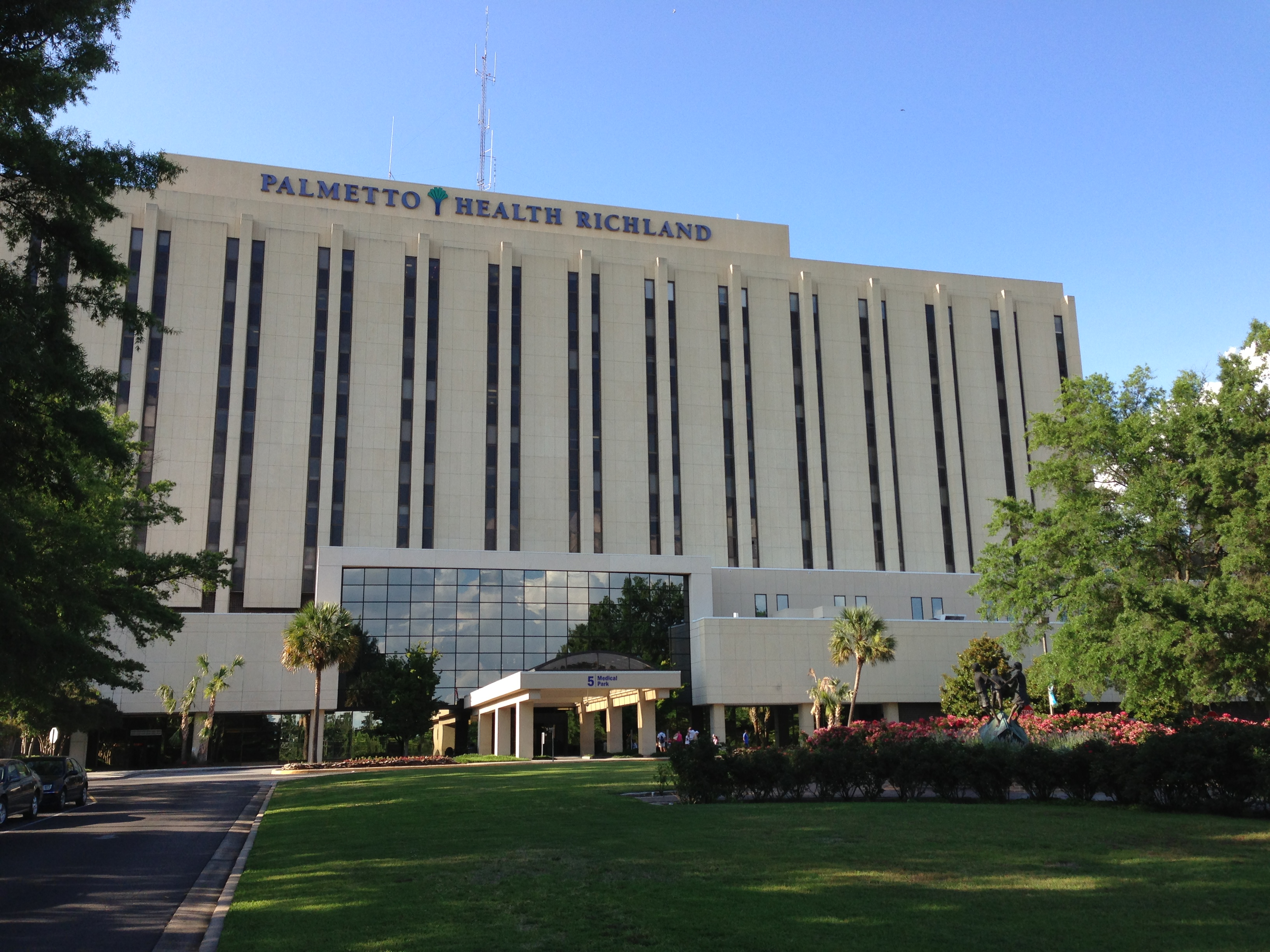

Geography
- Location: Columbia,, South Carolina, United States
- Coordinates: 34.0281°N 81.0329°W

Organization
- Care system: Non-profit
- Type: General and Teaching Hospital
- Affiliated university: University of South Carolina

Services
- Emergency department: Level I Adult Trauma Center / Level II Pediatric Trauma Center
- Beds: 649 Licensed Beds

History
- Founded: 1892 as Columbia Hospital; 1972 as Richland Memorial Hospital; 1998 as Palmetto Health Richland; 2017 as Prisma Health Richland

Links
- Website: https://prismahealth.org/locations/hospitals/richland-hospital
- Lists: Hospitals in South Carolina

Prisma Health Richland Hospital is a tertiary referral hospital and academic center located at 5 Richland Park Medical Dr, Columbia, South Carolina. It serves as the sole regional referral center for the Midlands area.

Prisma Health Richland Hospital was originally established in 1892 as Columbia Hospital and was one of the first hospitals in the city. Over the years, with the growth of Columbia and the arrival of Fort Jackson, the hospital expanded. It outgrew its original location on Harden St. by the 1960s. Later renamed Richland Memorial Hospital, it moved in 1972 to its present location near the intersection of Bull St. and Harden St. Extension.

Today, Prisma Health Richland Hospital is one of the largest hospitals in the state, with 641 beds, a Level I Trauma Center, Comprehensive Stroke Center and over 20 specialties. It is affiliated with the University of South Carolina, training future doctors, nurses and pharmacists. It is the regional referral center for the Midlands of South Carolina and is the site of the Carolinas' first Gamma Knife Center. The hospital also has a total joint center for hip and knee replacements, an associated cardiovascular care hospital and a freestanding children's hospital.

== Prisma Health Heart Hospital ==
In January 2006, the 124 inpatient bed Prisma Health Heart Hospital, located on the Richland campus, opened its doors. The $80 million, 200,000-square-foot (19,000 m^{2}) hospital is the state's only freestanding facility specializing only in the prevention, diagnosis, and treatment of cardiovascular diseases.
