= Flora of Cuba =

Plants native to Cuba

This is a list of vascular plants which includes trees and other herbs, vines, climbers, lianas, shrubs, subshrubs that are native or endemic to Cuba. It excludes plants introduced by humans, including invasive species.

The list includes Cuban native plants identified by Plants of the World Online, unless otherwise noted. This list is sorted in alphabetical order by plant family and then by binomial name. Endemic genera or species (native only to Cuba) are marked by *. Species believed extinct are indicated with †. Common names and native ranges are noted for some species.

== Acanthaceae ==
- Ancistranthus* Lindau
  - Ancistranthus harpochiloides* (Griseb.) Lindau
- Asystasia noliae* R.J.A.Puente
- Avicennia germinans (L.) L.
- Barleriola saturejoides* (Griseb.) M.Gómez
- Barleriola solanifolia (L.) Oerst. ex Lindau
- Bravaisia berlandieriana (Nees) T.F.Daniel
- Dasytropis* Urb.
  - Dasytropis fragilis* Urb. – eastern Cuba (Sierra de Nipe)
- Dianthera comata L.
- Dianthera ovata Walter
- Dianthera peploides* Griseb.
- Dianthera reptans (Sw.) J.F.Gmel.
- Dianthera rugeliana* Griseb.
- Dianthera sagrana* (A.Rich.) Griseb.
- Dicliptera sexangularis (L.) Juss.
- Dyschoriste bayatensis* (Urb.) Urb.
- Dyschoriste cubensis* Urb.
- Dyschoriste humistrata (Michx.) Kuntze
- Dyschoriste parvula* (Alain & Leonard) Greuter & R.Rankin
- Elytraria bissei* H.Dietr.
- Elytraria cubana* Alain
- Elytraria filicaulis* Borhidi & O.Muñiz
- Elytraria planifolia* Leonard
- Elytraria serpens* Greuter & R.Rankin – central Cuba
- Elytraria shaferi* (P.Wilson) Leonard
- Elytraria spathulifolia* Borhidi & O.Muñiz
- Hygrophila costata Nees
- Hygrophila urquiolae* Greuter, R.Rankin & Palmarola
- Justicia agria* Alain & Leonard
- Justicia alainii* Stearn
- Justicia cubana* Alain
- Justicia diversifolia* Jenn. – I. de la Juventud
- Justicia mirabiloides Lam.
- Justicia periplocifolia Jacq.
- Justicia roigii* Britton ex Alain
- Justicia stearnii* V.A.W.Graham
- Justicia stenophylla* Urb. & Britton
- Justicia tomentosula* (Urb.) Stearn
- Lepidagathis alopecuroidea (Vahl) R.Br. ex Griseb.
- Odontonema lindavii* (Urb.) Acev.-Rodr.
- Odontonema nitidum (Jacq.) Kuntze
- Odontonema rubrum (Vahl) Kuntze
- Oplonia acunae* Borhidi
- Oplonia cubensis* Borhidi
- Oplonia moana* Borhidi
- Oplonia multigemma* Borhidi
- Oplonia nannophylla* (Urb.) Stearn
- Oplonia polyece* (Stearn) Borhidi
- Oplonia purpurascens* (Griseb.) Stearn
- Oplonia spinosa (Jacq.) Raf.
- Oplonia tetrasticha* (C.Wright ex Griseb.) Stearn
- Pachystachys spicata (Ruiz & Pav.) Wassh.
- Ruellia blechioides Sw.
- Ruellia blechum L.
- Ruellia ciliatiflora Hook.
- Ruellia domingensis (Nees) Lindau
- Ruellia geminiflora Kunth
- Ruellia macrophylla Vahl
- Ruellia paniculata L.
- Ruellia parvifolia Urb.
- Ruellia shaferiana Urb.
- Ruellia simplex C.Wright
- Ruellia tuberosa L.
- Sapphoa* Urb.
  - Sapphoa ekmanii* Borhidi
  - Sapphoa rigidifolia* Urb. – Sierra de Cristal
- Stenandrium arnoldii* H.Dietr. – Holguín
- Stenandrium crenatum* Urb. – eastern Cuba
- Stenandrium droseroides Nees
- Stenandrium ekmanii* Urb.
- Stenandrium heterotrichum* Borhidi – eastern Cuba
- Stenandrium ovatum* Urb. – western Cuba
- Stenandrium pallidum* H.Dietr. – eastern Cuba
- Stenandrium pinetorum* (Britton & P.Wilson) Alain – I. de la Juventud
- Stenandrium scabrosum (Sw.) Nees
- Stenandrium tuberosum ((L.) Urb.
- Stenandrium wrightii* (Lindau – eastern Cuba

== Aizoaceae ==
- Sesuvium humifusum (Turpin) Bohley & G.Kadereit
- Sesuvium maritimum (Walter) Britton, Sterns & Poggenb.
- Sesuvium portulacastrum (L.) L.
- Sesuvium rubriflorum* (Urb.) Bohley & G.Kadereit – west-central Cuba
- Trianthema portulacastrum L.

== Alismataceae ==
- Albidella nymphaeifolia (Griseb.) Pichon
- Aquarius cordifolius (L.) Christenh. & Byng
- Aquarius floribundus (Seub.) Christenh. & Byng
- Aquarius grisebachii (Small) Christenh. & Byng
- Echinodorus berteroi (Spreng.) Fassett
- Helanthium tenellum (Mart. ex Schult.f.) J.G.Sm. in N.L.Britton
- Limnocharis flava (L.) Buchenau
- Sagittaria graminea Michx.
- Sagittaria guayanensis Kunth
- Sagittaria intermedia Micheli
- Sagittaria isoetiformis J.G.Sm.
- Sagittaria lancifolia L.
- Sagittaria latifolia Willd.

== Alstroemeriaceae ==
- Bomarea edulis (Tussac) Herb.

== Amaranthaceae ==
- Achyranthes aspera L.
- Alternanthera axillaris (Willd.) DC.
- Alternanthera caracasana Kunth
- Alternanthera crassifolia* (Standl.) Alain
- Alternanthera ficoidea (L.) P.Beauv.
- Alternanthera halimifolia (Lam.) Standl. ex Pittier
- Alternanthera littoralis P.Beauv.
- Alternanthera paronychioides A.St.-Hil.
- Alternanthera pungens Kunth
- Alternanthera serpyllifolia (Poir.) Urb.
- Alternanthera sessilis (L.) DC.
- Alternanthera spinosa (Hornem.) Schult.
- Amaranthus australis (A.Gray) J.D.Sauer
- Amaranthus crassipes Schltdl.
- Amaranthus dubius Mart. ex Thell.
- Amaranthus minimus* Standl. – western Cuba
- Amaranthus polygonoides L.
- Amaranthus spinosus L.
- Amaranthus viridis L.
- Atriplex cristata Humb. & Bonpl. ex Willd.
- Celosia nitida Vahl
- Celosia virgata Jacq.
- Chamissoa altissima (Jacq.) Kunth
- Cyathula achyranthoides (Kunth) Moq.
- Froelichia interrupta (L.) Moq.
- Gomphrena brittonii* (Standl.) T.Ortuño & Borsch – central Cuba
- Gomphrena muscoides (Sw.) T.Ortuño & Borsch
- Gomphrena vermicularis L.
- Iresine angustifolia Euphrasén
- Iresine cubensis* Borsch – western Cuba
- Iresine diffusa Humb. & Bonpl. ex Willd.
- Iresine flavescens Humb. & Bonpl. ex Willd.
- Salicornia bigelovii Torr.
- Salicornia perennis Mill.
- Suaeda linearis (Elliott) Moq.
- Suaeda nigra (Raf.) J.F.Macbr.

== Amaryllidaceae ==
- Crinum oliganthum* Urb. – central Cuba
- Hymenocallis arenicola Northr.
- Hymenocallis caribaea (L.) Herb.
- Hymenocallis latifolia (Mill.) M.Roem.
- Hymenocallis ovata* (Mill.) M.Roem.
- Hymenocallis praticola* Britton & P.Wilson – central Cuba
- Zephyranthes citrina Baker
- Zephyranthes cubensis* Urb. – western Cuba
- Zephyranthes insularum* H.H.Hume ex Moldenke
- Zephyranthes wrightii* Baker

== Anacardiaceae ==
- Anacardium excelsum (Bertero & Balb. ex Kunth) Skeels
- Comocladia dentata Jacq.
- Comocladia intermedia* C.Wright ex Engl – southern Cuba
- Comocladia mollifolia Ekman & Helwig
- Comocladia pinnatifolia L.
- Comocladia platyphylla* A.Rich. ex Griseb. – central and eastern Cuba
- Metopium brownei (Jacq.) Urb.
- Metopium toxiferum (L.) Krug & Urb.
- Metopium venosum (Griseb.) Engl.
- Rhus copallinum L.
- Spondias mombin L.

== Annonaceae ==
- Annona bullata* A.Rich.
- Annona cascarilloides* Griseb. – western Cuba
- Annona crassivenia* Saff.
- Annona cristalensis* (Alain) Borhidi & Moncada – eastern Cuba
- Annona cubensis* R.E.Fr. – Sierra de Nipe
- Annona ekmanii* R.E.Fr. – Sierra de Nipe
- Annona havanensis* R.E.Fr. – west-central Cuba
- Annona glabra L.
- Annona moaensis* León & Alain
- Annona montana Macfad.
- Annona nipensis* Alain – Sierra de Nipe
- Annona oblongifolia* R.E.Fr. – eastern Cuba
- Annona sclerophylla* Saff. – eastern Cuba
- Desmopsis neglecta* (A.Rich.) R.E.Fr. – eastern Cuba
- Guatteria blainii (Griseb.) Urb.
- Oxandra lanceolata (Sw.) Baill.
- Oxandra laurifolia (Sw.) A.Rich.
- Xylopia acunae* Borhidi & E.Del-Risco
- Xylopia aromatica (Lam.) Mart.
- Xylopia ekmanii* R.E.Fr. – eastern Cuba
- Xylopia frutescens Aubl.
- Xylopia obtusifolia* (A.DC.) A.Rich.
- Xylopia roigii* P.Wilson

== Apiaceae ==
- Asciadium* Griseb.
  - Asciadium coronopifolium* Griseb.
- Centella erecta (L.f.) Fernald
- Eryngium foetidum L.
- Eryngium nasturtiifolium Juss. ex F.Delaroche
- Lilaeopsis schaffneriana (Schltdl.) J.M.Coult. & Rose
- Ptilimnium capillaceum (Michx.) Raf.
- Tiedemannia filiformis (Walter) Feist & S.R.Downie

== Apocynaceae ==
- Anechites nerium (Aubl.) Urb.
- Anemotrochus eggersii (Schltr.) Mangelsdorff, Meve & Liede
- Anemotrochus yamanigueyensis* Mangelsdorff, Meve & Liede
- Angadenia berteroi (A.DC.) Miers
- Angadenia lindeniana (Müll.Arg.) Miers
- Asclepias curassavica L.
- Asclepias nivea L.
- Asketanthera calycosa (A.Rich.) Woodson
- Cameraria latifolia L.
- Cameraria microphylla Britton – Camagüey
- Cameraria obovalis* Alain – eastern Cuba (Cerro de Miraflores)
- Cameraria orientensis* Bisse – eastern Cuba
- Cameraria retusa* Griseb. – western and central Cuba
- Cynanchum cubense* (A.Rich.) Woodson
- Cynanchum racemosum (Jacq.) Jacq.
  - Cynanchum racemosum var. havanense* Sundell – west-central Cuba
- Echites agglutinatus Jacq.
- Echites brevipedunculatus* Lippold
- Echites cajalbanicus* Lippold
- Echites umbellatus Jacq.
- Fischeria crispiflora (Sw.) K.Schum.
- Fischeria scandens DC.
- Forsteronia spicata (Jacq.) G.Mey.
- Funastrum clausum (Jacq.) Schltr.
- Gonolobus bakeri* Schltr.
- Gonolobus ottonis* K.Koch & C.D.Bouché
- Gonolobus stephanotrichus Griseb.
- Ibatia maritima (Jacq.) Decne.
- Ibatia mollis* Griseb. – western and central Cuba
- Mandevilla subsagittata (Ruiz & Pav.) Woodson
- Mandevilla torosa (Jacq.) Woodson
- Matelea alainii* Woodson – eastern Cuba
- Matelea angustifolia* (Griseb.) Greuter & Liede
- † Matelea grisebachiana* (Schltr.) Alain eastern Cuba
- Matelea tamnifolia* (Griseb.) Woodson – western and central Cuba
- Mesechites minimus* (Britton & P.Wilson) Woodson – east-central and eastern Cuba
- Mesechites roseus* (A.DC.) Miers
- Metastelma bahamense Griseb.
- Metastelma brachystephanum* Griseb.
- Metastelma cubense* Decne.
- Metastelma decipiens Schltr.
- Metastelma hamatum Griseb.
- Metastelma hamatum* Griseb.
- Metastelma linearifolium A.Rich.
- Metastelma pauciflorum* (Griseb.) Schltr.
- Metastelma penicillatum Griseb.
- Metastelma pubipetalum* (Alain) Liede
- Metastelma readii Schltr.
- Metastelma rupicola* Urb.
- Meveampelos* Morillo
  - Meveampelos bicolor* (Britton & P.Wilson) Morillo – southeastern Cuba
  - Meveampelos ekmanii* (Urb.) Morillo – eastern Cuba
- Neobracea acunana* Lippold - eastern Cuba
- Neobracea angustifolia* Britton – western Cuba
- Neobracea bahamensis (Britton) Britton
- Neobracea ekmanii* Urb. – eastern Cuba
- Neobracea howardii* Woodson – east-central Cuba
- Neobracea martiana* Borhidi & O.Muñiz – eastern Cuba
- Neobracea susannina* Borhidi – eastern Cuba
- Neobracea valenzuelana* (A.Rich.) Urb.
- Orthosia scoparia (Nutt.) Liede & Meve
- Oxypetalum cordifolium (Vent.) Schltr.
- Pattalias palustris (Pursh) Fishbein
- Pentalinon luteum (L.) B.F.Hansen & Wunderlin
- Pinochia corymbosa (Jacq.) M.E.Endress & B.F.Hansen
- Plumeria clusioides* Griseb.
- Plumeria cubensis* Urb.
- Plumeria ekmanii* Urb.
- Plumeria emarginata* Griseb.
- Plumeria filifolia* Griseb. – eastern Cuba
- Plumeria lanata* Britton
- Plumeria montana* Britton & P.Wilson
- Plumeria obtusa L.
- Plumeria trinitensis* Britton
- Plumeria venosa* Britton
- Ptycanthera acuminata* (Griseb.) Morillo – eastern Cuba
- Ptycanthera nipensis* (Urb.) Morillo – eastern Cuba (Sierra de Nipe)
- Ptycanthera oblongata* (Griseb.) Schltr. – western Cuba
- Ptycanthera ovatifolia (Griseb.) Schltr. – eastern Cuba and Hispaniola
- Ptycanthera tigrina* (Griseb.) Morillo - eastern Cuba
- Rauvolfia biauriculata Müll.Arg.
- Rauvolfia cubana* A.DC.
- Rauvolfia × ivanovii* Granda & V.R.Fuentes (R. ligustrina × R. viridis)
- Rauvolfia ligustrina Roem. & Schult.
- Rauvolfia linearifolia* Britton & P.Wilson – eastern Cuba
- Rauvolfia nitida Jacq.
- Rauvolfia salicifolia* Griseb.
- Rhabdadenia biflora (Jacq.) Müll.Arg.
- Ruehssia affinis* (A.Rich.) Morillo – eastern Cuba
- Ruehssia campanulata* (Griseb.) Morillo & Mora Méndez
- Ruehssia clausa (R.Br.) Liede, S.Reuss & Meve
- Ruehssia cubensis* (Turcz.) Liede, S.Reuss & Meve
- Ruehssia fusca (C.Wright ex Griseb.) Liede, S.Reuss & Meve
- Ruehssia linearis (Decne.) Liede, S.Reuss & Meve
- Ruehssia longiflora* (A.Rich.) Liede, S.Reuss & Meve
- Ruehssia saturejifolia (A.Rich.) Liede, S.Reuss & Meve
- Ruehssia umbellata* (Griseb.) Liede, S.Reuss & Meve
- Ruehssia vinciflora* (Griseb.) Liede, S.Reuss & Meve
- Ruehssia yamanigueyensis* Mangelsdorff
- Ruehssia linearis* (Decne.) Liede, S.Reuss & Meve
- Tabernaemontana alba Mill.
- Tabernaemontana amygdalifolia Jacq.
- Tabernaemontana apoda* C.Wright
- Tabernaemontana citrifolia L.
- Tassadia richardiana* (Alain) Liede & Mangelsdorff
- Thevetia ahouai (L.) Vahl
- Tylodontia* Griseb.
  - Tylodontia cubensis* Griseb. – western Cuba
  - Tylodontia fuscula* (C.Wright) Mangelsdorff, Meve & Liede – eastern Cuba
  - Tylodontia stipitata* Mangelsdorff, Meve & Liede
  - Tylodontia urceolata* (Griseb.) Mangelsdorff, Meve & Liede – eastern Cuba
- Vallesia antillana Woodson
- Vallesia montana Urb.

== Aquifoliaceae ==
- Ilex bahiahondica* (Loes.) P.A.González
- Ilex berteroi Loes. – southeastern Cuba and Hispaniola
- Ilex cassine L.
- Ilex clementis* Britton & P.Wilson – south-central Cuba
- Ilex cubana Loes. – southeastern Cuba and Hispaniola
- Ilex eoa Alain – southeastern Cuba
- Ilex gundlachiana Loes. – southeastern Cuba
- Ilex hypaneura Loes. – southeastern Cuba
- Ilex macfadyenii (Walp.) Rehder
  - Ilex macfadyenii subsp. macfadyenii
  - Ilex macfadyenii var. moana* (Borhidi & O.Muñiz) P.A.González – eastern Cuba
- Ilex manitzii* P.A.González – eastern Cuba (Sierra de Cristal)
- Ilex nitida (Vahl) Maxim.
- Ilex obcordata Sw.
- Ilex sideroxyloides (Sw.) Griseb.
- Ilex valenzuelana* Alain – southeastern Cuba
- Ilex victorinii* Alain – eastern Cuba
- Ilex walsinghamii* R.A.Howard – southeastern Cuba (Yunque de Baracoa)

== Araceae ==
- Anthurium cubense Engl.
- Anthurium gymnopus* Griseb.
- Anthurium scandens (Aubl.) Engl.
- Anthurium thompsoniae* I.Arias – southeastern Cuba
- Anthurium venosum Griseb. – western Cuba and Jamaica
- Dieffenbachia seguine (Jacq.) Schott
- Lemna aequinoctialis Welw.
- Lemna valdiviana Phil.
- Peltandra virginica (L.) Schott
- Philodendron consanguineum Schott
- Philodendron fragrantissimum (Hook.) G.Don
- Philodendron hederaceum (Jacq.) Schott
- Philodendron jacquinii Schott
- Philodendron lacerum (Jacq.) Schott
- Pistia stratiotes L.
- Spirodela polyrhiza (L.) Schleid.
- Spirodela punctata (G.Mey.) C.H.Thomps.
- Syngonium auritum (L.) Schott
- Wolffia brasiliensis Wedd.
- Wolffiella lingulata (Hegelm.) Hegelm.
- Wolffiella welwitschii (Hegelm.) Monod
- Xanthosoma cubense* (Schott) Schott

== Araliaceae ==
- Aralia duplex* R.Chaves
- Aralia rex* (Ekman) J.Wen – west-central and central Cuba
- Dendropanax arboreus (L.) Decne. & Planch.
- Dendropanax cuneifolius* (C.Wright ex Griseb.) Seem. – western and central Cuba
- Dendropanax nervosus* (Urb. & Ekman) A.C.Sm. – Sierra del Cristal
- Didymopanax morototoni (Aubl.) Decne. & Planch.
- Hydrocotyle bonariensis Comm. ex Lam.
- Hydrocotyle hirsuta Sw.
- Hydrocotyle oligantha* Urb.
- Hydrocotyle pusilla A.Rich.
- Hydrocotyle pygmaea* C.Wright
- Hydrocotyle ranunculoides L.f.
- Hydrocotyle umbellata L.
- Hydrocotyle verticillata Thunb.
- Oreopanax capitatus (Jacq.) Decne. & Planch.

== Arecaceae ==
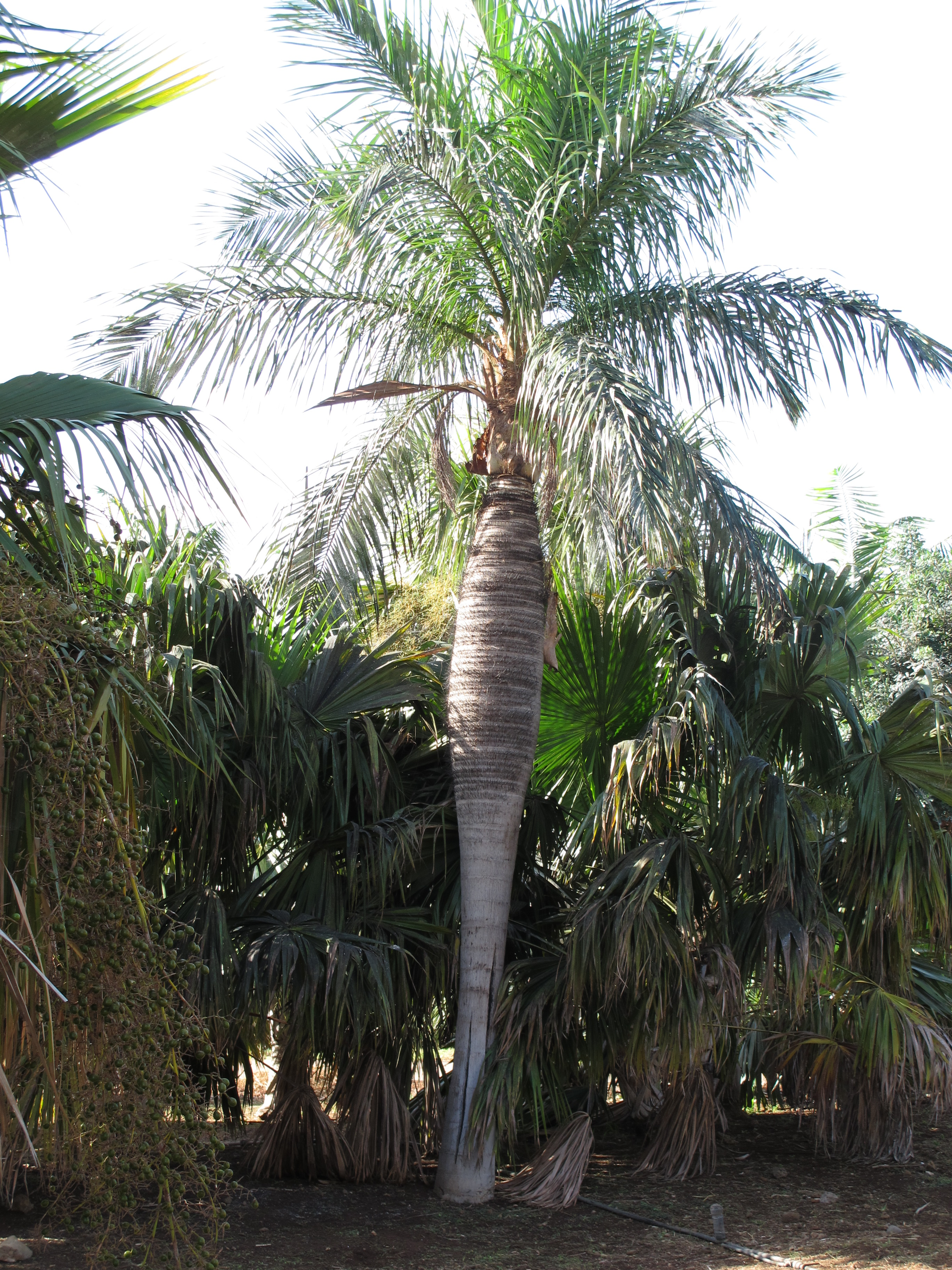
Acrocomia crispa

- Acoelorraphe wrightii (Griseb. & H.Wendl.) H.Wendl. ex Becc.
- Acrocomia aculeata (Jacq.) Sweet
- Acrocomia crispa* (Kunth) C.F.Baker ex Becc.
- Bactris cubensis* Burret – eastern Cuba
- Calyptronoma occidentalis (Sw.) H.E.Moore
- Calyptronoma plumeriana (Mart.) Lourteig
- Coccothrinax acuminata* Sarg. ex Becc. – western Cuba incl. I. de la Juventud
- Coccothrinax acunana* León – Pico Turquino
- Coccothrinax alexandri* León – eastern Cuba
- Coccothrinax × angelae* D.Suárez (C. crinita subsp. brevicrinis × C. miraguama subsp. roseocarpa) – south-central Cuba
- Coccothrinax baracoensis* Borhidi & O.Muñiz – southeastern Cuba
- Coccothrinax bermudezii* León – southeastern Cuba
- Coccothrinax borhidiana* O.Muñiz – Matanzas
- Coccothrinax camagueyana* Borhidi & O.Muñiz – east-central Cuba
- Coccothrinax clarensis* León – eastern Cuba
- Coccothrinax crinita* (R.D.Hoyt) Becc.
- Coccothrinax cupularis* (León) O.Muñiz & Borhidi
- Coccothrinax elegans* O.Muñiz & Borhidi
- Coccothrinax fagildei* Borhidi & O.Muñiz
- Coccothrinax fragrans Burret – eastern Cuba and Hispaniola
- Coccothrinax garciana* León – Holguín
- Coccothrinax guantanamensis* (León) O.Muñiz & Borhidi – eastern Cuba
- Coccothrinax gundlachii* León – central and eastern Cuba
- Coccothrinax hioramii* León – eastern Cuba
- Coccothrinax leonis* O.Muñiz & Borhidi – Cuba
- Coccothrinax litoralis* León – Cuba
- Coccothrinax macroglossa* (León) O.Muñiz & Borhidi – eastern Cuba
- Coccothrinax microphylla* Borhidi & O.Muñiz – eastern Cuba
- Coccothrinax miraguama* (Kunth) Becc.
- Coccothrinax moaensis* (Borhidi & O.Muñiz) O.Muñiz – eastern Cuba
- Coccothrinax munizii* Borhidi – eastern Cuba
- Coccothrinax muricata* León – east-central Cuba
- Coccothrinax nipensis* Borhidi & O.Muñiz – eastern Cuba
- Coccothrinax orientalis* (León) O.Muñiz & Borhidi – eastern Cuba
- Coccothrinax pauciramosa* Burret – eastern Cuba
- Coccothrinax pseudorigida* León – east-central Cuba
- Coccothrinax pumila* Borhidi & J.A.Hern.
- Coccothrinax rigida* Borhidi & J.A.Hern. – eastern Cuba
- Coccothrinax salvatoris* León – east-central and eastern Cuba
- Coccothrinax saxicola* León – eastern Cuba
- Coccothrinax spirituana* Verdecia & Moya
- Coccothrinax torrida* Morici & Verdecia
- Coccothrinax trinitensis* Borhidi & O.Muñiz – east-central Cuba
- Coccothrinax victorinii* León – eastern Cuba
- Coccothrinax yunquensis* Borhidi & O.Muñiz – southern Cuba
- Coccothrinax yuraguana* León – western Cuba
- Colpothrinax wrightii* Schaedtler – southwestern Cuba incl. I. de la Juventud
- Copernicia baileyana* León – central and eastern Cuba
- Copernicia brittonorum* León – western and west-central Cuba
- Copernicia × burretiana* León (C. hospita × C. macroglossa)
- Copernicia cowellii* Britton & P.Wilson – Camagüey
- Copernicia curbeloi* León
- Copernicia curtissii* Becc.
- Copernicia × dahlgreniana* Verdecia (C. cowellii × C. macroglossa)
- Copernicia fallaensis* León
- Copernicia gigas* Ekman ex Burret
- Copernicia glabrescens* H.Wendl. ex Becc. – western and west-central Cuba
- Copernicia hospita* Mart.
- Copernicia humicola* León
- Copernicia longiglossa* León – eastern Cuba
- Copernicia macroglossa* Schaedtler – western and central Cuba
- Copernicia molinetii* León
- Copernicia × occidentalis* León (C. brittonanum × C. hospita)
- Copernicia oxycalyx* Burret – east-central and eastern Cuba
- Copernicia rigida* Britton & P.Wilson
- Copernicia roigii* León
- Copernicia × shaferi* Dahlgren & Glassman (C. cowellii × C. hospita) – east-central Cuba
- Copernicia × sueroana* León (C. hospita × C. rigida) – central and east-central Cuba
- Copernicia × textilis* León (C. baileyana × C. hospita) – central and eastern Cuba
- Copernicia × vespertilionum* León – central and eastern Cuba
- Copernicia yarey* Burret – east-central and eastern Cuba
- Gaussia princeps* H.Wendl. – western Cuba
- Gaussia spirituana* Moya & Leiva – east-central Cuba (Sierra de Jatibonico)
- Hemithrinax compacta* (Griseb. & H.Wendl.) Hook.f. ex Salomon – eastern Cuba (Sierra de Nipe)
- Hemithrinax ekmaniana* Burret – central Cuba (Las Villas)
- Hemithrinax rivularis* León – eastern Cuba (Sierra de Moa)
- Leucothrinax morrisii (H.Wendl.) C.Lewis & Zona
- Prestoea acuminata (Willd.) H.E.Moore
- Pseudophoenix sargentii H.Wendl. ex Sarg.
- Roystonea lenis* León – eastern Cuba
- Roystonea maisiana* (L.H.Bailey) Zona – eastern Cuba
- Roystonea regia (Kunth) O.F.Cook
- † Roystonea stellata* León – eastern Cuba (Maisí Reg.)
- Roystonea violacea* León – eastern Cuba (Maisí Reg.)
- Sabal domingensis Becc. – eastern Cuba to northwestern and central Hispaniola
- Sabal maritima (Kunth) Burret
- Sabal palmetto (Walter) Lodd. ex Schult. & Schult.f.
- Sabal yapa Becc.
- Thrinax radiata Lodd. ex Schult. & Schult.f.

== Aristolochiaceae ==
- Aristolochia baracoensis* R.Rankin – southeastern Cuba
- Aristolochia clavidenia* C.Wright ex Griseb.
- Aristolochia clementis* Alain
- Aristolochia glandulosa* Scheidw. – western and central Cuba
- Aristolochia lindeniana* Duch.
- Aristolochia linearifolia C.Wright ex Griseb.
- Aristolochia microphylla* Sessé & Moc.
- Aristolochia oblongata Jacq.
- Aristolochia passiflorifolia* A.Rich.
- Aristolochia pentandra Jacq.
- Aristolochia tigrina* A.Rich.
- Aristolochia trichostoma* Griseb.
- Aristolochia trilobata L.

== Asparagaceae ==
- Agave acicularis* Trel. – central Cuba
- Agave albescens* Trel. – eastern Cuba
- Agave anomala Trel.
- Agave antillarum Descourt.
- Agave brittoniana* Trel. – central Cuba
- Agave cajalbanenesis* A.Álvarez – western Cuba
- Agave grisea* Trel. – southern Cuba
- Agave jarucoensis* A.Álvarez – western Cuba
- Agave melanacantha* Lem. ex Jacobi – central Cuba
- Agave offoyana* De Smet ex Jacobi – Cuba (Villa Clara)
- Agave papyrocarpa* Trel. – Cuba (I. de la Juventud)
- Agave shaferi* Trel. – eastern Cuba
- Agave sobolifera Houtt.
- Agave tubulata* Trel. – western Cuba
- Agave underwoodii* Trel. – eastern Cuba
- Agave wildingii* Tod. – western Cuba
- Dracaena cubensis* Vict. – eastern Cuba
- Furcraea antillana A.Álvarez
- Furcraea hexapetala (Jacq.) Urb.
- Furcraea tuberosa (Mill.) W.T.Aiton

== Aspleniaceae ==
- Asplenium abscissum Willd.
- Asplenium auriculatum Sw.
- Asplenium claussenii Hieron.
- Asplenium cristatum Lam.
- Asplenium cuneatum Lam.
- Asplenium dentatum L.
- Asplenium dimidiatum Sw.
- Asplenium diplosceum Hieron.
- Asplenium erosum L.
- Asplenium feei Kunze ex Fée
- Asplenium flabellulatum Kunze
- Asplenium formosum Willd.
- Asplenium fragrans Sw.
- Asplenium heterochroum Kunze
- Asplenium jenmanii Proctor
- Asplenium juglandifolium Lam.
- Asplenium × lellingerianum* C.Sánchez & L.Regalado (A. auritum × A. monodon)
- Asplenium myriophyllum (Sw.) C.Presl
- Asplenium nigripes (Fée ex T.Moore) Hook.
- Asplenium praemorsum Sw.
- Asplenium pteropus Kaulf.
- Asplenium pumilum Sw.
- Asplenium radicans L.
- Asplenium rectangulare Maxon
- Asplenium salicifolium L.
- Asplenium serra Langsd. & Fisch.
- Asplenium serratum L.
- Asplenium veneticolor* L.
- Asplenium venustum* Underw. & Maxon
- Asplenium verecundum Chapm.
- Blechnum divergens (Kunze) Mett.
- Blechnum fragile (Liebm.) C.V.Morton & Lellinger
- Blechnum jamaicense C.Chr.
- Blechnum lineatum (Sw.) Hieron.
- Blechnum occidentale L.
- Blechnum polypodioides Raddi
- Blechnum shaferi* (Broadh.) C.Chr.
- Blechnum tuerckheimii Brause
- Diplazium aemulum Underw. & Maxon
- Diplazium altissimum (Jenman) C.Chr.
- Diplazium centripetale (Baker) Maxon
- Diplazium cristatum (Desr.) Alston
- Diplazium expansum Willd.
- Diplazium grandifolium (Sw.) Sw.
- Diplazium hymenodes (Mett.) Á.Löve & D.Löve
- Diplazium lherminieri Fée
- Diplazium plantaginifolium (L.) Urb.
- Diplazium roemerianum (Kunze) C.Presl
- Diplazium striatum (L.) C.Presl
- Diplazium unilobum Hieron.
- Diplazium urbani (Christ) C.Chr.
- Hemidictyum marginatum (L.) C.Presl
- Hymenasplenium delitescens (Maxon) L.Regalado & Prada
- Hymenasplenium laetum (Sw.) L.Regalado & Prada
- Telmatoblechnum serrulatum (Rich.) Perrie, D.J.Ohlsen & Brownsey
- Thelypteris acunae* C.Sánchez & Zavaro
- Thelypteris alata (L.) C.F.Reed
- Thelypteris angustifolia (Willd.) Proctor
- Thelypteris arborescens (Willd.) C.V.Morton
- Thelypteris augescens (Link) Munz & I.M.Johnst.
- Thelypteris balbisii (Spreng.) Ching
- Thelypteris basisceletica C.Sánchez, Caluff & O.Alvarez
- Thelypteris biolleyi (Christ) Proctor
- Thelypteris concinna (Willd.) Ching
- Thelypteris cordata (Fée) Proctor
- Thelypteris crassipila Caluff & C.Sánchez
- Thelypteris crypta (Underw. & Maxon) C.F.Reed
- Thelypteris decussata (L.) Proctor
- Thelypteris deltoidea (Sw.) Proctor
- Thelypteris denudata C.Sánchez & Caluff
- Thelypteris dissimulans (Maxon & C.Chr.) C.F.Reed
- Thelypteris falcata (Liebm.) R.M.Tryon
- Thelypteris germaniana (Fée) Proctor
- Thelypteris gongylodes (Schkuhr) Small
- Thelypteris guadalupensis (Wikstr.) Proctor
- Thelypteris heteroclita (Desv.) Ching
- Thelypteris hispidula (Decne.) C.F.Reed
- Thelypteris invisa (Sw.) Proctor
- Thelypteris jarucoensis* Maxon ex Caluff & C.Sánchez
- Thelypteris kunthii (Desv.) C.V.Morton
- Thelypteris leonina* Maxon ex Caluff & C.Sánchez
- Thelypteris lonchodes* (D.C.Eaton) Ching
- Thelypteris malangae (C.Chr.) C.V.Morton
  - Thelypteris malangae var. malangae*
- Thelypteris minutissima* Caluff & C.Sánchez
- Thelypteris obliterata (Sw.) Proctor
- Thelypteris oligocarpa (Humb. & Bonpl. ex Willd.) Ching
- Thelypteris opposita (Vahl) Ching
- Thelypteris oviedoae* C.Sánchez & Zavaro
- Thelypteris palustris Schott
- Thelypteris patens (Sw.) Small
- Thelypteris pennata (Poir.) C.V.Morton
- Thelypteris piedrensis (C.Chr.) C.V.Morton
  - Thelypteris piedrensis var. heterotricha* Caluff & C.Sánchez
  - Thelypteris piedrensis var. piedrensis
- Thelypteris poiteana (Bory) Proctor
- Thelypteris reptans (J.F.Gmel.) C.V.Morton
- Thelypteris resinifera (Desv.) Proctor
- Thelypteris reticulata (L.) Proctor
- Thelypteris retroflexa (L.) Proctor & Lourteig
- Thelypteris × rolandii (C.Chr.) R.M.Tryon
- Thelypteris rudis (Kunze) Proctor
- Thelypteris sagittata (Sw.) Proctor
- Thelypteris sancta (L.) Ching
- Thelypteris scalpturoides (Fée) C.F.Reed
- Thelypteris schizotis (Hook.) M.Kessler & A.R.Sm.
- Thelypteris sclerophylla (Poepp. ex Spreng.) C.V.Morton
- Thelypteris scolopendrioides (L.) Proctor
- Thelypteris semihastata (Kunze) Ching
- Thelypteris serra (Sw.) R.P.St.John
- Thelypteris serrata (Cav.) Alston
- Thelypteris shaferi* (Maxon & C.Chr.) Duek
- Thelypteris tetragona (Sw.) Small
- Thelypteris wrightii* (Mett. ex D.C.Eaton) C.F.Reed

== Asteraceae ==
- Acanthodesmos gibarensis* P.Herrera & P.A.González
- Acanthospermum hispidum DC.
- Acanthospermum humile (Sw.) DC.
- Acmella brachyglossa Cass.
- Acmella radicans (Jacq.) R.K.Jansen
- Acmella repens (Walter) Rich.
- Adenophyllum porophyllum (Cav.) Hemsl.
- Adenostemma brasilianum (Pers.) Cass.
- Adenostemma verbesina Kuntze
- Ageratina corylifolia (Griseb.) R.M.King & H.Rob.
- Ageratina havanensis (Kunth) R.M.King & H.Rob.
- Ageratina mortoniana* (Alain) R.M.King & H.Rob.
- Ageratina paucibracteata* (Alain) R.M.King & H.Rob.
- Ageratum littorale A.Gray
- Ageratum maritimum Kunth
- Ambrosia hispida Pursh
- Ambrosia peruviana All.
- Ambrosia velutina O.E.Schulz
- Anastraphia attenuata* Britton
- Anastraphia calcicola* Britton
- Anastraphia cowellii* Britton
- Anastraphia crassifolia* Britton
- Anastraphia crebribracteata* Ventosa & P.Herrera
- Anastraphia cristalensis* Ventosa & P.Herrera
- Anastraphia cubensis* Carabia
- Anastraphia ekmanii* Urb.
- Anastraphia elliptica* León
- Anastraphia geigeliae* Ventosa & P.Herrera
- Anastraphia gomezii* León
- Anastraphia herrerae* Ventosa
- Anastraphia ilicifolia* D.Don
- Anastraphia intertexta* C.Wright ex Griseb.
- Anastraphia maisiana* León
- Anastraphia mantuensis* C.Wright ex Griseb.
- Anastraphia microcephala* Griseb.
- Anastraphia montana* Britton
- Anastraphia northropiana Greenm.
- Anastraphia obtusifolia* Britton
- Anastraphia oviedoae* Ventosa & P.Herrera
- Anastraphia parvifolia* Britton
- Anastraphia recurva* Britton
- Anastraphia shaferi* Britton
- Anastraphia wilsonii* Britton
- Antillanthus* B.Nord.
  - Antillanthus acunae* (Borhidi) B.Nord.
  - Antillanthus azulensis* (Alain) B.Nord.
  - Antillanthus biseriatus* (Alain) B.Nord.
  - Antillanthus carinatus* (Greenm.) B.Nord.
  - Antillanthus cubensis* (Greenm.) B.Nord.
  - Antillanthus discolor* (Griseb.) J.-S.Girard
  - Antillanthus ekmanii* (Alain) B.Nord.
  - Antillanthus eriocarphus* (Greenm.) B.Nord.
  - Antillanthus leucolepis* (Greenm.) B.Nord.
  - Antillanthus moaensis* (Alain) B.Nord.
  - Antillanthus moldenkei* (Greenm. & Alain) B.Nord.
  - Antillanthus pachylepis* (Greenm.) B.Nord.
  - Antillanthus pachypodus* (Greenm.) B.Nord.
  - Antillanthus saugetii* (Alain) B.Nord.
  - Antillanthus shaferi* (Greenm.) B.Nord.
  - Antillanthus subsquarrosus* (Greenm.) B.Nord.
  - Antillanthus trichotomus* (Greenm.) B.Nord.
- Antillia* R.M.King & H.Rob.
  - Antillia brachychaeta* (B.L.Rob.) R.M.King & H.Rob.
- Baccharis acutata* (Alain) Borhidi
- Baccharis dioica Vahl
- Baccharis glomeruliflora Pers.
- Baccharis halimifolia L.
- Baccharis nipensis* Urb.
- Baccharis orientalis* Alain
- Baccharis punctulata DC.
- Baccharis scoparia Sw.
- Baccharis scoparioides* Griseb.
- Baccharis shaferi* Britton
- Baltimora geminata (Brandegee) Stuessy
- Berylsimpsonia vanillosma (C.Wright) B.L.Turner
- Bidens alba (L.) DC.
- Bidens cynapiifolia Kunth
- Bidens laevis (L.) Britton, Sterns & Poggenb.
- Bidens pilosa L.
- Bidens reptans G.Don
- Bidens squarrosa Kunth
- Bidens tenera O.E.Schulz
- Borrichia arborescens (L.) DC.
- Brickellia diffusa (Vahl) A.Gray
- Calyptocarpus vialis Less.
- Chaptalia albicans (Sw.) Benth. & Hook.f. ex Klatt
- Chaptalia comptonioides* Britton & P.Wilson
- Chaptalia crassiuscula* Urb.
- Chaptalia dentata (L.) Cass.
- Chaptalia ekmanii* Urb.
- Chaptalia fallax* Greene
- Chaptalia leptophylla* Urb.
- Chaptalia media* Urb.
- Chaptalia montana* Britton
- Chaptalia nipensis* Urb.
- Chaptalia nutans (L.) Pol.
- Chaptalia obovata* C.Wright
- Chaptalia pumila (Sw.) Fawc.
- Chaptalia rocana* Britton & P.Wilson
- Chaptalia shaferi* Britton & P.Wilson
- Chaptalia stenocephala* Urb.
- Chaptalia turquinensis* Borhidi & O.Muñiz
- Chromolaena corymbosa (Aubl.) R.M.King & H.Rob.
- Chromolaena ivifolia (L.) R.M.King & H.Rob.
- Chromolaena odorata (L.) R.M.King & H.Rob.
- Chromolaena sinuata (Lam.) R.M.King & H.Rob.
- Chrysanthellum americanum (L.) Vatke
- Ciceronia* Urb.
  - Ciceronia chaptalioides* Urb.
- Clibadium terebinthinaceum (Sw.) DC.
- Condylidium iresinoides (Kunth) R.M.King & H.Rob.
- Conoclinium coelestinum (L.) DC.
- Critonia aromatisans (DC.) R.M.King & H.Rob.
- Critonia dalea (L.) DC.
- Critonia imbricata Griseb.
- Critonia pseudodalea DC.
- Eclipta prostrata (L.) L.
- Egletes prostrata (Sw.) Kuntze
- Ekmania* Gleason
  - Ekmania lepidota* Gleason
- Elephantopus arenarius Britton
- Elephantopus mollis Kunth
- Elephantopus pratensis C.Wright
- Eleutheranthera ruderalis (Sw.) Sch.Bip.
- Emilia fosbergii Nicolson
- Enydra sessilis* DC.
- Erechtites hieraciifolius (L.) Raf. ex DC.
- Epaltes mattfeldii Urb.
- Erigeron bellidiastroides* Griseb.
- Erigeron bellioides DC.
- Erigeron bonariensis L.
- Erigeron capillipes* Ekman ex Urb.
- Erigeron cuneifolius DC.
- Erigeron hyoseroides* Griseb.
- Erigeron jamaicensis L.
- Erigeron laevigatus Rich.
- Erigeron libanensis* Urb.
- Erigeron paucilobus Urb.
- Erigeron taylorii Britton & P.Wilson
- Erigeron thrincioides Griseb.
- Eupatorium leptophyllum DC.
- Feddea* Urb.
  - Feddea cubensis* Urb.
- Flaveria linearis Lag.
- Flaveria trinervia (Spreng.) C.Mohr
- Fleischmannia microstemon (Cass.) R.M.King & H.Rob.
- Gamochaeta americana (Mill.) Wedd.
- Gamochaeta antillana (Urb.) Anderb.
- Gamochaeta pensylvanica (Willd.) Cabrera
- Gamochaeta purpurea (L.) Cabrera
- Gochnatia sagrana* R.N.Jervis & Alain
- Grisebachianthus* R.M.King & H.Rob.
  - Grisebachianthus carsticola* (Borhidi & O.Muñiz) R.M.King & H.Rob.
  - Grisebachianthus hypoleucus* (Griseb.) R.M.King & H.Rob.
  - Grisebachianthus lantanifolius* (Griseb.) R.M.King & H.Rob.
  - Grisebachianthus libanoticus* (Sch.Bip.) R.M.King & H.Rob.
  - Grisebachianthus mayarensis* (Alain) R.M.King & H.Rob.
  - Grisebachianthus nipensis* (B.L.Rob.) R.M.King & H.Rob.
  - Grisebachianthus plucheoides* (Griseb.) R.M.King & H.Rob.
- Gundlachia corymbosa (Urb.) Britton ex Bold.
  - Gundlachia corymbosa var. apiculata* (Britton & S.F.Blake) M.A.Lane
  - Gundlachia corymbosa var. cubana* (Britton & S.F.Blake) M.A.Lane
  - Gundlachia corymbosa var. foliosa* (Britton & S.F.Blake) M.A.Lane
- Gundlachia domingensis (Spreng.) A.Gray
- Harnackia* Urb.
  - Harnackia bisecta* Urb.
- Hebeclinium macrophyllum (L.) DC.
- Helenium quadridentatum Labill.
- Helenium scaposum* Britton
- Heptanthus* Griseb.
  - Heptanthus brevipes* Griseb.
  - Heptanthus cochlearifolius* Griseb.
  - Heptanthus cordifolius* Britton
  - Heptanthus lobatus* Britton
  - Heptanthus ranunculoides* Griseb.
  - Heptanthus shaferi* Britton
  - Heptanthus yumuriensis* Borhidi
- Herreranthus* B.Nord.
  - Herreranthus rivalis* (Greenm.) B.Nord.
- Isocarpha atriplicifolia (L.) R.Br. ex DC.
- Isocarpha oppositifolia (L.) Cass.
  - Isocarpha oppositifolia var. glabrata* (S.F.Blake) Borhidi
- Iva cheiranthifolia Kunth
- Iva imbricata Walter
- Koanophyllon atroglandulosum* (Alain) R.M.King & H.Rob.
- Koanophyllon ayapanoides* (Griseb.) R.M.King & H.Rob.
- Koanophyllon breviflorum* (Alain) R.M.King & H.Rob.
- Koanophyllon bullescens* (B.L.Rob.) R.M.King & H.Rob.
- Koanophyllon chalceorithales* (B.L.Rob.) R.M.King & H.Rob.
- Koanophyllon clementis* (Alain) R.M.King & H.Rob.
- Koanophyllon ekmanii* (B.L.Rob.) R.M.King & H.Rob.
- Koanophyllon grandiceps* (C.Wright) R.M.King & H.Rob.
- Koanophyllon grisebachianum* (Alain) R.M.King & H.Rob.
- Koanophyllon gundlachii* (Urb.) R.M.King & H.Rob.
- Koanophyllon helianthemoides* (B.L.Rob.) R.M.King & H.Rob.
- Koanophyllon hidrodes* B.L.Rob.) R.M.King & H.Rob.
- Koanophyllon littorale* R.M.King & H.Rob.
- Koanophyllon maestrense* (Urb.) R.M.King & H.Rob.
- Koanophyllon minutifolium* (Alain) R.M.King & H.Rob.
- Koanophyllon muricatum* (Alain) R.M.King & H.Rob.
- Koanophyllon nudiflorum* (A.Rich.) R.M.King & H.Rob.
- Koanophyllon oligadenium* (Alain) R.M.King & H.Rob.
- Koanophyllon polystictum* (Urb.) R.M.King & H.Rob.
- Koanophyllon prinodes* (B.L.Rob.) R.M.King & H.Rob.
- Koanophyllon rhexioides* (B.L.Rob.) R.M.King & H.Rob.
- Koanophyllon silvaticum* (B.L.Rob.) R.M.King & H.Rob.
- Koanophyllon turquinense* (Alain) Borhidi
- Koanophyllon villosum (Sw.) R.M.King & H.Rob.
  - Koanophyllon villosum subsp. cubense* (DC.) Borhidi
  - Koanophyllon villosum subsp. cynanchifolium* (DC.) Borhidi
  - Koanophyllon villosum subsp. lindenianum* (A.Rich.) Borhidi
- Koehneola* Urb.
  - Koehneola repens* (O.Hoffm.) Urb.
- Lachnorhiza* A.Rich.
  - Lachnorhiza asteroides* Griseb.
  - Lachnorhiza micrantha* (Borhidi) Borhidi
  - Lachnorhiza piloselloides* A.Rich.
- Lagascea mollis Cav.
- Lantanopsis hispidula C.Wright
- Lantanopsis tomentosa* Borhidi & Moncada
- Leonis trineura (Griseb.) B.Nord.
- Lepidaploa aronifolia* (Gleason) H.Rob.
- Lepidaploa commutata* (Ekman) H.Rob.
- Lepidaploa complicata* (C.Wright ex Griseb.) H.Rob.
- Lepidaploa desiliens* (Gleason) H.Rob.
- Lepidaploa gnaphaliifolia (A.Rich.) H.Rob.
  - Lepidaploa gnaphaliifolia subsp. angustata* (Gleason) J.L.Gómez
- Lepidaploa jenssenii* (Ekman) H.Rob.
- Lepidaploa leptoclada* (Sch.Bip.) H.Rob.
- Lepidaploa orbicularis* (Alain) H.Rob.
- Lepidaploa pineticola* (Gleason) H.Rob.
- Lepidaploa purpurata* (Gleason) H.Rob.
- Lepidaploa reedii* (Ekman ex Urb.) J.L.Gómez & Bécquer
- Lepidaploa sagrana* (DC.) H.Rob.
- Lepidaploa segregata* (Gleason) H.Rob.
- Lepidaploa stenophylla (Less.) H.Rob.
- Lepidaploa urbaniana* (Ekman ex Urb.) H.Rob.
- Lepidaploa valenzuelana* (A.Rich.) J.L.Gómez
- Lepidaploa viminalis* (Gleason) H.Rob.
- Lepidaploa wrightii* (Sch.Bip.) H.Rob.
- Lepidaploa yunquensis* (Gleason) H.Rob.
- Lescaillea* Griseb.
  - Lescaillea equisetiformis* Griseb.
- Liabum crispum* Sch.Bip.
- Liabum cubense* Sch.Bip.
- Liabum wrightii* Griseb.
- Lundinia plumbea (Griseb.) B.Nord.
- Melanthera nivea (L.) Small
- Mikania alba* N.Taylor
- Mikania congesta DC.
- Mikania cordifolia (L.f.) Willd.
- Mikania crispiflora* C.Wright
- Mikania hastata (L.) Willd.
- Mikania hioramii* Britton & B.L.Rob.
- Mikania micrantha Kunth
- Mikania oopetala* Urb.
- Mikania ranunculifolia* A.Rich.
- Mikania reticulosa* C.Wright
- Milleria quinqueflora L.
- Neja marginata (Griseb.) G.L.Nesom
- Neurolaena lobata (L.) Cass.
- Oldfeltia* B.Nord. & Lundin
  - Oldfeltia polyphlebia* (Griseb.) B.Nord. & Lundin
- Orthopappus angustifolius (Sw.) Gleason
- Pacourina edulis Aubl.
- Parthenium hysterophorus L.
- Pectis bonplandiana Kunth
- Pectis carthusianorum Less.
- Pectis caymanensis (Urb.) Rydb.
- Pectis ciliaris L.
- Pectis cubensis* Griseb.
- Pectis domingensis Urb.
- Pectis elongata Kunth
- Pectis glaucescens (Cass.) D.J.Keil
- Pectis havanensis* Urb.
- Pectis juniperina* Rydb.
- Pectis leonis* Rydb.
- Pectis linifolia L.
- Pectis pinosia* Urb. – I. de la Juventud
- Pectis prostrata Cav.
- Pectis ritlandii* R.A.Howard & W.R.Briggs
- Phania cajalbanica* Borhidi & O.Muñiz
- Phania domingensis Griseb.
- Phania matricarioides* Griseb.
- Pinillosia berteroi (Spreng.) Urb.
- Pluchea baccharis (Mill.) Pruski
- Pluchea carolinensis (Jacq.) G.Don
- Pluchea odorata (L.) Cass.
- Porophyllum ruderale (Jacq.) Cass.
- Pseudelephantopus spicatus (Juss. ex Aubl.) C.F.Baker
- Pseudoconyza viscosa (Mill.) D'Arcy
- Pterocaulon alopecuroides (Lam.) DC.
- Pterocaulon virgatum (L.) DC.
- Sachsia coronopifolia* (Griseb.) Anderb.
- Sachsia polycephala Griseb.
- Sachsia tricephala* Griseb.
- Salmea caleoides* Griseb.
- Salmea glaberrima* C.Wright ex Griseb.
- Salmea insipida* (Jacq.) Bolick & R.K.Jansen
- Salmea montana* (Britton & S.F.Blake) Bolick & R.K.Jansen
- Salmea pauciceps* Griseb.
- Salmea petrobioides Griseb.
- Salmea scandens (L.) DC.
- Salmea umbratilis* B.L.Rob.
- Shafera* Greenm.
  - Shafera platyphylla* Greenm.
- Solidago sempervirens L.
- Solidago virgata Michx.
- Spaniopappus* B.L.Rob.
  - Spaniopappus bucheri* (B.L.Rob.) R.King & H.Rob.
  - Spaniopappus ekmanii* B.L.Rob.
  - Spaniopappus hygrophilus* (Alain) R.M.King & H.Rob.
  - Spaniopappus iodostylus* (B.L.Rob.) R.M.King & H.Rob.
  - Spaniopappus shaferi* (B.L.Rob.) R.M.King & H.Rob.
- Sphagneticola gracilis (Rich.) Pruski
- Spilanthes urens Jacq.
- Struchium sparganophorum (L.) Kuntze
- Symphyotrichum bahamense (Britton) G.L.Nesom
- Symphyotrichum burgessii* (Britton) G.L.Nesom
- Symphyotrichum expansum (Poepp. ex Spreng.) G.L.Nesom
- Symphyotrichum leonis* (Britton) G.L.Nesom
- Symphyotrichum tenuifolium (L.) G.L.Nesom
- Synedrella nodiflora (L.) Gaertn.
- Tetraperone* Urb.
  - Tetraperone bellioides* Urb.
- Thymopsis thymoides (Griseb.) Urb.
  - Thymopsis thymoides var. glabrescens* (Urb.) Alain
  - Thymopsis thymoides var. polyantha* (Urb.) Alain
- Tilesia baccata (L.) Pruski
- Trichospira verticillata (L.) S.F.Blake
- Tridax procumbens L.
- Trixis inula Crantz
- Verbesina alata L.
- Verbesina angulata* Urb.
- Verbesina encelioides (Cav.) Benth. & Hook.f. ex A.Gray
- Verbesina gigantea Jacq.
- Verbesina rothrockii B.L.Rob. & Greenm.
- Vernonanthura havanensis* (DC.) H.Rob.
- Vernonanthura hieracioides* (Griseb.) H.Rob.
- Vernonanthura menthifolia* (Poepp. ex Spreng.) H.Rob.
- Vernonanthura tuerckheimii (Urb.) H.Rob.
- Vernonia pinarensis* Kitan.
- Wedelia calycina Rich.
- Wedelia ehrenbergii Less.
  - Wedelia ehrenbergii var. veronicifolia* O.E.Schulz
- Wedelia lanceolata DC.
- Wedelia rugosa* Greenm.
- Wedelia serrata Rich.
- Wedelia urbanii* O.E.Schulz

== Balanophoraceae ==
- Helosis antillensis L.J.T.Cardoso & J.M.A.Braga
- Scybalium jamaicense (Sw.) Schott & Endl.

== Basellaceae ==
- Anredera vesicaria (Lam.) C.F.Gaertn.

== Bataceae ==
- Batis maritima L.

== Begoniaceae ==
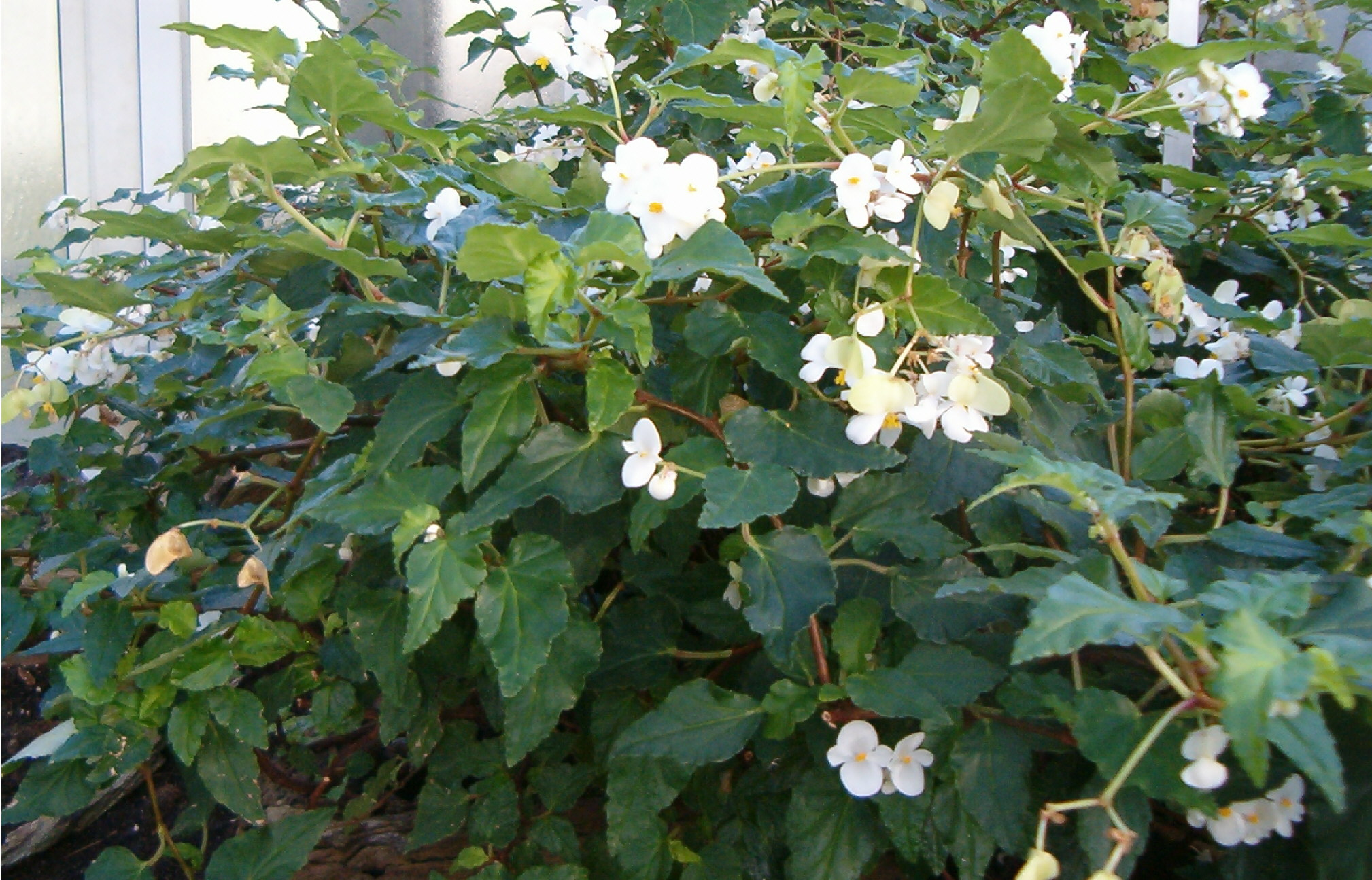
Begonia cubensis

- Begonia acutifolia Jacq.
- Begonia alcarrasica* J.Sierra
- Begonia banaoensis* J.Sierra
- Begonia bissei* J.Sierra
- † Begonia cowellii* Nash – Santiago de Cuba, Granma; last recorded in 1949
- Begonia cubensis* Hassk.
- Begonia fischeri Schrank
- Begonia glabra Aubl.
- Begonia leivae* J.Sierra
- Begonia libanensis* Urb.
- † Begonia linearifolia* J.Sierra
- Begonia lomensis* Britton & P.Wilson
- Begonia maestrensis* Urb. – southeastern Cuba
- Begonia wrightiana* A.DC. – Guantánamo

== Bignoniaceae ==
- Amphilophium crucigerum (L.) L.G.Lohmann
- Amphilophium gnaphalanthum* (A.Rich.) L.G.Lohmann
- Amphilophium lactiflorum (Vahl) L.G.Lohmann
- Amphitecna latifolia (Mill.) A.H.Gentry
- Bignonia aequinoctialis L.
- Bignonia diversifolia Kunth
- Bignonia neoheterophylla L.G.Lohmann
- Catalpa brevipes Urb.
- Catalpa macrocarpa (A.Rich.) Ekman ex Urb.
- Catalpa purpurea Griseb. – eastern Cuba and Haiti (Gonave I.)
- Crescentia cujete L.
- Crescentia mirabilis* Ekman ex Urb. – northeastern Cuba
- Dolichandra unguis-cati (L.) L.G.Lohmann
- Ekmanianthe actinophylla (Griseb.) Urb.
- Ekmanianthe longiflora* (Griseb.) Urb.
- Fridericia podopogon (DC.) L.G.Lohmann
- Handroanthus billbergii (Bureau & K.Schum.) S.O.Grose
- Jacaranda arborea* Urb.
- Jacaranda caerulea (L.) J.St.-Hil.
- Jacaranda cowellii* Britton & P.Wilson
- Spirotecoma apiculata* (Britton) Alain
- Spirotecoma holguinensis* (Britton) Alain
- Spirotecoma rubriflora (Leonard) Alain
- Spirotecoma spiralis* (C.Wright ex Griseb.) Pichon
- Tabebuia angustata Britton
- Tabebuia arimaoensis* Britton
- Tabebuia bahamensis (Northr.) Britton
- Tabebuia berteroi (DC.) Britton
- Tabebuia bibracteolata* (Griseb.) Britton
- Tabebuia brooksiana Britton
- Tabebuia calcicola Britton
- Tabebuia caleticana* A.H.Gentry & D.Albert
- Tabebuia clementis* Alain
- Tabebuia crispiflora Alain
- Tabebuia × del-riscoi* Borhidi (T. lepidophylla × T. heterophylla)
- Tabebuia densifolia Urb.
- Tabebuia dubia* (C.Wright) Britton ex Seibert
- Tabebuia elegans* Urb.
- Tabebuia elongata* Urb.
- Tabebuia glaucescens* Urb.
- Tabebuia gracilipes* Alain
- Tabebuia heterophylla (DC.) Britton
- Tabebuia hypoleuca* (C.Wright) Urb.
- Tabebuia inaequipes* Urb.
- Tabebuia jackiana* Ekman ex Urb.
- Tabebuia jaucoensis* Bisse
- Tabebuia lepidota (Kunth) Britton
- Tabebuia leptoneura* Urb.
- Tabebuia lepidophylla* (A.Rich.) Greenm.
- Tabebuia lepidota (Kunth) Britton
- Tabebuia leptoneura* Urb.
- Tabebuia linearis* Alain
- Tabebuia microphylla (Lam.) Urb.
- Tabebuia moaensis* Britton
- Tabebuia myrtifolia (Griseb.) Britton
- Tabebuia obovata Urb.
- Tabebuia × perelegans* Borhidi (T. elegans × T. heterophylla)
- Tabebuia pinetorum* Britton
- Tabebuia polymorpha* Urb.
- Tabebuia pulverulenta* Urb.
- Tabebuia sagrae* Urb.
- Tabebuia sauvallei* Britton
- Tabebuia shaferi* Britton
- Tabebuia simplicifolia* Carabia ex Alain
- Tabebuia trachycarpa* (Griseb.) K.Schum.
- Tecoma stans (L.) Juss. ex Kunth

== Bixaceae ==
- Cochlospermum vitifolium (Willd.) Spreng.

== Bonnetiaceae ==
- Bonnetia cubensis* (Britton) Howard – Bahia da Moa

== Boraginaceae ==
- Bourreria calophylla* (A.Rich.) Griseb. – western Cuba incl. I. de la Juventud
- Bourreria havanensis (Willd. ex Roem. & Schult.) Miers
- Bourreria linearis* Miers – eastern Cuba
- Bourreria microphylla* Griseb.
- Bourreria moaensis* Britton – eastern Cuba
- Bourreria polyneura* O.E.Schulz
- Bourreria succulenta Jacq.
- Bourreria tomentosa (Lam.) G.Don
- Bourreria virgata (Sw.) G.Don
- Cordia alliodora (Ruiz & Pav.) Oken
- Cordia collococca L.
- Cordia crispiflora* A.DC.
- Cordia curbeloi* Alain – eastern Cuba
- Cordia dentata Poir.
- Cordia dodecandra A.DC.
- Cordia dumosa* Alain – eastern Cuba
- Cordia galeottiana* A.Rich.
- Cordia gerascanthus L.
- Cordia leonis* (Britton & P.Wilson) Ekman – southeastern Cuba
- Cordia leucosebestena* Griseb. – eastern Cuba
- Cordia pulverulenta* (Urb.) Alain – southeastern Cuba
- Cordia sebestena L.
- Cordia sulcata A.DC.
- Cordia triangularis* Urb. – eastern Cuba
- Cordia valenzuelana* A.Rich. – western Cuba (Sierra de Rangel)
- Cordia vanhermannii* Alain – eastern Cuba
- Ehretia tinifolia L.
- Euploca antillana (Urb.) Diane & Hilger
- Euploca bursifera* (C.Wright ex Griseb.) Diane & Hilger
- Euploca fruticosa (L.) J.I.M.Melo & Semir
- Euploca humifusa (Kunth) Diane & Hilger
- Euploca humilis (L.) Feuillet
- Euploca hypogaea (Urb. & Ekman) Diane & Hilger
- Euploca microphylla (Sw. ex Wikstr.) Feuillet
- Euploca myriophylla* (Urb.) M.W.Frohl. & M.W.Chase
- Euploca procumbens (Mill.) Diane & Hilger
- Euploca serpylloides* (Griseb.) Diane & Hilger
- Heliotropium curassavicum L.
- Heliotropium earlei (Britton) Greuter, P.A.González & R.Rankin
- Heliotropium glabrum (L.) Feuillet
- Heliotropium laevigatum (Lam.) Feuillet
- Heliotropium lamarckii Feuillet
- Heliotropium roigii* (Britton) Feuillet
- Heliotropium verdcourtii Craven
- Myriopus maculatus (Jacq.) Feuillet
- Myriopus poliochros (Spreng.) Small
- Myriopus volubilis (L.) Small
- Nama cubana* P.Wilson
- Nama jamaicensis L.
- Rochefortia acanthophora (A.DC.) Griseb.
- Rochefortia cubensis* Britton & P.Wilson
- Rochefortia cuneata Sw.
- Rochefortia holguinensis* G.Klotz
- Rochefortia oblanceata* G.Klotz
- Rochefortia oblongata* Urb. & Ekman
- Rochefortia septentrionalis* G.Klotz
- Rochefortia stellata* Britton & P.Wilson
- Rochefortia victoriniana* G.Klotz
- Tournefortia gnaphalodes (L.) R.Br. ex Roem. & Schult.
- Varronia acunae* Moldenke – Sierra de Moa
- Varronia baracoensis* (Urb.) Borhidi – southeastern Cuba
- Varronia brittonii Millsp.
- Varronia cinerascens* (A.DC.) Borhidi – eastern Cuba
- Varronia corallicola* (Urb.) Borhidi – eastern Cuba
- Varronia curassavica Jacq.
- Varronia duartei* (Borhidi & O.Muñiz) Borhidi
- Varronia erythrococca* (Griseb.) Moldenke – eastern Cuba
- Varronia globosa Jacq.
- Varronia grisebachii* (Urb.) Moldenke
- Varronia holguinensis* (Borhidi & O.Muñiz) Borhidi
- Varronia iberica* (Urb.) Borhidi – eastern Cuba
- Varronia intricata* (C.Wright) Borhidi ex Feuillet – east-central Cuba
- Varronia lenis* (Alain) Borhidi – northwestern Cuba
- Varronia leptoclada* (Urb. & Britton) Millsp. – southeastern Cuba
- Varronia linnaei (Stearn) J.S.Mill.
- Varronia longipedunculata* Britton & P.Wilson – southeastern Cuba
- Varronia moensis* Moldenke – Sierra de Moa
- Varronia nipensis* (Urb. & Ekman) Borhidi – Sierra de Nipe
- Varronia pedunculosa* (Griseb.) Borhidi – northeastern Cuba
- Varronia sauvallei* (Urb.) Borhidi
- Varronia serrata (L.) Borhidi – eastern Cuba and Hispaniola
- Varronia shaferi* Britton – Sierra de Moa
- Varronia suffruticosa* (Borhidi) Borhidi
- Varronia toaensis* (Borhidi & O.Muñiz) Borhidi
- Varronia utermarkiana* (Borhidi) Borhidi
- Wigandia pruritiva Spreng.

== Brassicaceae ==
- Cakile lanceolata (Willd.) O.E.Schulz
- Lepidium virginicum L.
- Rorippa hispida (Desv.) Britton
  - Rorippa hispida subsp. glabra* (O.E.Schulz) Greuter & R.Rankin
- Rorippa portoricensis (Spreng.) Stehlé

== Bromeliaceae ==
- Aechmea nudicaulis (L.) Griseb.
- Billbergia pyramidalis (Sims) Lindl.
- Bromelia karatas L.
- Bromelia pinguin L.
- Catopsis berteroniana (Schult. & Schult.f.) Mez
- Catopsis floribunda L.B.Sm.
- Catopsis montana L.B.Sm
- Catopsis nitida (Hook.) Griseb.
- Catopsis nutans (Sw.) Griseb.
- Catopsis sessiliflora (Ruiz & Pav.) Mez
- Cipuropsis capituligera (Griseb.) Christenh. & Byng
- Guzmania erythrolepis Brongn. ex Planch.
- Guzmania lingulata (L.) Mez
- Guzmania monostachia (L.) Rusby ex Mez
- Pitcairnia cubensis* (Mez) L.B.Sm. – eastern Cuba
- Racinaea jenmanii (Baker) M.A.Spencer & L.B.Sm.
- Racinaea lescaillei (C.Wright) M.A.Spencer & L.B.Sm.
- Racinaea tetrantha (Ruiz & Pav.) M.A.Spencer & L.B.Sm.
- Tillandsia argentea Griseb.
- Tillandsia balbisiana Schult. & Schult.f.
- Tillandsia bulbosa Hook.
- Tillandsia canescens Sw.
- Tillandsia capitata Griseb.
- Tillandsia compacta Griseb.
- Tillandsia complanata Benth.
- Tillandsia compressa Bertero ex Schult. & Schult.f.
- Tillandsia deppeana Steud.
- Tillandsia didistichoides Mez
- Tillandsia excelsa Griseb.
- Tillandsia fasciculata Sw.
- Tillandsia fendleri Griseb.
- Tillandsia flexuosa Sw.
- Tillandsia hotteana Urb.
- Tillandsia juncea (Ruiz & Pav.) Poir.
- Tillandsia paucifolia Baker
- Tillandsia polystachia (L.) L.
- Tillandsia praschekii* Ehlers & Willinger
- Tillandsia pruinosa Sw.
- Tillandsia rangelensis Hechav.
- Tillandsia recurvata (L.) L.
- Tillandsia schiedeana Steud.
- Tillandsia setacea Sw.
- Tillandsia streptophylla Scheidw.
- Tillandsia tenuifolia L.
- Tillandsia turquinensis* K.Willinger & Michálek
- Tillandsia usneoides (L.) L.
- Tillandsia utriculata L.
- Tillandsia variabilis Schltdl.
- Vriesea dissitiflora* (C.Wright) Mez – western Cuba
- Vriesea incurva (Griseb.) Read
- Vriesea macrostachya (Bello) Mez
- Vriesea platynema Gaudich.
  - Vriesea platynema var. wrightii* (L.B.Sm.) L.B.Sm. – eastern Cuba
- Werauhia haplostachya (C.Wright) J.R.Grant – eastern Cuba
- Werauhia ringens (Griseb.) J.R.Grant
- Werauhia sanguinolenta (Cogn. & Marchal) J.R.Grant
- Werauhia sintenisii (Baker) J.R.Grant
- Wittmackia penduliflora (A.Rich.) Aguirre-Santoro

== Brunelliaceae ==
- Brunellia comocladiifolia Bonpl.
  - Brunellia comocladiifolia subsp. cubensis* Cuatrec. – eastern Cuba

== Burmanniaceae ==
- Apteria aphylla (Nutt.) Barnhart ex Small
- Burmannia bicolor Mart.
- Burmannia biflora L.
- Burmannia capitata (Walter ex J.F.Gmel.) Mart.
- Burmannia flava Mart.
- Gymnosiphon niveus (Griseb.) Urb.
- Gymnosiphon sphaerocarpus Urb.
- Gymnosiphon urbani (Goebel & Suess.) V.Merckx & Byng

== Burseraceae ==
- Bursera angustata* C.Wright ex Griseb. – western Cuba
- Bursera gibarensis* M.C.Martínez, Daly & J.Pérez – Holguín
- Bursera glauca Griseb.
- Bursera inaguensis Britton – Bahamas (Great Inagua) and central Cuba
- Bursera shaferi (Britton & P.Wilson) Urb. – central Cuba
- Bursera simaruba (L.) Sarg.
- Bursera yaterensis* M.C.Martínez, Daly & J.Pérez
- Protium balsamiferum (Sw.) Daly & P.Fine
- Protium baracoense* Bisse
- Protium cubense* (Rose) Urb.
- Protium fragrans* (Rose) Urb.
- Protium maestrense* Bisse – southeastern Cuba
- Protium subacuminatum* Swart

== Buxaceae ==
- Buxus acuminata* (Griseb.) Müll.Arg. – southeastern Cuba
- Buxus acunae* Borhidi & O.Muñiz – southeastern Cuba
- Buxus aneura* Urb. – southeastern Cuba
- Buxus bahamensis Baker – Bahamas, Turks and Caicos, and northern Cuba
- Buxus bissei* Eg.Köhler - southeastern Cuba
- Buxus braimbridgeorum* Eg.Köhler – eastern Cuba
- Buxus brevipes* (Müll.Arg.) Urb. – western Cuba
- Buxus crassifolia* (Britton) Urb. – southeastern Cuba
- Buxus cristalensis* Eg.Köhler & P.A.González – eastern Cuba
- Buxus cubana* (A.Rich.) Baill. – southeastern Cuba
- Buxus ekmanii* Urb. – southeastern Cuba
- Buxus excisa* Urb. – southeastern Cuba
- Buxus foliosa* (Britton) Urb. – southeastern Cuba
- Buxus glomerata (Griseb.) Müll.Arg
- Buxus gonoclada* (C.Wright ex Griseb.) Müll.Arg.
- Buxus imbricata* Urb. – southeastern Cuba
- Buxus jaucoensis* Eg.Köhler – southeastern Cuba
- Buxus koehleri* P.A.González & Borsch
- Buxus leivae* Eg.Köhler – southeastern Cuba
- Buxus macrophylla* (Britton) Fawc. & Rendle
- Buxus marginalis* (Britton) Urb. – southeastern Cuba
- Buxus moana* Alain – eastern Cuba
- Buxus muelleriana* Urb. – southeastern Cuba
- Buxus nipensis* Eg.Köhler & P.A.González – eastern Cuba
- Buxus olivacea* Urb. – southeastern Cuba
- Buxus pilosula* Urb. – southeastern Cuba
- Buxus pseudaneura* Eg.Köhler – southeastern Cuba
- Buxus retusa* (Griseb.) Müll.Arg. – eastern Cuba
- Buxus revoluta* (Britton) Mathou – southeastern Cuba
- Buxus rheedioides* Urb. – southeastern Cuba
- Buxus rotundifolia* (Britton) Mathou – southeastern Cuba
- Buxus sclerophylla* Eg.Köhler – southeastern Cuba
- Buxus serpentinicola* Eg.Köhler – southeastern Cuba
- Buxus shaferi* (Britton) Urb. – eastern Cuba
- Buxus triptera* Eg.Köhler – southeastern Cuba
- Buxus vaccinioides* (Britton) Urb. – southeastern Cuba
- Buxus wrightii* Müll.Arg. – western Cuba
- Buxus yunquensis* Eg.Köhler – southeastern Cuba

== Cabombaceae ==
- Brasenia schreberi J.F.Gmel.
- Cabomba furcata Schult. & Schult.f.
- Cabomba haynesii Wiersema

== Cactaceae ==
- Acanthocereus tetragonus (L.) Hummelinck
- Consolea macracantha (Griseb.) A.Berger
- Consolea moniliformis (L.) A.Berger – southeastern Cuba, Hispaniola, and Puerto Rico (Mona I. and Desecheo I.)
- Cylindropuntia hystrix* (Griseb.) Areces
- Harrisia earlei* Britton & Rose – western Cuba
- Harrisia eriophora* (Pfeiff.) Britton – western and central Cuba
- Harrisia fernowii* Britton – eastern Cuba
- Harrisia taetra* Areces – western Cuba
- Leptocereus arboreus* Britton & Rose
- Leptocereus assurgens* (C.Wright ex Griseb.) Britton & Rose – western Cuba
- Leptocereus carinatus* Areces
- Leptocereus leonii Britton & Rose – Cuba and Cayman Islands
- Leptocereus nudiflorus* (Engelm. ex C.Wright) D.Barrios & S.Arias
- Leptocereus scopulophilus* Areces
- Leptocereus sylvestris* Britton & Rose
- Leptocereus wrightii* León – northwestern Cuba
- Leuenbergeria zinniiflora* (DC.) Lodé
- Mammillaria prolifera (Mill.) Haw.
- Melocactus acunae* León – eastern Cuba
- Melocactus curvispinus Pfeiff.
  - Melocactus curvispinus subsp. guitartii* (León) Lodé
- Melocactus evae* Z.Mészáros – southeastern Cuba
- Melocactus harlowii* (Britton & Rose) Vaupel – southeastern Cuba
- Melocactus holguinensis* Areces
- Melocactus lagunaensis* (Z.Mészáros) D.Barrios & Majure – southeastern Cuba
- Melocactus matanzanus* León
- Melocactus nagyi* Z.Mészáros – southeastern Cuba
- Melocactus perezassoi* Areces – central Cuba
- Melocactus radoczii* Z.Mészáros – southeastern Cuba
- Melocactus santiagoensis* D.Barrios & Majure
- Opuntia auberi Pfeiff.
- Opuntia cubensis* Britton & Rose
- Opuntia dejecta Salm-Dyck
- Opuntia militaris* Britton & Rose
- Pelecyphora cubensis* (Britton & Rose) D.Aquino & Dan.Sánchez
- Pilosocereus brooksianus (Britton & Rose) Byles & G.D.Rowley – southeastern Cuba
- Pilosocereus millspaughii (Britton) Byles & G.D.Rowley
- Pilosocereus robinii (Lem.) Byles & G.D.Rowley
- Rhipsalis baccifera (J.S.Muell.) Stearn
- Selenicereus grandiflorus (L.) Britton & Rose
- Selenicereus pteranthus (Link ex A.Dietr.) Britton & Rose
- Selenicereus triangularis (L.) D.R.Hunt
- Stenocereus heptagonus (L.) Mottram

== Calophyllaceae ==
- Calophyllum pinetorum* Bisse – western Cuba
- Calophyllum rivulare* Bisse – eastern Cuba
- Calophyllum utile* Bisse – eastern Cuba
- Mammea americana L.
- Marila dissitiflora* C.Wright

== Campanulaceae ==
- Lobelia assurgens L.
- Lobelia cacuminis* Britton & P.Wilson
- Lobelia cliffortiana L.
- Lobelia cubana* Urb.
- Lobelia imberbis* (Griseb.) Urb.
- Lobelia oxyphylla* Urb.
- Lobelia robusta Graham
- Lobelia salicina Lam.
- Lobelia shaferi* Urb.
- Siphocampylus baracoensis* Vict.
- Siphocampylus cernuus* Griseb.
- Siphocampylus glaber* McVaugh
- Siphocampylus manettiiflorus* Hook.
- Siphocampylus patens* Griseb.
- Siphocampylus ruber* Alain
- Siphocampylus subglaber* Urb.
- Siphocampylus yumuriensis* Vict.

== Canellaceae ==
- Canella winterana (L.) Gaertn.
- Cinnamodendron cubense* Urb.

== Cannabaceae ==
- Celtis berteroana Urb.
- Celtis iguanaea (Jacq.) Sarg.
- Celtis trinervia Lam.
- Trema cubense* Urb.
- Trema lamarckianum (Schult.) Blume
- Trema micranthum (L.) Blume

== Cannaceae ==
- Trema micranthum (L.) Blume
- Canna indica L.

== Capparaceae ==
- Crateva urbaniana R.Rankin
- Morisonia cynophallophora (L.) Christenh. & Byng
- Morisonia domingensis (Spreng. ex DC.) Christenh. & Byng
- Morisonia ferruginea (L.) Christenh. & Byng
- Morisonia flexuosa L.
- Morisonia frondosa (Jacq.) Christenh. & Byng
- Morisonia singularis* (R.Rankin) Christenh. & Byng – southeastern Cuba

== Caprifoliaceae ==
- Valeriana candolleana Gardner
- Valeriana scandens L.

== Caryophyllaceae ==
- Arenaria lanuginosa (Michx.) Rohrb.
- Drymaria cubana* Alain
- Drymaria ortegioides* Griseb.
- Stipulicida lacerata (C.W.James) D.B.Poind., K.E.Benn. & Weakley – I. de la Juventud and Florida

== Celastraceae ==
- Crossopetalum aquifolium (Griseb.) Hitchc.
- Crossopetalum coriaceum Northr. – Bahamas and Cuba (Cayo Sabinal)
- Crossopetalum cristalense* Borhidi – eastern Cuba
- Crossopetalum ekmanii* (Urb.) Alain – central Cuba
- Crossopetalum ilicifolium (Poir.) Kuntze
- Crossopetalum orientale* Mory
- Crossopetalum pungens* (C.Wright) Rothm. – eastern Cuba
- Crossopetalum rhacoma Crantz
- Crossopetalum rostratum* (Urb.) Rothm. – western and central Cuba
- Crossopetalum shaferi* (Britton & Urb.) Alain – Sierra de Moa
- Crossopetalum ternifolium* (Urb.) Alain – eastern Cuba
- Crossopetalum uragoga (Jacq.) Kuntze
- Cuervea integrifolia* (A.Rich.) A.C.Sm.
- Elaeodendron nipense* Bisse – eastern Cuba
- Elaeodendron xylocarpum (Vent.) DC.
- Gyminda latifolia (Sw.) Urb.
- Gyminda orbicularis* Borhidi & O.Muñiz
- Maytenus buxifolia (A.Rich.) Griseb.
  - Maytenus buxifolia subsp. monticola* Borhidi & O.Muñiz
- Maytenus cajalbanica* (Borhidi & O.Muñiz) Borhidi & O.Muñiz
- Maytenus cochlearifolia* Griseb.
- Maytenus elaeodendroides* Griseb.
- † Maytenus lineata* C.Wright ex Griseb. – Pinar del Río: northwest of Bahía Honda
- Maytenus loeseneri* Urb.
- Maytenus maestrensis* Urb. – southeastern Cuba
- Maytenus phyllanthoides Benth.
- Maytenus revoluta* Alain
- Maytenus saxicola* Britton & P.Wilson
- Maytenus serpentini* (Borhidi & O.Muñiz) Borhidi & O.Muñiz
- Maytenus splendens* Urb.
- Maytenus urquiolae* Mory
- Pristimera coriacea* (C.Wright ex Griseb.) Miers
- Salacia wrightii* Urb.
- Schaefferia ephedroides Urb.
- Schaefferia frutescens Jacq.
- Schaefferia marchii Griseb. ex Urb.
- Torralbasia cuneifolia (C.Wright ex A.Gray) Krug & Urb.
  - Torralbasia cuneifolia var. rotundata* Borhidi
  - Torralbasia cuneifolia subsp. verrucosa* Borhidi

== Ceratophyllaceae ==
- Ceratophyllum australe Griseb.
- Ceratophyllum demersum L.

== Cephaloziaceae ==
- Nowellia wrightii*

== Chloranthaceae ==
- Hedyosmum domingense Urb.
  - Hedyosmum domingense var. cubense* (Urb.) Todzia & C.E.Wood
- Hedyosmum grisebachii* Solms
- Hedyosmum nutans Sw.
- Hedyosmum subintegrum* Urb.

== Chrysobalanaceae ==
- Chrysobalanus icaco L.
- Hirtella americana L.
- Hirtella triandra Sw.

== Cistaceae ==
- Lechea cubensis* Legg.

== Cleomaceae ==
- Cleome guianensis Aubl.
- Cleome houstonii* R.Br.
- Cleome macrorhiza* C.Wright – southwestern Cuba
- Cleome procumbens Jacq.
- Cleome serrata Jacq.
- Cleome spinosa Jacq.

== Clethraceae ==
- Clethra cubensis* A.Rich. – eastern Cuba
- Purdiaea bissei* Berazaín
- Purdiaea cubensis* (A.Rich.) Urb.
- Purdiaea microphylla* Britton & P.Wilson
- Purdiaea moaensis* Vict.
- Purdiaea nipensis* Vict. & León
- Purdiaea ophiticola* Vict.
- Purdiaea parvifolia* (Vict.) J.L.Thomas
- Purdiaea shaferi* Britton & P.Wilson
- Purdiaea stenopetala* Griseb.
- Purdiaea velutina* Britton & F.Wilson

== Clusiaceae ==
- Clusia alainii* Borhidi
- Clusia brittonii* Alain – western Cuba
- Clusia callosa* Britton & P.Wilson – Sierra de Moa
- Clusia clusioides (Griseb.) D'Arcy – eastern Cuba, Hispaniola, and Puerto Rico
- Clusia minor L.
- Clusia moaensis* Borhidi & O.Muñiz – eastern Cuba
- Clusia monocarpa* Urb. – eastern Cuba
- Clusia nipensis* Borhidi – eastern Cuba
- Clusia rosea Jacq.
- Clusia tetrastigma* Vesque – eastern Cuba
- Garcinia aristata (Griseb.) Borhidi
- Garcinia bakeriana* (Urb.) Borhidi
- Garcinia cincta* (Urb.) Borhidi
- Garcinia clarensis* Borhidi
- Garcinia cubensis* (Borhidi) Borhidi
- Garcinia moaensis* (Bisse) Borhidi – eastern Cuba
- Garcinia ophiticola* (Borhidi) Borhidi
- Garcinia polyneura* (Urb.) Borhidi
- Garcinia pungens* Borhidi
- Garcinia revoluta* (Urb.) Borhidi
- Garcinia ruscifolia* (Griseb.) Borhidi – eastern Cuba
- Garcinia serpentini* Borhidi

== Combretaceae ==
- Combretum laxum Jacq.
- Combretum spinosum Bonpl.
- Conocarpus erectus L.
- Laguncularia racemosa (L.) C.F.Gaertn.
- Terminalia aroldoi* Bisse
- Terminalia bipleura (Borhidi & O.Muñiz
- Terminalia buceras (L.) C.Wright (synonym Bucida ophiticola* Bisse)
- Terminalia diptera* (Sagra) Greuter & R.Rankin
- Terminalia eriostachya* A.Rich.
- Terminalia maestrensis* Bisse – southeastern Cuba
- Terminalia neglecta* Bisse
- Terminalia nipensis* Alain
- Terminalia orientensis* Monach.
- Terminalia pachystyla* Borhidi
- Terminalia tetraphylla (Aubl.) Gere & Boatwr.

== Commelinaceae ==
- Callisia cordifolia (Sw.) Andiers. & Woodson
- Callisia monandra (Sw.) Schult. & Schult.f.
- Callisia repens (Jacq.) L.
- Commelina erecta L.
- Commelina leiocarpa Benth.
- Commelina rufipes Seub.
- Gibasis geniculata (Jacq.) Rohweder
- Gibasis pauciflora* (Urb. & Ekman) D.R.Hunt – eastern Cuba
- † Sauvallia* C.Wright ex Hassk.
  - † Sauvallia blainii* C.Wright ex Hassk. – western Cuba (Pinar del Río: Lomas del Rangel); last recorded in 1867
- Tradescantia virginiana L.
- Tradescantia zanonia (L.) Sw.

== Connaraceae ==
- Cnestidium rufescens Planch.
- Connarus reticulatus* Griseb. – eastern Cuba
- Rourea glabra Kunth
- Rourea surinamensis Miq.

== Convolvulaceae ==
- Aniseia martinicensis (Jacq.) Choisy
- Cuscuta americana L.
- Cuscuta campestris Yunck.
- Cuscuta globulosa Benth.
- Cuscuta indecora Choisy
- Cuscuta obtusiflora Kunth
- Cuscuta umbellata Kunth
- Decalobanthus discoidespermus (Donn.Sm.) Staples
- Dichondra micrantha Urb.
- Distimake aegyptius (L.) A.R.Simões & Staples
- Distimake cissoides (Lam.) A.R.Simões & Staples
- Distimake dissectus (Jacq.) A.R.Simões & Staples
- Distimake quinquefolius (L.) A.R.Simões & Staples
- Distimake tuberosus (L.) A.R.Simões & Staples
- Evolvulus alsinoides (L.) L.
- Evolvulus arbuscula Poir.
- Evolvulus bracei House
- Evolvulus convolvuloides (Willd. ex Schult.) Stearn
- Evolvulus grisebachii Peter – western Cuba and Florida
- Evolvulus minimus* Ooststr.
- Evolvulus nummularius (L.) L.
- Evolvulus sericeus Sw.
- Evolvulus siliceus* Britton & P.Wilson – I. de la Juventud
- Ipomoea alba L.
- Ipomoea alterniflora* Griseb. – western and central Cuba
- Ipomoea argentifolia* A.Rich. – Cuba incl. I. de la Juventud
- Ipomoea asarifolia (Desr.) Roem. & Schult.
- Ipomoea balioclada* Urb. – southeastern Cuba
- Ipomoea calophylla* C.Wright ex Griseb. – western Cuba
- Ipomoea carolina L. – Cuba and Bahamas
- Ipomoea clarensis* Alain – central Cuba
- Ipomoea corymbosa (L.) Roth
- Ipomoea cubensis* (House) Urb. – western Cuba
- Ipomoea erosa* Urb. – Sierra de Nipe
- Ipomoea falkioides* Griseb.
- Ipomoea fuchsioides* Griseb. – western Cuba incl. I. de la Juventud
- Ipomoea hederifolia L.
- Ipomoea heptaphylla Sweet
- Ipomoea hypargyrea* Griseb. – eastern Cuba
- Ipomoea imperati (Vahl) Griseb.
- Ipomoea incerta* (Britton) Urb. – Holguín
- Ipomoea indica (Burm.) Merr.
- Ipomoea jalapa (L.) Pursh
- Ipomoea jalapoides* Griseb. – western Cuba
- Ipomoea lindmanii* Urb. – eastern Cuba
- Ipomoea longeramosa Choisy
- Ipomoea merremioides* Alain – Sierra de Cristal
- Ipomoea meyeri (Spreng.) G.Don –
- Ipomoea microdactyla Griseb.
- Ipomoea microdonta* J.R.I.Wood & Scotland – central Cuba
- Ipomoea montecristina* Hadac – southeastern Cuba
- Ipomoea nil (L.) Roth
- Ipomoea passifloroides House – southeastern Cuba and Cayman Islands
- Ipomoea pes-caprae (L.) R.Br.
- Ipomoea praecox* C.Wright – western Cuba
- Ipomoea racemosa Poir.
- Ipomoea robusta* Urb.
- Ipomoea sagittata Poir.
- Ipomoea setifera Poir.
- Ipomoea subrevoluta* Choisy – I. de la Juventud
- Ipomoea tenuissima Choisy
- Ipomoea tiliacea (Willd.) Choisy
- Ipomoea trifida (Kunth) G.Don
- Ipomoea triloba L.
- Ipomoea violacea L.
- Jacquemontia cayensis Britton
- Jacquemontia evolvuloides (Moric.) Meisn.
- Jacquemontia havanensis (Jacq.) Urb.
- Jacquemontia nipensis Alain
- Jacquemontia nodiflora (Desr.) G.Don
- Jacquemontia obcordata (Millsp.) House
- Jacquemontia pentanthos (Jacq.) G.Don
- Jacquemontia serpyllifolia* (Kunth) Urb.
- Jacquemontia tamnifolia (L.) Griseb.
- Jacquemontia verticillata (L.) Urb.
- Operculina hamiltonii (G.Don) D.F.Austin & Staples

== Costaceae ==
- Costus spicatus (Jacq.) Sw.

== Cucurbitaceae ==
- Cayaponia americana (Lam.) Cogn.
- Cayaponia racemosa (Mill.) Cogn.
- Cionosicys excisus (Griseb.) C.Jeffrey
- Cionosicys pomiformis Griseb.
- Cyclanthera carthagenensis (Jacq.) H.Schaef. & S.S.Renner
- Fevillea cordifolia L.
- Melothria pendula L.
- Psiguria pedata (L.) R.A.Howard
- Sicana sphaerica Hook.f.
- Sicydium tamnifolium (Kunth) Cogn.

== Cunoniaceae ==
- Weinmannia pinnata L.

== Cupressaceae ==
- Juniperus barbadensis L.
- Juniperus saxicola* Britton & P.Wilson

== Cyatheaceae ==
- Alsophila balanocarpa* (D.C.Eaton) D.S.Conant
- Alsophila × boytelii* Caluff & Shelton (A. balanaocarpa × A. woodwardioides)
- Alsophila brooksii (Maxon) R.M.Tryon
- Alsophila cubensis* (Underw. ex Maxon) Caluff & Shelton
- Alsophila × fagildei* Caluff & Shelton (A. minor × A. woodwardioides)
- Alsophila major* Caluff & Shelton
- Alsophila × medinae* Caluff & Shelton (A. balanaocarpa × A. cubensis)
- Alsophila minor (D.C.Eaton) R.M.Tryon
- Alsophila woodwardioides (Kaulf.) D.S.Conant
- Culcita coniifolia (Hook.) Maxon
- Cyathea × acunae* (Caluff & Shelton) C.Sánchez (C. aspera × C. horrida) – western Cuba
- Cyathea arborea (L.) Sm.
- Cyathea armata Domin
- Cyathea caracasana (Klotzsch) Domin
- Cyathea furfuracea Baker
- Cyathea horrida (L.) Sm.
- Cyathea microdonta (Desv.) Domin
- Cyathea myosuroides (Liebm.) Domin
- Cyathea parvula (Jenman) Proctor
- Cyathea × sessilifolia (Jenman) Proctor
- Cyathea strigillosa* (Maxon) Domin
- Cyathea tenera (J.Sm.) T.Moore
- Lophosoria quadripinnata (J.F.Gmel.) C.Chr.
- Plagiogyria pectinata (Liebm.) Lellinger
- Sphaeropteris insignis (D.C.Eaton) R.M.Tryon

== Cyclanthaceae ==
- Thoracocarpus bissectus (Vell.) Harling

== Cymodoceaceae ==
- Halodule wrightii Asch.
- Syringodium filiforme Kütz.

== Cyperaceae ==
- Abildgaardia ovata (Burm.f.) Kral
- Bolboschoenus maritimus (L.) Palla
- Bulbostylis capillaris (L.) Kunth ex C.B.Clarke
- Bulbostylis ciliatifolia (Elliott) Fernald
- Bulbostylis floccosa (Griseb.) C.B.Clarke
- Bulbostylis junciformis (Kunth) C.B.Clarke
- Bulbostylis juncoides (Vahl) Kük. ex Herter
- Bulbostylis paradoxa (Spreng.) Lindm.
- Bulbostylis pauciflora (Liebm.) C.B.Clarke
- Bulbostylis setacea (Griseb.) Svenson
- Bulbostylis stenocarpa Kük.
- Bulbostylis stenophylla (Elliott) C.B.Clarke
- Bulbostylis subaphylla C.B.Clarke
- Bulbostylis tenuifolia (Rudge) J.F.Macbr.
- Bulbostylis vestita (Kunth) C.B.Clarke
- Carex cubensis Kük. – eastern Cuba and Haiti
- Carex ekmanii Kük.
- Carex hamata Sw.
- Carex polystachya Sw. ex Wahlenb.
- Carex scabrella Wahlenb.
- Cladium mariscus (L.) Pohl
- Cyperus affinis Roem. & Schult.
- Cyperus aggregatus (Willd.) Endl.
- Cyperus amabilis Vahl
- Cyperus antillanus* (Kük.) O'Neill – west-central Cuba
- Cyperus articulatus L.
- Cyperus blepharoleptos Steud.
- Cyperus brevifolius (Rottb.) Hassk.
- Cyperus brunneus Sw.
- Cyperus camagueyensis* Britton – east-central Cuba
- Cyperus compressus L.
- Cyperus confertus Sw.
- Cyperus conglobatus Humb. ex Link
- Cyperus constanzae Urb.
- Cyperus corymbosus Rottb.
- Cyperus croceus Vahl
- Cyperus cuspidatus Kunth
- Cyperus digitatus Roxb.
- Cyperus ekmanii* Kük. – central and eastern Cuba
- Cyperus elegans L.
- Cyperus entrerianus Boeckeler
- Cyperus esculentus L.
- Cyperus ferax Rich.
- Cyperus filiformis Sw.
- Cyperus flavescens L.
- Cyperus floridanus Britton
- Cyperus fugax Liebm.
- Cyperus fuligineus Chapm.
- Cyperus gardneri Nees
- Cyperus giganteus Vahl
- Cyperus haspan L.
- Cyperus hermaphroditus (Jacq.) Standl.
- Cyperus hortensis (Salzm. ex Steud.) Dorr
- Cyperus humilis Kunth
- Cyperus imbricatus Retz.
- Cyperus lacunosus* Griseb. – western Cuba
- Cyperus laevigatus L.
- Cyperus lanceolatus Poir.
- Cyperus laxus Lam.
- Cyperus lentiginosus Millsp. & Chase
- Cyperus ligularis L.
- Cyperus luzulae (L.) Retz.
- Cyperus nanus Willd.
- Cyperus neourbanii* Kük. – western Cuba
- Cyperus ochraceus Vahl
- Cyperus odoratus L.
- Cyperus ovatus Baldwin
- Cyperus pinetorum Britton – I. de la Juventud
- Cyperus planifolius Rich.
- Cyperus polystachyos Rottb.
- Cyperus salzmannianus (Steud.) Bauters
- Cyperus sellowianus (Kunth) T.Koyama
- Cyperus sesquiflorus (Torr.) Mattf. & Kük.
- Cyperus sphacelatus Rottb.
- Cyperus squarrosus L.
- Cyperus strigosus L.
- Cyperus strongii G.C.Tucker & Gandhi
- Cyperus subtenuis (Kük.) M.T.Strong
- Cyperus surinamensis Rottb.
- Cyperus swartzii (A.Dietr.) Boeckeler ex Kük.
- Cyperus tenuis Sw.
- Cyperus thyrsiflorus Jungh.
- Cyperus unioloides R.Br.
- Cyperus virens Michx.
- Diplacrum capitatum (Willd.) Boeckeler
- Eleocharis acutangula (Roxb.) Schult.
- Eleocharis alveolata Svenson – western Cuba and northern Honduras
- Eleocharis atropurpurea (Retz.) J.Presl & C.Presl
- Eleocharis cellulosa Torr.
- Eleocharis confervoides (Poir.) Steud.
- Eleocharis elegans Kunth) Roem. & Schult.
- Eleocharis fallax Weath.
- Eleocharis filiculmis Kunth
- Eleocharis flavescens (Poir.) Urb.
- Eleocharis geniculata (L.) Roem. & Schult.
- Eleocharis grisea* Kük. – I. de la Juventud
- Eleocharis interstincta (Vahl) Roem. & Schult.
- Eleocharis knutei* Pabón & Zavaro
- Eleocharis microcarpa Torr.
- Eleocharis microlepis (Griseb.) D.A.Simpson
- Eleocharis minima Kunth
- Eleocharis minutissima Britton
- Eleocharis montana (Kunth) Roem. & Schult.
- Eleocharis mutata (L.) Roem. & Schult.
- Eleocharis nana Kunth
- Eleocharis nigrescens (Nees) Kunth
- Eleocharis oligantha C.B.Clarke
- Eleocharis parvula (Roem. & Schult.) Link ex Bluff
- Eleocharis plicarhachis (Griseb.) Svenson
- Eleocharis retroflexa (Poir.) Urb.
  - Eleocharis retroflexa subsp. depressa* Zavaro & Pabón
- Eleocharis rostellata (Torr.) Torr.
- Eleocharis setifolia (A.Rich.) J.Raynal
- Fimbristylis autumnalis (L.) Roem. & Schult.
- Fimbristylis caroliniana (Lam.) Fernald
- Fimbristylis complanata (Retz.) Link
- Fimbristylis cymosa R.Br.
- Fimbristylis dichotoma (L.) Vahl
  - Fimbristylis dichotoma subsp. ophiticola* (Britton) Zavaro
- Fimbristylis ferruginea (L.) Vahl
- Fimbristylis inaguensis Britton
- Fimbristylis littoralis Gaudich.
- Fimbristylis spadicea (L.) Vahl
- Fuirena breviseta (Coville) Coville
- Fuirena camptotricha C.Wright
- Fuirena robusta Kunth
- Fuirena scirpoidea Michx.
- Fuirena simplex Vahl
- Fuirena squarrosa Michx.
- Fuirena umbellata Rottb.
- Krenakia cubensis* (Kük.) S.M.Costa
- Lagenocarpus guianensis Nees
- Lagenocarpus rigidus (Kunth) Nees
- Machaerina cubensis (Kük.) T.Koyama – eastern Cuba and Hispaniola
- Machaerina effusa (Griseb.) M.T.Strong
- Machaerina filifolia* Griseb. – eastern Cuba
- Machaerina restioides (Sw.) Vahl
- Rhynchospora aristata Boeckeler
- Rhynchospora barbata (Vahl) Kunth
- Rhynchospora berteroi (Spreng.) C.B.Clarke
- Rhynchospora biflora Boeckeler
- Rhynchospora brachychaeta C.Wright
- Rhynchospora brevifoliata* (Kük.) Greuter & R.Rankin – eastern Cuba
- Rhynchospora brevirostris Griseb.
- Rhynchospora brittonii Gale
- Rhynchospora bucherorum* León – eastern Cuba
- Rhynchospora careyana Fernald
- Rhynchospora cephalotes (L.) Vahl
- Rhynchospora cephalotoides* Griseb. – eastern Cuba
- Rhynchospora cernua* Griseb.
- Rhynchospora colorata (L.) H.Pfeiff.
- Rhynchospora comata (Link) Schult.
- Rhynchospora corniculata (Lam.) A.Gray
- Rhynchospora corymbosa (L.) Britton
- Rhynchospora crispa* Gale – eastern Cuba
- Rhynchospora cubensis A.Rich.
- Rhynchospora depressa (Kük.) Gale – eastern Cuba
- Rhynchospora diodon (Nees) Griseb.
- Rhynchospora divergens Chapm. ex M.A.Curtis
- Rhynchospora domingensis Urb. – eastern Cuba, Hispaniola, and west-central Puerto Rico
- Rhynchospora exaltata Kunth
- Rhynchospora eximia (Nees) Boeckeler
- Rhynchospora fascicularis (Michx.) Vahl
- Rhynchospora filifolia A.Gray
- Rhynchospora filiformis Vahl
- Rhynchospora gageri* Britton
- Rhynchospora galeana Naczi, W.M.Knapp & G.Moor
- Rhynchospora gigantea Link
- Rhynchospora globosa (Kunth) Roem. & Schult.
  - Rhynchospora globosa var. tenuifolia* León – I. de la Juventud
- Rhynchospora globularis (Chapm.) Small
- Rhynchospora grayi Kunth
- Rhynchospora hirsuta (Vahl) Vahl
- Rhynchospora hispidula* Griseb. – western Cuba
- Rhynchospora holoschoenoides (Rich.) Herter
- Rhynchospora intermedia (Chapm.) Britton
- Rhynchospora intermixta C.Wright
- Rhynchospora joveroensis* Britton – western Cuba
- Rhynchospora leptorhyncha* C.Wright – western Cuba
- Rhynchospora lindeniana Griseb.
- Rhynchospora marisculus Lindl. & Nees
- Rhynchospora mayarensis* León – eastern Cuba
- Rhynchospora microcarpa Baldwin ex A.Gray
- Rhynchospora microcephala (Britton) Britton
- Rhynchospora miliacea (Lam.) A.Gray
- Rhynchospora nervosa (Vahl) Boeckeler
- Rhynchospora nipensis* Britton – eastern Cuba (Sierra de Nipe)
- Rhynchospora nitens (Vahl) A.Gray
- Rhynchospora nuda* Gale – I. de la Juventud
- Rhynchospora odorata C.Wright ex Griseb.
- Rhynchospora perplexa Britton
- Rhynchospora pleiantha (Kük.) Gale
- Rhynchospora plumosa Elliott
- Rhynchospora polyphylla (Vahl) Vahl
- Rhynchospora pruinosa* Griseb.
- Rhynchospora pura (Nees) Griseb.
- Rhynchospora racemosa C.Wright
- Rhynchospora radicans (Schltdl. & Cham.) H.Pfeiff.
- Rhynchospora rariflora (Michx.) Elliott
- Rhynchospora recognita (Gale) Kral
- Rhynchospora robusta (Kunth) Boeckeler
- Rhynchospora rugosa (Vahl) Gale
- Rhynchospora scabrata* Griseb. – eastern Cuba (Sierra de Nipe)
- Rhynchospora schmidtii* Kük. – western Cuba
- Rhynchospora scirpoides (Torr.) Griseb.
- Rhynchospora scutellata Griseb.
- Rhynchospora seslerioides* Griseb.
- Rhynchospora shaferi* Britton – eastern Cuba (Sierra de Nipe)
- Rhynchospora siguaneana* Britton – I. de la Juventud
- Rhynchospora simplex (Kük.) Kük.
- Rhynchospora sola* Gale – western Cuba and southeastern Mexico
- Rhynchospora squamulosa* Kük. – western Cuba
- Rhynchospora subimberbis* Griseb. – western Cuba
- Rhynchospora subsetigera* H.Pfeiff. – eastern Cuba
- Rhynchospora tenerrima Nees ex Spreng.
- Rhynchospora tenuifolia Griseb.
- Rhynchospora tenuis Link
- Rhynchospora tracyi Britton
- Rhynchospora triflora Vahl
- Rhynchospora trispicata (Nees) Schrad. ex Steud.
- Rhynchospora velutina (Kunth) Boeckeler
- Rhynchospora wrightiana Boeckeler
- Schoenoplectus americanus (Pers.) Volkart
- Schoenoplectus tabernaemontani (C.C.Gmel.) Palla
- Schoenus nigricans L.
- Scleria baldwinii (Torr.) Steud.
- Scleria bellii LeBlond
- Scleria chlorantha Boeckeler
- Scleria ciliata Michx.
- Scleria distans Poir.
- Scleria eggersiana Boeckeler
- Scleria gaertneri Raddi
- Scleria georgiana Core
- Scleria havanensis Britton
- Scleria hirtella Sw.
- Scleria interrupta Rich.
- Scleria lacustris C.Wright
- Scleria lithosperma (L.) Sw.
- Scleria macrophylla J.Presl & C.Presl
- Scleria microcarpa Nees ex Kunth
- Scleria mitis P.J.Bergius
- Scleria mucronata Poir.
- Scleria muehlenbergii Steud.
- Scleria pauciflora Muhl. ex Willd.
- Scleria pilosissima* Britton – eastern Cuba (Sierra de Nipe)
- Scleria scabra Willd.
- Scleria secans (L.) Urb.
- Scleria setulosociliata Boeckeler
- Scleria tenella Kunth
- Scleria testacea Nees ex Kunth
- Scleria verticillata Muhl. ex Willd.
- Scleria wrightiana* Boeckeler

== Cyrillaceae ==
- Cyrilla coriacea* Berazaín
- Cyrilla cubensis* P.Wilson
- Cyrilla lutgardae* Berazaín
- Cyrilla macrocarpa* Berazaín
- Cyrilla megaphylla* Berazaín
- Cyrilla microareolata* Berazaín
- Cyrilla nipensis* Urb.
- Cyrilla nitidissima* Urb.
- Cyrilla racemiflora L.
- Cyrilla silvae* Berazaín

== Dennstaedtiaceae ==
- Dennstaedtia arborescens Ekman ex Maxon
- Dennstaedtia bipinnata (Cav.) Maxon
- Dennstaedtia cicutaria (Sw.) T.Moore
- Dennstaedtia dissecta (Sw.) T.Moore
- Dennstaedtia globulifera (Poir.) Hieron
- Dennstaedtia obtusifolia (Willd.) T.Moore
- Histiopteris incisa (Thunb.) J.Sm.
- Hiya nigrescens (Hook.) H.Shang
- Hypolepis cubensis* Schwartsb.
- Hypolepis repens (L.) C.Presl
- Microlepia speluncae (L.) T.Moore
- Paesia glandulosa Kuhn
- Pteridium arachnoideum (Kaulf.) Maxon
- Pteridium caudatum (L.) Maxon

== Dichapetalaceae ==
- Tapura cubensis (Poepp.) Griseb.
  - Tapura cubensis subsp. minor* Prance – eastern Cuba
- Tapura orbicularis* Ekman ex Urb. – eastern Cuba

== Dilleniaceae ==
- Curatella americana L.
- Davilla nitida (Vahl) Kubitzki
- Doliocarpus dentatus (Aubl.) Standl.
- Doliocarpus herrerae Pérez Camacho – western Cuba
- Doliocarpus multiflorus Standl.
- Tetracera volubilis L.

== Dioscoreaceae ==
- Dioscorea baracoensis (R.Knuth) Raz – eastern Cuba and Haiti
- Dioscorea cephalocarpa* (Uline ex R.Knuth) Raz – western Cuba
- Dioscorea chondrocarpa Griseb.
- Dioscorea cubensis* R.Knuth – eastern Cuba
- Dioscorea haitiensis R.Knuth – southeastern Cuba and Hispaniola
- Dioscorea introrsa Raz – eastern Cuba
- Dioscorea microphylla (Kunth) Greuter & J.Pérez
- Dioscorea nipensis* R.A.Howard
- Dioscorea polygonoides Humb. & Bonpl. ex Willd.
- Dioscorea porulosa* (R.Knuth) Raz – east-central and eastern Cuba
- Dioscorea pseudocleistogama Raz & J.Pérez – south-central Cuba
- Dioscorea psilostachya (Kunth) Raz – western Cuba incl. I. de la Juventud
- Dioscorea quinquefolia (L.) Raz
- Dioscorea raziae Greuter & J.Pérez – south-central Cuba
- Dioscorea richardhowardii Raz – eastern Cuba
- Dioscorea scorpioidea C.Wright – western Cuba
- Dioscorea tamoidea Griseb. – Cuba and Haiti
  - Dioscorea tamoidea subsp. lindenii (Uline ex R.Knuth) Raz – southeastern Cuba and Haiti
  - Dioscorea tamoidea subsp. tamoidea*
- Dioscorea theresensis* (Uline ex R.Knuth) Raz – Isla Teresa
- Dioscorea wrightii Uline ex R.Knuth – western Cuba

== Droseraceae ==
- Drosera brevifolia Pursh
- Drosera capillaris Poir.
- Drosera intermedia Hayne

== Ebenaceae ==
- Diospyros anisandra S.F.Blake
- Diospyros caribaea (A.DC.) Standl.
- Diospyros crassinervis (Krug & Urb.) Standl. – central and easern Cuba, Bahamas, and Hispaniola
- Diospyros grisebachii* (Hiern) Standl.
- Diospyros halesioides* Griseb.
- Diospyros × leonis* (Britton & P.Wilson) Standl. (D. crassinervis × D. grisebachii)
- Diospyros tetrasperma Sw.

== Elaeocarpaceae ==
- Sloanea amygdalina* Griseb. – western and eastern Cuba
- Sloanea curatellifolia* Griseb. – eastern Cuba

== Elatinaceae ==
- Bergia sessiliflora* Griseb.

== Equisetaceae ==
- Equisetum giganteum L.

== Ericaceae ==
- Bejaria cubensis* Griseb. – western Cuba
- Kalmia ericoides* Griseb.
- Lyonia affinis* (A.Rich.) Urb. – southeastern Cuba
- Lyonia ekmanii* Urb. – western Cuba
- Lyonia elliptica* (Small) Alain – eastern Cuba
- Lyonia glandulosa* (A.Rich.) Griseb. – eastern Cuba
- Lyonia latifolia* (A.Rich.) Griseb. – southeastern Cuba
- Lyonia lippoldii* R.Berazaín & Bisse – eastern Cuba
- Lyonia longipes* Urb. – eastern Cuba
- Lyonia lucida (Lam.) K.Koch – western Cuba incl. I. de la Juventud and the southeastern United States
- Lyonia macrophylla* (Britton) Ekman ex Urb. – eastern Cuba
- Lyonia maestrensis* Acuña & Roíg – southeastern Cuba
- Lyonia myrtilloides* Griseb. – western Cuba incl. I. de la Juventud
- Lyonia nipensis* Urb. – eastern Cuba
- Lyonia obtusa* Griseb. – eastern Cuba
- Lyonia santiagoana* Bécquer & Berazaín
- Lyonia trinidadensis* Judd – south-central Cuba
- Pieris cubensis* (Griseb.) Small – western Cuba incl. I. de la Juventud
- Vaccinium alainii* Acuña & Roíg – eastern Cuba
- Vaccinium bissei* R.Berazaín – south-central Cuba (Sierra del Escambray)
- Vaccinium cubense Griseb. – eastern Cuba and central Dominican Republic
- Vaccinium leonis* Acuña & Roíg – southeastern Cuba
- Vaccinium shaferi* Acuña & Roíg – eastern Cuba
- Vaccinium urquiolae* Berazaín – western Cuba

== Eriocaulaceae ==
- Eriocaulon arenicola* Britton & Small – I. de la Juventud
- Eriocaulon cubense* Ruhland – I. de la Juventud
- Eriocaulon echinospermoideum* Ruhland – west-central Cuba (Villa Clara)
- Eriocaulon echinospermum* C.Wright – western Cuba
- Eriocaulon ekmannii* Ruhland – western Cuba
- Eriocaulon fuliginosum Griseb.
- Eriocaulon melanocephalum Kunth – western Cuba, Trinidad, and tropical South America
- † Eriocaulon minutissimum* Ruhland – western Cuba
- Eriocaulon miserrimum* Ruhland – I. de la Juventud
- Eriocaulon ovoideum* Britton & Small – I. de la Juventud
- Eriocaulon pseudocompressum* Ruhland – western Cuba
- Eriocaulon sclerocephalum* Ruhland – southwestern Cuba incl. I. de la Juventud
- Eriocaulon sigmoideum* C.Wright – western Cuba incl. I. de la Juventud
- Paepalanthus alsinoides* C.Wright – Cuba incl. I. de la Juventud
- Paepalanthus anceps (Walter) Christenh. & Byng – northern I. de la Juventud and southern United States
- † Paepalanthus cubensis* (Ruhland) Christenh. & Byng – west-central Cuba (Villa Clara)
- Paepalanthus ekmanii* (Ruhland) Christenh. & Byng – western Cuba
- Paepalanthus fluviatilis (Aubl.) Christenh. & Byng
- Paepalanthus lamarckii Kunth
- Paepalanthus moaensis* Gonz.Géigel – eastern Cuba (Sierra de Moa)
- Paepalanthus nipensis* Gonz.Géigel – eastern Cuba (Sierra de Nipe)
- Paepalanthus pungens* Griseb. – southeastern Cuba
- Paepalanthus retusus* C.Wright – western Cuba
- Paepalanthus riparius* Moldenke – eastern Cuba (Sierra de Moa)
- Paepalanthus seslerioides* Griseb. – western Cuba incl. I. de la Juventud
- Syngonanthus androsaceus* (Griseb.) Ruhland – western Cuba
- Syngonanthus insularis* Moldenke – I. de la Juventud
- Syngonanthus lagopodioides* (Griseb.) Ruhland – western Cuba incl. I. de la Juventud

== Erythroxylaceae ==
- Erythroxylum alaternifolium* A.Rich.
- Erythroxylum areolatum L.
- Erythroxylum armatum* Oviedo & Borhidi
- Erythroxylum banaoense* Oviedo
- Erythroxylum baracoense* Borhidi – southeastern Cuba
- Erythroxylum brevipes DC.
- Erythroxylum clarense* Borhidi – Las Villas
- Erythroxylum confusum Britton
- Erythroxylum coriaceum* Britton & P.Wilson
- Erythroxylum dumosum* Alain
- Erythroxylum flavicans* Borhidi – eastern Cuba
- Erythroxylum havanense Jacq.
- Erythroxylum horridum* Borhidi & Oviedo
- Erythroxylum longipes* O.E.Schulz
- Erythroxylum minutifolium Griseb.
- Erythroxylum mogotense* Oviedo
- Erythroxylum pedicellare* (Griseb.) O.E.Schulz
- Erythroxylum roigii* Britton & P.Wilson – I. de la Juventud
- Erythroxylum rotundifolium Lunan
- Erythroxylum rufum Cav.

== Euphorbiaceae ==
- Acalypha alopecuroidea Jacq.
- Acalypha chamaedrifolia (Lam.) Müll.Arg.
- Acalypha cubensis Urb. – western and central Cuba
- Acalypha cuspidata Jacq.
- Acalypha distans* Müll.Arg. – western and central Cuba
- Acalypha fissa* (Müll.Arg.) Hutch.
- Acalypha glechomifolia A.Rich.
- Acalypha havanensis Müll.Arg. – western and west-central Cuba and southwestern Mexico
- Acalypha hutchinsonii Britton – south-central Cuba
- Acalypha laxiflora Müll.Arg.
- Acalypha leptorhachis Müll.Arg. – western Cuba and St. Vincent
- Acalypha maestrensis Urb. – Sierra Maestra
- Acalypha membranacea A.Rich.
- Acalypha mogotensis Urb. – western Cuba
- Acalypha nana (Müll.Arg.) Griseb. ex Hutch. – western Cuba
- Acalypha pendula C.Wright ex Griseb. – western and central Cuba and Hispaniola
- Acalypha persimilis Müll.Arg.
- Acalypha pygmaea A.Rich. – western and central Cuba
- Acalypha rupestris Urb. – Sierra Maestra
- Acalypha setosa A.Rich.
- Acidocroton acunae* Borhidi & O.Muñiz
- Acidocroton adelioides Griseb. – western and central Cuba
- Acidocroton ekmanii Urb. – eastern Cuba
- Acidocroton lobulatus Urb. – southeastern Cuba
- Acidocroton oligostemon Urb. – central and eastern Cuba
- Acidocroton trichophyllus* Urb.
- Actinostemon brachypodus* (Griseb.) Urb. – Pinar del Río and La Habana
- Adelia ricinella L.
- Alchornea latifolia Sw.
- Argythamnia candicans Sw.
- Argythamnia cubensis Britton & P.Wilson – southeastern Cuba
- Argythamnia fasciculata (Vahl ex A.Juss.) Müll.Arg.
- Argythamnia heteropilosa J.W.Ingram – eastern Cuba
- Argythamnia microphylla Pax – northern Camagüey
- Argythamnia polygama (Jacq.) Kuntze
- Astraea lobata (L.) Klotzsch
- Bernardia carpinifolia Griseb.
- Bernardia corensis (Jacq.) Müll.Arg.
- Bernardia dichotoma (Willd.) Müll.Arg.
  - Bernardia dichotoma var. venosa* (Griseb.) Müll.Arg.
- Bonania cubana A.Rich.
  - Bonania cubana subsp. acunae* (Borhidi) Borhidi
  - Bonania cubana subsp. microphylla* (Urb.) Borhidi
- Bonania elliptica* Urb. – southern and eastern Cuba
- Bonania emarginata* C.Wright ex Griseb.
- Bonania erythrosperma* (Griseb.) Benth. & Hook.f. ex B.D.Jacks.
- † Bonania myricifolia* (Griseb.) Benth. & Hook.f. – Guantánamo
- Caperonia castaneifolia (L.) A.St.-Hil.
- Caperonia cubana* Pax & K.Hoffm. – western and central Cuba
- Caperonia palustris (L.) A.St.-Hil.
- Cnidoscolus bellator* (Ekman ex Urb.) León – western Cuba
- Cnidoscolus matosii* León – eastern Cuba
- Cnidoscolus rangel* (M.Gómez) McVaugh – Pinar del Río
- Cnidoscolus regina* (León) Radcl.-Sm. & Govaerts – Sierra Sagua Baracoa
- Cnidoscolus urens (L.) Janti
- Croton acunae Borhidi
- Croton alainii B.W.van Ee & P.E.Berry – eastern Cuba (Sierra de Moa)
- Croton betulinus Vahl
- Croton bispinosus C.Wright Cuba incl. I. de la Juventud
- Croton borhidii O.Muñiz
- Croton brittonianus* Carabi
- Croton cerinus* Müll.Arg – western Cuba incl. I. de la Juventud
- Croton ciliatoglandulifer Ortega
- Croton clavuliger* Müll.Arg – eastern Cuba (Sierra Sagua Baracoa)
- Croton corallicola* Borhidi
- Croton corylifolius Lam.
- Croton craspedotrichus* Griseb. – western Cuba (incl. I. de la Juventud
- Croton cristalensis* Urb. – eastern Cuba (Sierra del Cristal)
- Croton cycloideus* Borhidi & O.Muñiz
- Croton ekmanii* Urb. – eastern Cuba (Sierra Sagua Baracoa)
- Croton eluteria* (L.) W.Wright – western Cuba, Bahamas, and Hispaniola
- Croton flavens L.
- Croton glabellus L.
- Croton glandulosus L.
- Croton holguinensis* Borhidi – Holguín
- Croton humilis L.
- Croton jaucoensis* Borhidi
- Croton leonis (Croizat) B.W.van Ee & P.E.Berry – eastern Cuba (Sierra de Moa)
- Croton leucophlebius C.Wright ex Griseb. – Sierra de los Organos
- Croton linearis Jacq.
- Croton maestrensis* (Alain) B.W.van Ee & P.E.Berry – southeastern Cuba
- Croton micradenus* Urb.
- Croton microcarpus Ham.
- Croton miraflorensis* Borhidi
- Croton monogynus* Urb. – eastern Cuba
- Croton moschatus* Monteverde & T.P.Betanc. – Cuba incl. I. de la Juventud
- Croton munizii Borhidi
- Croton myricifolius* Griseb. – central and eastern Cuba
- Croton niveus Jacq.
- Croton ophiticola* Borhidi
- Croton orientensis* Borhidi – eastern Cuba
- Croton origanifolius Lam.
- Croton pachyrachis* Alain
- Croton pachysepalus Griseb. – eastern Cuba and Hispaniola
- Croton palmatus* Sessé & Moc.
- Croton panduriformis* Müll.Arg. – Sierra de los Organos
- Croton pervestitus* C.Wright ex Griseb. – eastern Cuba
- Croton prostratus* Urb. – eastern Cuba (Sierra de Nipe)
- Croton punctatus Jacq.
- Croton revolutus* (Alain) B.W.van Ee & P.E.Berry – Matanzas
- Croton rosmarinoides Millsp.
- Croton spiralis* Müll.Arg. – eastern Cuba
- Croton stenophyllus* Griseb. – central and eastern Cuba
- Croton subdecumbens* Borhidi & O.Muñiz
- Croton trigonocarpus* Griseb.
- Croton vaccinioides* A.Rich. – central and eastern Cuba
- Croton viminalis* Griseb. – eastern Cuba
- Dalechampia denticulata* C.Wright ex Griseb. – western Cuba
- Dalechampia scandens L.
- Ditta maestrensis* Borhidi – eastern Cuba (Sierra Maestra)
- Ditta myricoides Griseb.
- Euphorbia adenoptera Bertol.
- Euphorbia berteroana Balb. ex Spreng.
- Euphorbia blodgettii Engelm. ex Hitchc.
- Euphorbia bombensis Jacq.
- Euphorbia camagueyensis* (Millsp.) Urb. – east-central Cuba
- Euphorbia cassythoides Boiss.
- Euphorbia centunculoides Kunth
- Euphorbia crassinodis* Urb. – southern Cuba
- Euphorbia cubensis* Boiss. – western Cuba
- Euphorbia cyathophora Murray
- Euphorbia dioeca Kunth
- Euphorbia filicaulis* Urb. – eastern Cuba
- Euphorbia graminea Jacq.
- Euphorbia gundlachii* Urb.
- Euphorbia gutierrezii* García-Beltrán & J.L.Gómez
- Euphorbia helenae* Urb. – eastern Cuba
- Euphorbia heterophylla L.
- Euphorbia hirta L.
- Euphorbia hypericifolia L.
- Euphorbia hyssopifolia L.
- Euphorbia lasiocarpa Klotzsch
- Euphorbia maculata L.
- Euphorbia mendezii Boiss.
- Euphorbia mesembryanthemifolia Jacq.
- Euphorbia millspaughii* V.W.Steinm. & P.E.Berry
- Euphorbia minutula Boiss. – western and Central Cuba and the Bahamas
- Euphorbia monantha* C.Wright ex Boiss.
- Euphorbia munizii* Borhidi
- Euphorbia nutans Lag.
- Euphorbia paredonensis* (Millsp.) Oudejans
- Euphorbia pergamena Small
- Euphorbia pinetorum (Small) G.L.Webster
- Euphorbia podocarpifolia* Urb. – northeastern Cuba
- Euphorbia prostrata Aiton
- Euphorbia scutiformis* V.W.Steinm. & P.E.Berry – eastern Cuba
- Euphorbia serpens Kunth
- Euphorbia sessei* Oudejans
- Euphorbia sinclairiana Benth.
- Euphorbia thymifolia L.
- Euphorbia tithymaloides L.
- Euphorbia torralbasii Urb.
- Euphorbia trichotoma Kunth
- Euphorbia turpinii Boiss.
- Euphorbia umbelliformis (Urb. & Ekman) V.W.Steinm. & P.E.Berry
- Grimmeodendron eglandulosum (A.Rich.) Urb.
- Gymnanthes albicans* (Griseb.) Urb.
- Gymnanthes lucida Sw.
- Gymnanthes pallens (Griseb.) Müll.Arg.
- Gymnanthes recurva* Urb. – eastern Cuba
- Hippomane mancinella L.
- Hura crepitans L.
- Jatropha angustifolia* Griseb. – western Cuba incl. I. de la Juventud
- Jatropha curcas L.
- Jatropha glaucovirens* Pax & K.Hoffm. – central Cuba incl. I. de la Juventud
- Jatropha gossypiifolia L.
- Jatropha integerrima Jacq. – western Cuba incl. I. de la Juventud
- Jatropha multifida L.
- Jatropha pauciflora C.Wright ex Griseb.
  - Jatropha pauciflora subsp. pauciflora* – central and eastern Cuba
- Jatropha paxii* Croizat – western and central Cuba
- Jatropha tupifolia* Griseb. – central and eastern Cuba
- Lasiocroton bahamensis Pax & K.Hoffm.
- Lasiocroton gracilis* Britton & P.Wilson – southeastern Cuba
- Lasiocroton gutierrezii* Jestrow
- Lasiocroton microphyllus* (A.Rich.) Jestrow – central and eastern Cuba
- Leucocroton* Griseb.
  - Leucocroton acunae* Borhidi
  - Leucocroton anomalus* Borhidi
  - Leucocroton bracteosus* Urb. – eastern Cuba
  - Leucocroton brittonii* Alain – eastern Cuba
  - Leucocroton comosus* Urb. – eastern Cuba (Sierra de Nipe)
  - Leucocroton cordifolius* (Britton & P.Wilson) Alain – northeastern Cuba
  - Leucocroton discolor* Urb. – eastern Cuba (Sierra de Nipe)
  - Leucocroton ekmanii* Urb. – eastern Cuba (Sierra Sagua Baracoa)
  - Leucocroton flavicans* Müll.Arg – central Cuba
  - Leucocroton havanensis* Borhidi
  - Leucocroton incrustatus* Borhidi
  - Leucocroton linearifolius* Britton – eastern Cuba (Sierra de Moa)
  - Leucocroton longibracteatus* Borhidi
  - Leucocroton moaensis* Borhidi & O.Muñiz – eastern Cuba
  - Leucocroton moncadae* Borhidi
  - Leucocroton obovatus* Urb. – eastern Cuba (Sierra del Cristal)
  - Leucocroton pachyphylloides* Borhidi
  - Leucocroton pachyphyllus* Urb. – eastern Cuba (Sierra de Moa)
  - Leucocroton pallidus* Britton & P.Wilson – eastern Cuba
  - Leucocroton revolutus* C.Wright – western and central Cuba
  - Leucocroton sameki* Borhidi
  - Leucocroton saxicola* Britton – eastern Cuba (Sierra de Nipe)
  - Leucocroton stenophyllus* Urb. – eastern Cuba (Sierra de Nipe)
  - Leucocroton subpeltatus* (Urb.) Alain – northeastern Cuba
  - Leucocroton virens* Griseb. – east-central and northeastern Cuba
  - Leucocroton wrightii* Griseb.
- Microstachys corniculata (Vahl) A.Juss. ex Griseb.
- Omphalea diandra L.
- Omphalea hypoleuca* Griseb. – western Cuba
- Omphalea trichotoma* Müll.Arg.
- Platygyna dentata* Alain
- Platygyna hexandra (Jacq.) Müll.Arg.
- Platygyna leonis* Alain – eastern Cuba
- Platygyna obovata* Borhidi – eastern Cuba
- Platygyna parvifolia* Alain – east-central and eastern Cuba
- Platygyna triandra* Borhidi – eastern Cuba
- Platygyna volubilis* R.A.Howard – eastern Cuba (Sierra de Moa)
- Sapium adenodon Griseb. – eastern Cuba
- Sapium daphnoides* Griseb.
- Sapium glandulosum (L.) Morong
- Sapium laurifolium (A.Rich.) Griseb.
- Sapium leucogynum* C.Wright ex Griseb. – western Cuba
- Sapium parvifolium* Alain – eastern Cuba
- Sebastiania glandulosa (Sw.) Müll.Arg.
- Tragia cubensis* Urb. – central and eastern Cuba
- Tragia gracilis* Griseb. – eastern Cuba
- Tragia volubilis L.

== Fabaceae ==
- Aeschynomene americana L.
- Aeschynomene evenia C.Wright
- Aeschynomene filosa Mart. ex Benth.
- Aeschynomene fluminensis Vell.
- Aeschynomene pratensis Small
- Aeschynomene rudis Benth.
- Aeschynomene sensitiva Sw.
- Aeschynomene villosa Poir.
- Aeschynomene virginica (L.) Britton, Sterns & Poggenb.
- Ancistrotropis peduncularis (Fawc. & Rendle) A.Delgado
- Andira cubensis* Benth.
- Andira inermis (W.Wright) Kunth ex DC.
- Ateleia apetala* Griseb. – western and central Cuba
- Ateleia cubensis Griseb.
- Ateleia gummifera* (Bertero ex DC.) D.Dietr.
- Ateleia salicifolia* Mohlenbr. – central Cuba
- Barbieria pinnata (Pers.) Baill.
- Bauhinia dipetala Hemsl.
- Bauhinia divaricata L.
- Bauhinia jenningsii P.Wilson
- Bauhinia subrotundifolia Cav.
- Behaimia* Griseb.
  - Behaimia cubensis* Griseb.
- Brya buxifolia (Murray) Urb. – eastern Cuba and Hispaniola
- Brya chrysogonii* León & Alain – southeastern Cuba
- Brya depressa* Borhidi & A.Barreto
- Brya ebenus* (L.) DC.
- Brya hirsuta Borhidi
- Brya microphylla Bisse
- Brya subinermis León & Alain – Sierra de Moa
- Caesalpinia bahamensis Lam.
  - Caesalpinia bahamensis subsp. orientensis* Borhidi
  - Caesalpinia bahamensis subsp. rugeliana* (Urb.) Borhidi – eastern Cuba
- Caesalpinia nipensis* Urb. – eastern Cuba
- Calliandra haematomma (Bertero ex DC.) Benth.
  - Calliandra haematomma var. colletioides* (Griseb.) Barneby – east-central and southeastern Cuba
- Calliandra pauciflora A.Rich.) Griseb.
- Calopogonium caeruleum (Benth.) C.Wright
- Calopogonium mucunoides Desv.
- Canavalia brasiliensis Mart. ex Benth.
- Canavalia ensiformis (L.) DC.
- Canavalia microsperma Urb. – southwestern Cuba and Panama
- Canavalia nitida (Cav.) Piper
- Canavalia rosea (Sw.) DC.
- Cassia grandis L.f.
- Cenostigma eriostachys (Benth.) Gagnon & G.P.Lewis
- Cenostigma gaumeri (Greenm.) Gagnon & G.P.Lewis
- Cenostigma myabense* (Britton) Gagnon & G.P.Lewis – east-central and eastern Cuba
- Cenostigma pinnatum* (Griseb.) Gagnon & G.P.Lewis – central and eastern Cuba
- Centrosema molle Mart. ex Benth.
- Centrosema plumieri (Turpin ex Pers.) Benth.
- Centrosema pubescens Benth.
- Centrosema sagittatum (Humb. & Bonpl. ex Willd.) Brandegee
- Centrosema virginianum (L.) Benth.
- Chamaecrista bissei* A.Barreto & Yakovlev
- Chamaecrista bucherae* (Moldenke) H.S.Irwin & Barneby – eastern Cuba
- Chamaecrista cupeyalensis* A.Barreto & Yakovlev
- Chamaecrista diphylla (L.) Greene
- Chamaecrista falcifoliolata A.Barreto & Yakovlev
- Chamaecrista flexuosa (L.) Greene
- Chamaecrista glandulosa (L.) Greene
- Chamaecrista guanensis* A.Barreto & Yakovlev
- Chamaecrista hispidula (Vahl) H.S.Irwin & Barneby
- Chamaecrista kunthiana (Schltdl. & Cham.) H.S.Irwin & Barneby
- Chamaecrista lineata (Sw.) Greene
  - Chamaecrista lineata var. arduinervis* (Urb.) Govaerts – eastern Cuba
  - Chamaecrista lineata var. banesensis*
  - Chamaecrista lineata var. iniasensis* A.Barreto & Yakovlev
  - Chamaecrista lineata var. maestrensis* A.Barreto & Yakovlev – eastern Cuba
  - Chamaecrista lineata var. trifoliata* A.Barreto & Yakovlev
- Chamaecrista macambensis* A.Barreto & Yakovlev
- Chamaecrista marianensis* A.Barreto & Yakovlev
- Chamaecrista nictitans (L.) Moench
  - Chamaecrista nictitans var. brevicarpellata* A.Barreto & Yakovlev
- Chamaecrista pedicellaris (DC.) Britton
- Chamaecrista pilosa (L.) Greene
- Chamaecrista pygmaea (DC.) Britton
  - Chamaecrista pygmaea var. diffusissima* (Britton) A.Barreto & Yakovlev
  - Chamaecrista pygmaea var. pinosensis* A.Barreto & Yakovlev
  - Chamaecrista pygmaea var. savannarum* (Britton) H.S.Irwin & Barneby – western Cuba
- Chamaecrista rotundifolia (Pers.) Greene
- Chamaecrista serpens (L.) Greene
- Chamaecrista takhtajanii* A.Barreto & Yakovlev
- Chloroleucon guantanamense (Britton) Britton & Rose – southeastern Cuba and southern Hispaniola
- Chloroleucon mangense (Jacq.) Britton & Rose
- Clitoria falcata Lam.
- Clitoria guianensis (Aubl.) Benth.
- Clitoria speciosa* Cav.
- Cojoba arborea (L.) Britton & Rose
- Coulteria cubensis (Greenm.) Sotuyo & G.P.Lewis
- Crotalaria incana L.
- Crotalaria lotifolia L.
- Crotalaria maypurensis Kunth
- Crotalaria pilosa Mill.
- Crotalaria pumila Ortega
- Crotalaria sagittalis L.
- Crotalaria vitellina Ker Gawl.
- Crudia spicata (Aubl.) Forsyth f.
- Ctenodon minimus (Martyn) Wajer & Mabb.
- Ctenodon tenuis* (Griseb.) D.B.O.S.Cardoso & H.C.Lima
- Ctenodon viscidulus (Michx.) D.B.O.S.Cardoso & A.Delgado
- Cynometra cubensis* A.Rich.
- Dalbergia berteroi (DC.) Urb.
- Dalbergia brownei (Jacq.) Schinz
- Dalbergia ecastaphyllum (L.) Taub.
- Dalbergia monetaria L.f.
- Dalea carthagenensis (Jacq.) J.F.Macbr.
- Dalea scandens (Houst. ex Mill.) R.T.Clausen
- Denisophytum pauciflorum (Griseb.) Gagnon & G.P.Lewis
- Desmanthus leptophyllus Kunth
- Desmanthus pernambucanus (L.) Thell.
- Desmanthus pubescens B.L.Turner
- Desmanthus virgatus (L.) Willd.
- Desmodium affine Schltdl.
- Desmodium angustifolium (Kunth) DC.
- Desmodium axillare (Sw.) DC.
- Desmodium ciliare (Muhl. ex Willd.) DC.
- Desmodium cubense Griseb.
- Desmodium distortum (Aubl.) J.F.Macbr.
- Desmodium glabrum (Mill.) DC.
- Desmodium incanum (Sw.) DC.
- Desmodium obtusum (Muhl. ex Willd.) DC.
- Desmodium scorpiurus (Sw.) Poir.
- Entada gigas (L.) Fawc. & Rendle
- Eriosema crinitum (Kunth) G.Don
- Eriosema violaceum (Aubl.) G.Don
- Erythrina acunae* Borhidi
- Erythrina berteroana Urb.
- Erythrina cubensis* C.Wright
- Erythrina elenae* R.A.Howard & W.R.Briggs
- Erythrina fusca Lour.
- Erythrina grisebachii* Urb.
- Erythrina linearifoliata* Areces
- Erythrina standleyana Krukoff
- Erythrina velutina Willd.
- Erythrostemon glandulosus (Bertero ex DC.) Gagnon & G.P.Lewis – eastern Cuba and Hispaniola
- Galactia acunana* Borhidi & O.Muñiz – western and central Cuba
- Galactia brachyodon* Griseb. – southeastern Cuba
- Galactia combsii Urb.
- Galactia cuneata* Alain – southeastern Cuba
- Galactia dubia DC.
- Galactia earlei* Britton – southeastern Cuba
- Galactia galactioides* (Griseb.) Hitchc.
- Galactia herradurensis* Urb. – western Cuba
- Galactia isopoda* Urb. – western Cuba
- Galactia jenningsii* Britton – I. de la Juventud
- Galactia jussiaeana Kunth
- Galactia maisiana* Alain – southeastern Cuba
- Galactia minutiflora* Urb. – southeastern Cuba
- Galactia monophylla Griseb.
- Galactia parvifolia A.Rich.
- Galactia regularis* (L.) Britton, Sterns & Poggenb.
- Galactia revoluta* Urb. – eastern Cuba
- Galactia rotundata* Alain – eastern Cuba (Holguín)
- Galactia savannarum* Britton
- Galactia spiciformis Torr. & A.Gray
- Galactia striata (Jacq.) Urb.
- Galactia suberecta* Britton – I. de la Juventud
- Grona adscendens (Sw.) H.Ohashi & K.Ohashi
- Grona barbata (L.) H.Ohashi & K.Ohashi
- Grona triflora (L.) H.Ohashi & K.Ohashi
- Guibourtia hymenaeifolia* (Moric.) J.Léonard
- Guilandina barkeriana (Urb. & Ekman) Britton
- Guilandina bonduc L.
- Guilandina ciliata Bergius ex Wikstr.
- Guilandina glaucophylla (Urb.) Britton & Rose
- Guilandina intermedia (Urb.) Britton & Rose
- Guilandina major (Medik.) Small
- Guilandina wrightiana* (Urb.) Britton & Rose – eastern Cuba, Cayman Islands, and Jamaica
- Harpalyce acunae* Borhidi & O.Muñiz – northeastern Cuba
- Harpalyce alainii* León – northeastern Cuba
- Harpalyce baracoensis* Borhidi & O.Muñiz – eastern Cuba
- Harpalyce borhidii* O.Muñiz – eastern Cuba
- Harpalyce cristalensis* Borhidi & O.Muñiz – eastern Cuba (Sierra del Cristal)
- Harpalyce cubensis* Griseb. – western Cuba
- Harpalyce ekmanii* Urb. – eastern Cuba
- Harpalyce greuteri* R.Rankin & P.A.González
- Harpalyce macrocarpa* Britton & P.Wilson – central Cuba
- Harpalyce maisiana* León & Alain – eastern Cuba
- Harpalyce marianensis* R.Rankin, P.A.González & Greuter
- Harpalyce nipensis* Urb. – eastern Cuba
- Harpalyce revoluta* P.A.González
- Harpalyce suberosa* Urb. – western Cuba
- Harpalyce toaensis* Borhidi & O.Muñiz – eastern Cuba
- Harpalyce villosa* Britton & P.Wilson – Sierra de Moa
- Hebestigma* Urb.
  - Hebestigma cubense* (Kunth) Urb.
- Herpyza* Sauvalle
  - Herpyza grandiflora* (Griseb.) C.Wright
- Hymenaea courbaril L.
- Hymenaea torrei* León
- Indigofera lespedezioides Kunth
- Indigofera micheliana Rose
- Indigofera microcarpa Desv.
- Indigofera miniata Ortega
- Indigofera subulata Vahl ex Poir.
- Indigofera suffruticosa Mill.
- Inga laurina (Sw.) Willd.
- Inga punctata Willd.
- Inga vera Willd.
- Jupunba asplenifolia* (Griseb.) Britton & Rose
- Jupunba glauca (Urb.) Britton & Rose
- Jupunba maestrensis* (Urb.) García-Beltrán – eastern Cuba
- Jupunba nipensis* (Britton) Britton & Rose – eastern Cuba
- Jupunba obovalis (A.Rich.) Britton & Rose
- Jupunba oppositifolia (Urb.) Britton & Rose – south-central and southeastern Cuba
- Leptospron adenanthum (G.Mey.) A.Delgado
- Libidibia coriaria (Jacq.) Schltdl.
- Lonchocarpus blainii* C.Wright
- Lonchocarpus glaucifolius Urb.
- Lonchocarpus heptaphyllus (Poir.) DC.
- Lonchocarpus longipes Urb. & Ekman
- Lonchocarpus sericeus (Poir.) Kunth ex DC.
- Lysiloma latisiliquum (L.) Benth.
- Lysiloma sabicu Benth.
- Macropsychanthus comosus (G.Mey.) L.P.Queiroz & Snak
- Macropsychanthus wilsonii (Standl.) L.P.Queiroz & Snak
- Macroptilium gibbosifolium (Ortega) A.Delgado
- Macroptilium gracile (Poepp. ex Benth.) Urb.
- Macroptilium lathyroides (L.) Urb.
- Macroptilium longepedunculatum (Mart. ex Benth.) Urb.
- Mimosa diplotricha C.Wright
- Mimosa distachya Cav.
- Mimosa ekmanii* Urb.
- Mimosa fagaracantha* Griseb.
- Mimosa pigra L.
- Mimosa pudica L.
- Mimosa viva L.
- Mucuna sloanei Fawc. & Rendle
- Mucuna urens (L.) Medik.
- Neltuma juliflora (Sw.) Raf.
- Neptunia oleracea Lour.
- Neptunia plena (L.) Benth.
- Neptunia pubescens Benth.
- Oxyrhynchus volubilis Brandegee
- Parkinsonia aculeata L.
- Peltophorum dubium (Spreng.) Taub.
- Pictetia angustifolia* Griseb.
- Pictetia marginata C.Wright
- Pictetia mucronata* (Griseb.) Beyra & Lavin
- Pictetia nipensis* (Urb.) Beyra & Lavin – Sierra de Nipe
- Pictetia spinosa* (A.Rich.) Beyra & Lavin – eastern Cuba
- Pictetia sulcata (P.Beauv.) Beyra & Lavin
- Piscidia carthagenensis Jacq.
- Piscidia cubensis* Urb.
- Piscidia havanensis* (Britton & P.Wilson) Urb. & Ekman
- Piscidia piscipula (L.) Sarg.
- Pithecellobium × bahamense* Northr. (P. keyensis × P. histrix)
- Pithecellobium circinale (L.) Benth.
- Pithecellobium histrix (A.Rich.) Benth.
- Pithecellobium keyense Britton
- Pithecellobium unguis-cati (L.) Benth.
- Poeppigia procera (Poepp. ex Spreng.) C.Presl
- Poiretia punctata (Willd.) Desv.
- Poitea cubensis* (Rydb.) J.L.Gómez – eastern Cuba
- Poitea gracilis* (Griseb.) Lavin
- Poitea immarginata* (C.Wright) Lavin
- Poitea savannarum* (Britton & P.Wilson) J.L.Gómez
- Poitea wrightiana* J.L.Gómez
- Pseudalbizzia berteroana (Balb. ex DC.) Britton & Rose – eastern Cuba, Hispaniola, Jamaica, and Panama
- Pseudosamanea cubana* (Britton & P.Wilson) Barneby & J.W.Grimes
- Pterocarpus officinalis Jacq.
- Rhodopis rudolphioides (Griseb.) L.P.Queiroz – eastern Cuba, Bahamas, and Hispaniola
- Rhynchosia erythrinoides Schltdl. & Cham.
- Rhynchosia minima (L.) DC.
- Rhynchosia nipensis Urb. – eastern Cuba
- Rhynchosia parvifolia DC.
- Rhynchosia phaseoloides (Sw.) DC.
- Rhynchosia pyramidalis (Lam.) Urb.
- Rhynchosia reticulata (Sw.) DC.
- Rhynchosia swartzii (Vail) Urb.
- Schnella glabra (Jacq.) Dugand
- Senegalia maschalocephala* (Griseb.) Britton & Rose
- Senegalia tenuifolia (L.) Britton & Rose
- Senna acunae* (Borhidi) A.Barreto & Yakovlev
- Senna alata (L.) Roxb.
- Senna atomaria (L.) H.S.Irwin & Barneby
- Senna benitoensis* (Britton & P.Wilson) H.S.Irwin & Barneby
- Senna bicapsularis (L.) Roxb.
- Senna domingensis (Spreng.) H.S.Irwin & Barneby
- Senna gundlachii* (Urb.) H.S.Irwin & Barneby
- Senna hirsuta (L.) H.S.Irwin & Barneby
- Senna insularis* (Britton & Rose) H.S.Irwin & Barneby
- Senna ligustrina (L.) H.S.Irwin & Barneby
- Senna mexicana (Jacq.) H.S.Irwin & Barneby
  - Senna mexicana var. shaferi* (Britton & P.Wilson) H.S.Irwin & Barneby
- Senna occidentalis (L.) Link
- Senna pallida (Vahl) H.S.Irwin & Barneby
- Senna pendula (Humb. & Bonpl. ex Willd.) H.S.Irwin & Barneby
- Senna pilifera (Vogel) H.S.Irwin & Barneby
- Senna racemosa (Mill.) H.S.Irwin & Barneby
- Senna robiniifolia (Benth.) H.S.Irwin & Barneby
- Senna sophera (L.) Roxb.
- Senna stenophylla (Britton) H.S.Irwin & Barneby
- Senna uniflora (Mill.) H.S.Irwin & Barneby
- Sigmoidotropis antillana (Urb.) A.Delgado
- Sphinga prehensilis (C.Wright) Barneby & J.W.Grimes
- Sophora tomentosa L.
  - Sophora tomentosa var. angustifoliolata* A.Barreto
- Stylosanthes calcicola Small
- Stylosanthes hamata (L.) Taub.
- Stylosanthes humilis Kunth
- Stylosanthes tuberculata S.F.Blake
- Stylosanthes viscosa (L.) Sw.
- Swartzia cubensis (Britton & P.Wilson) Standl.
- Tara spinosa (Molina) Britton & Rose
- Tara vesicaria (L.) Molinari, Sánchez Och. & Mayta
- Tephrosia angustissima Shuttlew. ex Chapm.
- Tephrosia chrysophylla Pursh
- Tephrosia cinerea (L.) Pers.
- Tephrosia clementis* Alain
- Tephrosia Senna Kunth
- Tephrosia spicata (Walter) Torr. & A.Gray
- Teramnus labialis (L.f.) Spreng.
- Teramnus uncinatus (L.) Sw.
- Vachellia acuifera (Benth.) Seigler & Ebinger
- Vachellia baessleri H.D.Clarke, Seigler & Ebinger – south-central Cuba
- Vachellia belairioides* (Urb.) Seigler & Ebinger - Holguín
- Vachellia bucheri* (Vict.) Seigler & Ebinger - eastern Cuba
- Vachellia campeachiana (Mill.) Seigler & Ebinger
- Vachellia choriophylla (Benth.) Seigler & Ebinger
- Vachellia cupeyensis (León) García-Beltrán
- Vachellia daemon* (Ekman & Urb.) Seigler & Ebinger
- Vachellia farnesiana (L.) Wight & Arn.
- Vachellia macracantha (Humb. & Bonpl. ex Willd.) Seigler & Ebinger
- Vachellia polypyrigenes* (Greenm.) Seigler & Ebinger
- Vachellia roigii* (León) Seigler & Ebinger – Las Tunas
- Vachellia tortuosa (L.) Seigler & Ebinger
- Vachellia zapatensis* (Urb. & Ekman) Seigler & Ebinger – Matanzas
- Vicia acutifolia Elliott
- Vigna luteola (Jacq.) Benth.
- Vigna trichocarpa (C.Wright) A.Delgado
- Vigna vexillata (L.) A.Rich.
- Zapoteca caracasana (Jacq.) H.M.Hern.
- Zapoteca formosa (Kunth) H.M.Hern.
- Zornia arenicola* Bal.-Tul. & P.Herrera
- Zornia dichotoma Bal.-Tul. & P.Herrera
- Zornia latifolia Sm.
- Zornia microphylla Desv.
- Zornia myriadena Benth.
- Zornia reticulata Sm.
- Zygia latifolia (L.) Fawc. & Rendle

== Fagaceae ==
- Quercus sagraeana* Nutt. (=Quercus sagrana) – western Cuba

== Garryaceae ==
- Garrya fadyenii Hook.

== Gentianaceae ==
- Bisgoeppertia gracilis* (C.Wright ex Griseb.) Kuntze – northwestern and eastern Cuba
- Bisgoeppertia robustior* Greuter & R.Rankin
- Eustoma exaltatum (L.) Salisb. ex G.Don
- Lisianthius glandulosus* A.Rich.
- Lisianthius silenifolius (Griseb.) Urb.
- Macrocarpaea pinetorum* Alain
- Sabatia calycina (Lam.) A.Heller
- Sabatia grandiflora (A.Gray) Small
- Sabatia stellaris Pursh
- Schultesia brachyptera Cham.
- Schultesia guianensis (Aubl.) Malme
- Voyria aphylla (Jacq.) Pers.
- Voyria parasitica (Schltdl. & Cham.) Ruyters & Maas
- Voyria tenella Guilding ex Hook.
- Zeltnera quitensis (Kunth) G.Mans.
- Zonanthus* Griseb.
  - Zonanthus cubensis* Griseb.

== Gesneriaceae ==
- Bellonia spinosa Sw. – south-central and southeastern Cuba and Hispaniola
- Besleria lutea L.
- Chrysothemis pulchella (Donn ex Sims) Decne
- Columnea sanguinea (Pers.) Hanst.
- Columnea scandens L.
- Columnea tincta* Griseb. – eastern Cuba
- Gesneria binghamii* C.V.Morton
- Gesneria bracteosa* Urb. – eastern Cuba
- Gesneria brevifolia* Urb. – northwestern Cuba (Pan de Guajaibón)
- Gesneria celsioides* (Griseb.) Urb. – western Cuba
- Gesneria clarensis* Britton & P.Wilson – central Cuba (Sierra de Caballete)
- Gesneria cubensis (Decne.) Kuntze – southeastern Cuba and Hispaniola
- Gesneria depressa* (Griseb.) Urb. – eastern Cuba
- Gesneria duchartreoides* (C.Wright) Urb. – southeastern Cuba
- Gesneria ferruginea* (C.Wright) Urb. – western Cuba
- Gesneria fruticosa (L.) Kuntze – eastern Cuba and Hispaniola
- Gesneria glandulosa* (Griseb.) Urb. – eastern Cuba
- Gesneria gloxinioides* (Griseb.) Urb. northwestern Cuba (Bahía Honda)
- Gesneria heterochroa* Urb. – southeastern Cuba
- Gesneria humilis L.
- Gesneria libanensis* Linden ex C.Morren – southeastern Cuba
- Gesneria nipensis* Britton & P.Wilson – eastern Cuba
- Gesneria pachyclada* Urb. – eastern Cuba
- Gesneria purpurascens* Urb. – southeastern Cuba
- Gesneria reticulata (Griseb.) Urb. – eastern Cuba, Hispaniola, and Puerto Rico
- Gesneria salicifolia* (Griseb.) Urb. – eastern Cuba
- Gesneria viridiflora* (Decne.) Kuntze – south-central and southeastern Cuba
- Gesneria wrightii* Urb. – eastern Cuba
- Pheidonocarpa corymbosa (Sw.) L.E.Skog
  - Pheidonocarpa corymbosa subsp. cubensis* (C.V.Morton) L.E.Skog
- Phinaea pulchella* (Griseb.) C.V.Morton – western Cuba
- Rhytidophyllum acunae* C.V.Morton
- Rhytidophyllum coccineum* Urb. – southeastern Cuba
- Rhytidophyllum crenulatum* DC. – western Cuba
- Rhytidophyllum earlei* (Urb. & Britton) C.V.Morton – south-central Cuba
- Rhytidophyllum exsertum* Griseb.
- Rhytidophyllum lomense* (Urb.) C.V.Morton – south-central Cuba
- Rhytidophyllum minus* Urb.
- Rhytidophyllum rhodocalyx* Urb.
- Rhytidophyllum rupincola* (Urb.) C.V.Morton – western Cuba

== Gleicheniaceae ==
- Dicranopteris flexuosa (Schrad.) Underw.
- Diplopterygium bancroftii (Hook.) A.R.Sm.
- Gleichenella pectinata (Willd.) Ching
- Sticherus antillensis J.Gonzales
- Sticherus bifidus (Willd.) Ching
- Sticherus cubensis* (Underw.) J.Gonzales
- Sticherus fulvus (Desv.) Ching
- Sticherus furcatus (L.) Ching
- Sticherus jamaicensis (Underw.) Nakai
- Sticherus × leonis* (Maxon) J.Gonzales (S. ferrugineus × S. furcatus) – southeastern Cuba
- Sticherus underwoodianus (Maxon) Nakai

== Goodeniaceae ==
- Scaevola plumieri (L.) Vahl
- Scaevola wrightii* (Griseb.) M.Gómez

== Haemodoraceae ==
- Cubanicula* Hopper
  - Cubanicula xanthorrhizos* (C.Wright ex Griseb.) Hopper – western Cuba incl. I. de la Juventud
- Lachnanthes caroliana (Lam.) Dandy
- Xiphidium caeruleum Aubl.

== Haloragaceae ==
- Myriophyllum heterophyllum Michx.
- Myriophyllum laxum Shuttlew. ex Chapm.
- Myriophyllum pinnatum (Walter) Britton
- † Myriophyllum sparsiflorum* C.Wright – western Cuba; last recorded in 1868
- Proserpinaca palustris L.
- Proserpinaca pectinata Lam.

== Heliconiaceae ==
- Heliconia caribaea Lam.

== Hernandiaceae ==
- Hernandia cubensis* Griseb.
- Hernandia sonora L.

== Hydrocharitaceae ==
- Halophila decipiens Ostenf.
- Halophila engelmannii Asch.
- Hydrocharis laevigata (Humb. & Bonpl. ex Willd.) Byng & Christenh.
- Najas arguta Kunth
- Najas conferta (A.Braun) A.Braun
- Najas guadalupensis (Spreng.) Magnus
- Najas marina L.
- Najas wrightiana A.Braun
- Thalassia testudinum Banks & Sol. ex K.D.Koenig
- Vallisneria neotropicalis Vict.

== Hydroleaceae ==
- Hydrolea nigricaulis C.Wright ex Griseb.
- Hydrolea spinosa L.

== Hymenophyllaceae ==
- Hymenophyllum abruptum Hook.
- Hymenophyllum asplenioides (Sw.) Sw.
- Hymenophyllum axillare Sw.
- Hymenophyllum brevifrons Kunze
- Hymenophyllum brevistipes Liebm.
- Hymenophyllum crispum Kunth
- Hymenophyllum elegans Spreng.
- Hymenophyllum elegantulum Bosch
- Hymenophyllum fragile (Hedw.) C.V.Morton
- Hymenophyllum fucoides (Sw.) Sw.
- Hymenophyllum hirsutum (L.) Sw.
- Hymenophyllum hirtellum Sw.
- Hymenophyllum lanatum Fée
- Hymenophyllum lineare (Sw.) Sw.
- Hymenophyllum microcarpum Desv.
- Hymenophyllum paucicarpum Jenman
- Hymenophyllum polyanthos (Sw.) Sw.
- Hymenophyllum proctoris C.Sánchez
- Hymenophyllum sericeum (Sw.) Sw.
- Hymenophyllum turquinense* C.Sánchez – southeastern Cuba
- Hymenophyllum undulatum (Sw.) Sw.
- Hymenophyllum urbani Brause
- Trichomanes alatum Sw.
- Trichomanes angustatum Carmich.
- Trichomanes angustifrons (Fée) Wess.Boer
- Trichomanes bissei* C.Sánchez – southeastern Cuba
- Trichomanes caluffii* C.Sánchez
- Trichomanes capillaceum L.
- Trichomanes crinitum Sw.
- Trichomanes crispum L.
- Trichomanes ekmanii Wess.Boer
- Trichomanes galeottii E.Fourn.
- Trichomanes godmanii Hook. ex Baker
- Trichomanes holopterum Kunze
- Trichomanes hookeri C.Presl
- Trichomanes hymenoides Hedw.
- Trichomanes hymenophylloides Bosch
- Trichomanes kapplerianum J.W.Sturm
- Trichomanes krausii Hook. & Grev.
- Trichomanes lineolatum (Bosch) Hook.
- Trichomanes membranaceum L.
- Trichomanes micropubescens Proctor
- Trichomanes osmundoides DC. ex Poir.
- Trichomanes ovale (E.Fourn.) Wess.Boer
- Trichomanes padronii Proctor
- Trichomanes pinnatum Hedw.
- Trichomanes polypodioides L.
- Trichomanes pusillum Sw.
- Trichomanes pyxidiferum L.
- Trichomanes radicans Sw.
- Trichomanes reptans Sw.
- Trichomanes rigidum Sw.
- Trichomanes robustum E.Fourn.
- Trichomanes scandens L.
- Trichomanes sphenoides Kunze

== Hypericaceae ==
- Hypericum arenarioides* A.Rich. – western and west-central Cuba
- Hypericum diosmoides Griseb.
- Hypericum fasciculatum Lam.
- Hypericum hypericoides (L.) Crantz
- Hypericum incurvum* Urb. – western and central Cuba
- Hypericum limosum* Griseb. – western Cuba
- Hypericum moaense* (Lippold) Panfet – eastern Cuba
- Hypericum nitidum Lam.
- Hypericum styphelioides* A.Rich. – western Cuba incl. I. de la Juventud
- Hypericum tetrapetalum Lam. – western Cuba and southeastern United States

== Hypoxidaceae ==
- Curculigo scorzonerifolia (Lam.) Baker
- Hypoxis decumbens L.
- Hypoxis wrightii (Baker) Brackett

== Icacinaceae ==
- Mappia racemosa Jacq.

== Iridaceae ==
- Cipura insularis* Ravenna – western Cuba
- Cipura paludosa Aubl.
- Eleutherine bulbosa (Mill.) Urb.
- Sisyrinchium miamiense E.P.Bicknell

== Isoetaceae ==
- Isoetes cubana Engelm. ex Baker

== Juglandaceae ==
- Juglans jamaicensis C.DC. (synonym Juglans insularis* Griseb.)

== Juncaceae ==
- Juncus biflorus Elliott
- Juncus bufonius L.
- Juncus marginatus Rostk.
- Juncus repens Michx.

== Juncaginaceae ==
- Triglochin striata Ruiz & Pav.

== Lamiaceae ==
- Aegiphila elata Sw.
- Aegiphila martinicensis Jacq.
- Callicarpa americana L.
- Callicarpa areolata* Urb. – eastern Cuba
- Callicarpa bucheri* Moldenke – eastern Cuba
- Callicarpa crassinervis* Urb. – eastern Cuba
- Callicarpa cubensis* Urb. – western Cuba
- Callicarpa cuneifolia* Britton & P.Wilson – eastern Cuba
- Callicarpa ekmanii* I.E.Méndez & Mabb. – eastern Cuba
- Callicarpa ferruginea Sw. – eastern Cuba and Jamaica
- Callicarpa fulva* A.Rich. – eastern Cuba
- Callicarpa gibaroana* Baro & P.Herrera
- Callicarpa grisebachii* Urb. – eastern Cuba
- Callicarpa hitchcockii Millsp.
- Callicarpa lancifolia* Millsp. – eastern Cuba
- Callicarpa leonis* Moldenke – eastern Cuba (León)
- Callicarpa moana* Borhidi & O.Muñiz – eastern Cuba
- Callicarpa nipensis* Britton & P.Wilson – eastern Cuba
- Callicarpa oblanceolata* Urb. – eastern Cuba
- Callicarpa resinosa* C.Wright & Moldenke – eastern Cuba
- Callicarpa revoluta* Moldenke – eastern Cuba
- Callicarpa roigii* Britton – western Cuba
- Callicarpa shaferi* Britton & P.Wilson – western Cuba incl. I. de la Juventad
- Callicarpa toaensis* Borhidi & O.Muñiz
- Callicarpa wrightii* Britton & P.Wilson – eastern Cuba
- Cantinoa americana (Aubl.) Harley & J.F.B.Pastore
- Cantinoa mutabilis (Rich.) Harley & J.F.B.Pastore
- Clinopodium banaoense* (P.Herrera, I.E.Méndez & Bécquer) Melnikov
- Clinopodium brownei (Sw.) Kuntze
- Clinopodium bucheri* (P.Wilson) Harley – eastern Cuba
- Clinopodium ludens (Shinners) A.Pool
- Clinopodium rankiniae* I.E.Méndez
- Clinopodium suborbiculare* (Alain) Greuter & R.Rankin – eastern Cuba
- Clinopodium vimineum (L.) Kuntze
- Condea americana (Poir.) Harley & J.F.B.Pastore – eastern Cuba, Hispaniola, Puerto Rico, Honduras, and southern Mexico
- Condea cubensis* (Urb.) Harley & J.F.B.Pastore – western Cuba
- Condea rivularis* (Britton) Harley & J.F.B.Pastore – central Cuba
- Condea trichopes* (Epling) Harley & J.F.B.Pastore – I. de la Juventud
- Condea verticillata (Jacq.) Harley & J.F.B.Pastore
- Cornutia pyramidata L.
- Cyanocephalus pedalipes* (Griseb.) Harley & J.F.B.Pastore – western Cuba
- Hyptis actinocephala Griseb. – western Cuba and Dominican Republic
- Hyptis alata (Raf.) Shinners
- Hyptis ammotropha* Griseb. – western Cuba
- Hyptis armillata* Epling
- Hyptis atrorubens Poit.
- Hyptis capitata Jacq.
- Hyptis eriocauloides* A.Rich.
- Hyptis havanensis* Britton ex Epling – western and west-central Cuba
- Hyptis lanceolata Poir.
- Hyptis lantanifolia Poit.
- Hyptis microphylla Pohl ex Benth.
- Hyptis minutifolia* Griseb.
- Hyptis pulegioides Pohl ex Benth.
- Hyptis shaferi* Britton – western Cuba
- Hyptis sinuata Pohl ex Benth.
- Marsypianthes chamaedrys (Vahl) Kuntze
- Mesosphaerum pectinatum (L.) Kuntze
- Mesosphaerum suaveolens (L.) Kuntze
- Ocimum campechianum Mill.
- Ovieda anafensis* (Britton & P.Wilson) I.E.Méndez
- Ovieda brachypus* (Urb.) I.E.Méndez
- Ovieda calcicola* (Britton) I.E.Méndez
- Ovieda cubensis* (Schauer) I.E.Méndez
- Ovieda grandiflora* (Hook.) I.E.Méndez – western Cuba
- Ovieda tuberculata* (A.Rich.) I.E.Méndez
- Petitia domingensis Jacq.
- Pseudocarpidium avicennioides* (A.Rich.) Millsp. – eastern Cuba
- Pseudocarpidium ilicifolium* (A.Rich.) Millsp.
- Pseudocarpidium multidens* (Urb.) Moldenke – eastern Cuba
- Pseudocarpidium neglecta* Bisse
- Pseudocarpidium pungens* Britton – eastern Cuba
- Pseudocarpidium rigens* (Griseb.) Britton – eastern Cuba
- Pseudocarpidium shaferi* Britton – eastern Cuba
- Pseudocarpidium wrightii Millsp.
- Salvia coccinea Buc'hoz ex Etl.
- Salvia cubensis* Britton & P.Wilson – eastern Cuba
- Salvia misella Kunth
- Salvia occidentalis Sw.
- Salvia scabrata* Britton & P.Wilson – Sierra de Moa
- Salvia serotina L.
- Salvia speirematoides* C.Wright – eastern Cuba
- Salvia strobilanthoides* C.Wright ex Griseb. – eastern Cuba
- Salvia toaensis* Alain
- Scutellaria havanensis Jacq.
- Scutellaria holguinensis* I.E.Méndez
- Teucrium canadense L.
- Teucrium cubense Jacq.
- Teucrium vesicarium Mill.
- Vitex acunae* Borhidi & O.Muñiz
- Vitex clementis* Britton & P.Wilson – eastern Cuba
- Vitex divaricata Sw.
- Vitex guanahacabibensis* Borhidi
- Vitex heptaphylla A.Juss.
- Vitex praetervisa* Borhidi
- Vitex tomentulosa* Moldenke
- Vitex urbanii (Ekman) Bramley – eastern Cuba and Haiti (Tortuga)
- Volkameria aculeata L.

== Lauraceae ==
- Aiouea grisebachii (Lorea-Hern.) Rohwer
- Aiouea montana (Sw.) R.Rohde
- Cassytha filiformis L.
- Beilschmiedia pendula (Sw.) Hemsl.
- Damburneya coriacea (Sw.) Trofimov & Rohwer
- Damburneya minima* (Rohwer) Trofimov (synonym Nectandra minima Rohwer)
- Damburneya patens (Sw.) Trofimov
- Licaria cubensis* (O.C.Schmidt) Kosterm. – eastern Cuba
- Licaria triandra (Sw.) Kosterm.
- Nectandra hihua (Ruiz & Pav.) Rohwer
- Nectandra membranacea (Sw.) Griseb.
- Nectandra turbacensis (Kunth) Nees
- Ocotea acunana* Bisse – south-central Cuba (Pico Porterillo)
- Ocotea baracoensis* Borhidi & Imkhan. – eastern Cuba
- Ocotea bissei* Imkhan. – southeastern Cuba
- Ocotea bucheri* Roíg & Acuña – eastern Cuba
- Ocotea cristalensis* Bisse – eastern Cuba
- Ocotea cuneata (Griseb.) M.Gómez
- Ocotea ekmanii* O.C.Schmidt – south-central and southeastern Cuba
- Ocotea floribunda (Sw.) Mez
- Ocotea foeniculacea Mez
- Ocotea leucoxylon (Sw.) Laness.
- Ocotea libanensis* Bisse – eastern Cuba (Mt. Cristi)
- Ocotea moaensis* Bisse – eastern Cuba
- Ocotea reticularis* (Britton & P.Wilson) Alain – eastern Cuba
- Ocotea spathulata Mez – eastern Cuba and Puerto Rico
- Ocotea wrightii (Meisn.) Mez
- Persea hypoleuca (A.Rich.) Mez
- Persea krugii Mez

== Lentibulariaceae ==
- Genlisea filiformis A.St.-Hil.
- Pinguicula albida* C.Wright ex Griseb. – western Cuba
- Pinguicula baezensis* Casper
- Pinguicula benedicta* Barnhart – eastern Cuba (Sierra de Moa)
- Pinguicula bissei* Casper – eastern Cuba
- Pinguicula caryophyllacea* Casper (synonym Pinguicula toldensis* Casper) – eastern Cuba
- Pinguicula cubensis* Urquiola & Casper – western Cuba
- Pinguicula filifolia* C.Wright ex Griseb. – western Cuba incl. I. de la Juventud
- Pinguicula infundibuliformis* Casper – eastern Cuba (Sierra de Moa)
- Pinguicula jackii* Barnhart – southern Cuba
- Pinguicula jaraguana* Casper – eastern Cuba (Sierra de Moa)
- Pinguicula lignicola* Barnhart – eastern Cuba
- Pinguicula lippoldii* Casper – eastern Cuba (Sierra del Cristal)
- Pinguicula lithophytica* Panfet & P.Temple – southern Cuba
- Pinguicula moaensis* Casper – Sierra de Moa
- Pinguicula orthoceras* Casper
- Utricularia breviscapa C.Wright ex Griseb.
- Utricularia cornuta Michx.
- Utricularia foliosa L.
- Utricularia gibba L.
- Utricularia hydrocarpa Vahl
- Utricularia incisa* (A.Rich.) Alain – western Cuba
- Utricularia juncea Vahl
- Utricularia olivacea C.Wright ex Griseb.
- Utricularia purpurea Walter
- Utricularia pusilla Vahl
- Utricularia resupinata B.D.Greene ex Bigelow
- Utricularia simulans Pilg.
- Utricularia subulata L.

== Linaceae ==
- Linum cubense* Bisse

== Linderniaceae ==
- Lindernia alterniflora* (C.Wright) Alain
- Lindernia dubia (L.) Pennell
- Lindernia multicaulis* (Urb.) Alain
- Micranthemum arenarioides* (Griseb.) M.Gómez
- Micranthemum bryoides* (Griseb.) M.Gómez
- Micranthemum callitrichoides (Griseb.) C.Wright
- Micranthemum erosum* (Griseb.) Eb.Fisch.
- Micranthemum longipes* (Urb.) Acev.-Rodr.
- Micranthemum reflexum* (C.Wright ex Griseb.) C.Wright
- Micranthemum rotundatum* Griseb.
- Micranthemum tetrandrum* C.Wright
- Micranthemum umbrosum (J.F.Gmel.) S.F.Blake

== Lindsaeaceae ==
- Lindsaea antillensis (K.U.Kramer) ined.
- Lindsaea arcuata Kunze
- Lindsaea cubensis* Underw. & Maxon – Cuba incl. I. de la Juventud
- Lindsaea lancea (L.) Bedd.
- Lindsaea stricta (Sw.) Dryand.
- Lindsaea subalata (K.U.Kramer) A.Rojas & Tejero
- Odontosoria aculeata (L.) J.Sm.
- Odontosoria jenmanii Maxon – eastern Cuba and Jamaica
- Odontosoria reyesii* Caluff – southeastern Cuba
- Odontosoria scandens (Desv.) C.Chr. – eastern Cuba, Hispaniola, and Puerto Rico
- Odontosoria wrightiana* Maxon – Cuba incl. I. de la Juventud
- Sphenomeris clavata (L.) Maxon

== Loasaceae ==
- Mentzelia aspera L.

== Loganiaceae ==
- Mitreola petiolata (J.F.Gmel.) Torr. & A.Gray
- Spigelia ambigua* C.Wright – western Cuba
- Spigelia anthelmia L.
- Spigelia guianensis (Aubl.) Lemée ex R.A.Howard
- Spigelia sphagnicola* C.Wright – western Cuba
- Strychnos grayi Griseb.

== Lonchitidaceae ==
- Lonchitis hirsuta L.

== Loranthaceae ==
- Dendropemon acutifolius* Urb. – southeastern Cuba
- Dendropemon confertiflorus (Krug & Urb.) Leiva & I.Arias
- Dendropemon lepidotus* (Krug & Urb.) Leiva & I.Arias
- Dendropemon longipes* Urb. – southeastern Cuba
- Dendropemon platypus* Urb. – central and eastern Cuba
- Dendropemon purpureus (L.) Krug & Urb.

== Lycopodiaceae ==
- Huperzia aqualupiana (Spring) Rothm.
- Huperzia dichotoma (Jacq.) Trevis.
- Huperzia funiformis (Bory ex Brongn.) Trevis.
- Huperzia linifolia (L.) Trevis.
- Huperzia pithyoides (Schltdl. & Cham.) Holub
- Huperzia reflexa (Lam.) Trevis
- Huperzia serrata (Thunb.) Trevis.
- Huperzia taxifolia (Sw.) Trevis.
- Huperzia verticillata (L.f.) Trevis.
- Lycopodiella alopecuroides (L.) Cranfill
- Lycopodiella appressa (Chapm.) Cranfill
- Lycopodiella cernua (L.) Pic.Serm.
- Lycopodiella pseudocurvata (B.Øllg.) Greuter & R.Rankin

== Lythraceae ==
- Ammannia auriculata Willd.
- Ammannia coccinea Rottb.
- Ammannia latifolia L.
- Cuphea decandra W.T.Aiton
- Cuphea lobelioides Griseb. – western and central Cuba
- Cuphea melanium (L.) Cramer
- Cuphea micrantha Kunth
- Cuphea mimuloides Schltdl. & Cham.
- Cuphea parsonsia (L.) R.Br. ex Steud.
- Cuphea pseudosilene Griseb. – western and west-central Cuba, incl. I. de la Juventud
- Ginoria americana* Jacq.
- Ginoria arborea* Britton – southeastern Cuba
- Ginoria curvispina* Koehne
- Ginoria ginorioides* (Griseb.) Britton
- Ginoria glabra* Griseb. – southeastern Cuba
- Ginoria koehneana* Urb. – western and eastern Cuba
- Lythrum alatum Pursh
- Lythrum lineare L.
- Rotala mexicana Schltdl. & Cham.
- Rotala ramosior (L.) Koehne

== Magnoliaceae ==
- Magnolia acunae* (Imkhan.) Palmarola & Testé – south-central Cuba (Guamuhaya massif)
- Magnolia cacuminicola* Bisse – southeastern Cuba
- Magnolia cristalensis* Bisse – eastern Cuba
- Magnolia cubensis* Urb. - southeastern Cuba
- Magnolia minor* (Urb.) Govaerts – eastern Cuba
- Magnolia oblongifolia* (León) Palmarola – eastern Cuba
- Magnolia orbiculata* (Britton & P.Wilson) Palmarola – southeastern Cuba
- Magnolia virginiana L.
  - Magnolia virginiana subsp. oviedoae* Palmarola, M.S.Romanov & A.V.Bobrov – Cuba (northern Matanzas)

== Malpighiaceae ==
- Banisteriopsis pauciflora* (Kunth) C.B.Rob.
- Bunchosia articulata* Dobson – western and central Cuba
- Bunchosia emarginata* Regel – western Cuba
- Bunchosia linearifolia* Dobson – east-central and eastern Cuba
- Bunchosia nitida (Jacq.) DC.
- Bunchosia swartziana Griseb.
- Byrsonima bucherae* Moldenke – eastern Cuba
- Byrsonima coccolobifolia Kunth
- Byrsonima crassifolia L. – Nance
- Byrsonima cuneata* (Turcz.) P.Wilson – eastern Cuba
- Byrsonima lucida (Mill.) DC.
- Byrsonima moensis* Acuña & Roíg – eastern Cuba
- Byrsonima × motembensis* Britton & Small (B. crassifolia × B. lucida)
- Byrsonima orientensis* Bisse – southeastern Cuba
- Byrsonima parvifolia* Alain – eastern Cuba
- Byrsonima pinetorum* Griseb. – western Cuba
- Byrsonima roigii* Urb.
- Byrsonima spicata (Cav.) Rich. ex Kunth
- Byrsonima wrightiana* Nied. – western Cuba
- Heladena echinata* (Griseb.) R.F.Almeida & M.Pell. (synonym Henleophytum echinatum*)
- Heteropterys laurifolia (L.) A.Juss.
- Heteropterys purpurea (L.) Kunth
- Malpighia acunana* Borhidi & O.Muñiz – southeastern Cuba
- Malpighia apiculata* Urb. – eastern Cuba
- Malpighia aquifolia L.
- Malpighia arborescens* F.K.Mey. – southeastern Cuba
- Malpighia articulata* F.K.Mey. – Sierra Cristal
- Malpighia aurea* F.K.Mey. – west-central Cuba
- Malpighia bahamensis F.K.Mey.
- Malpighia baracoensis* F.K.Mey. – eastern Cuba
- Malpighia bissei* F.K.Mey. – eastern Cuba
- Malpighia cajalbanensis* F.K.Mey. – western Cuba (Cajálbana)
- Malpighia caribaea* F.K.Mey. – southeastern Cuba
- Malpighia coccigera L.
- Malpighia cornistipulata* F.K.Mey. – eastern Cuba
- Malpighia cristalensis* (F.K.Mey.) F.K.Mey. – Sierra Cristal
- Malpighia cubensis Kunth
- Malpighia cuneiformis* F.K.Mey. – western Cuba
- Malpighia dura* F.K.Mey. – eastern Cuba
- Malpighia epedunculata* F.K.Mey. – east-central and eastern Cuba
- Malpighia erinacea* F.K.Mey. – northwestern Cuba
- Malpighia fucata Ker Gawl.
- Malpighia glabra L.
- Malpighia habanensis* F.K.Mey. – northwestern Cuba
- Malpighia horrida* Small – western Cuba incl. I. de la Junventud
- Malpighia incana Mill.
- Malpighia infestissima* (L.C.Rich. ex A.Juss.) Nied.
- Malpighia jaguensis* F.K.Mey. – west-central Cuba
- Malpighia linearifolia* F.K.Mey. – eastern Cuba
- Malpighia linearis Jacq.
- Malpighia longifolia* F.K.Mey. – eastern Cuba
- Malpighia manacensis* F.K.Mey. – west-central Cuba
- Malpighia martiana* Acuña & Roíg – eastern Cuba
- Malpighia megacantha (A.Juss.) Urb.
- Malpighia meyeriana* P.A.González – eastern Cuba
- Malpighia montecristensis* F.K.Mey. – eastern Cuba
- Malpighia mucronata* F.K.Mey. – western and northwestern Cuba
- Malpighia mutabilis* F.K.Mey. – southeastern Cuba
- Malpighia neglecta* F.K.Mey. – southeastern Cuba
- Malpighia nummulariifolia* Nied. – central and east-central Cuba
- Malpighia ophiticola* F.K.Mey. – central Cuba
- Malpighia pallidior* F.K.Mey. – southeastern Cuba
- Malpighia pasorealensis* F.K.Mey. – western Cuba
- Malpighia racemiflora* F.K.Mey. – southeastern Cuba (Siboney)
- Malpighia racemosa* F.K.Mey. – eastern Cuba (Río Jauco)
- Malpighia revoluta* F.K.Mey. – eastern Cuba (Sabanilla)
- Malpighia reyensis* F.K.Mey. – Sierra de Nipe
- Malpighia roigiana* Borhidi & O.Muñiz – western Cuba
- Malpighia serpentinicola* F.K.Mey. – northwestern Cuba
- Malpighia setosa* Spreng. – northeastern and eastern Cuba, Hispaniola, and Puerto Rico
- Malpighia squarrosa* F.K.Mey. – southeastern Cuba
- Malpighia suberosa* Small
- Malpighia subpilosa* F.K.Mey. – eastern Cuba
- Malpighia torulosa* F.K.Mey. – eastern Cuba
- Malpighia tunensis* F.K.Mey. – eastern Cuba
- Malpighia variifolia* Turcz.
- Malpighia verruculosa W.R.Anderson
- Malpighia vertientensis* F.K.Mey. – east-central Cuba
- Malpighia wrightiana* Acuña & Roíg – western Cuba
- Mascagnia adamsii W.R.Anderson & C.Davis
- Mascagnia brittonii* Small – southeastern Cuba
- Mascagnia buchii Urb. & Nied.
- Mascagnia lucida (Kunth) W.R.Anderson & C.Davis
  - Mascagnia lucida subsp. orientensis* P.A.González – eastern Cuba
- Mascagnia nana* (Nied.) P.A.González – east-central Cuba
- Spachea elegans (G.Mey.) A.Juss
- Spachea martiana* Acuña & Roig – eastern Cuba
- Stigmaphyllon bannisterioides (L.) C.E.Anderson
- Stigmaphyllon coccolobifolium* Alain – southeastern Cuba
- Stigmaphyllon diversifolium* (Kunth) A.Juss.
- Stigmaphyllon microphyllum* Griseb.
- Stigmaphyllon nipense* Alain – eastern Cuba
- Stigmaphyllon sagraeanum* A.Juss.
- Tetrapterys aequalis C.Wright – southeastern Cuba and Haiti
- Tetrapterys buxifolia Cav.

== Malvaceae ==
- Abelmoschus esculentus (L.) Moench
- Abelmoschus moschatus Medik.
- Abutilon abutiloides (Jacq.) Garcke ex Hochr.
- Abutilon bivalve (Cav.) Dorr
- Abutilon buchii Urb.
- Abutilon giganteum (Jacq.) Sweet
- Abutilon hirtum (Lam.) Sweet
- Abutilon hulseanum (Torr. & A.Gray) Torr. ex Baker f.
- Abutilon inclusum Urb.
- Abutilon indicum (L.) Sweet
- Abutilon mollissimum (Cav.) Sweet
- Abutilon permolle (Willd.) Sweet
- Abutilon theophrasti Medik.
- Abutilon trisulcatum (Jacq.) Urb.
- Abutilon viscosum (L.) Dorr
- Allobriquetia spicata (Kunth) Bovini
- Allosidastrum pyramidatum (Desp. ex Cav.) Krapov.
- Anoda acerifolia Cav.
- Anoda cristata (L.) Schltdl.
- Ayenia ardua Cristóbal
- Ayenia cajalbanensis* Alain
- Ayenia cubensis* A.Rodr.
- Ayenia euphrasiifolia Griseb.
  - Ayenia euphrasiifolia subsp. litoralis* A.Rodr.
  - Ayenia euphrasiifolia subsp. ophiticola* A.Rodr.
- Ayenia insulicola Cristóbal
- Ayenia scorpiura (C.Wright ex Griseb.) ined.
- Ayenia spinosa* A.Rodr. & Bisse
- Ayenia tenuicaulis Urb.
- Ayenia velutina* Urb. – eastern Cuba
- Ayenia violacea Urb.
- Ayenia virgata Urb. & Ekman
- Berrya cordifolia (Willd.) Burret
- Blanchardia clypeata (L.) M.M.Hanes & R.L.Barrett
  - Blanchardia clypeata subsp. cryptocarpa (A.Rich.) M.M.Hanes & R.L.Barrett
- Bombax ceiba L.
- Carpodiptera cubensis Griseb.
  - Carpodiptera cubensis subsp. cubensis (synonym C. mirabilis* Bisse)
  - Carpodiptera cubensis subsp. ophiticola* (Bisse) A.Rodr. (synonym C. ophiticola* Bisse)
- Ceiba pentandra (L.) Gaertn.
- Cienfuegosia heterophylla (Vent.) Garcke
- Cienfuegosia yucatanensis Millsp.
- Corchorus aestuans L.
- Corchorus foliosus* Spreng.
- Corchorus hirsutus L.
- Corchorus hirtus L.
- Corchorus orinocensis Kunth
- Corchorus siliquosus L.
- Gaya occidentalis (L.) Sweet
- Guazuma invira (Willd.) G.Don
- Guazuma ulmifolia Lam.
- Helicteres calcicola* Alain
- Helicteres guazumifolia Kunth
- Helicteres jamaicensis Jacq.
- Helicteres semitriloba Bertero ex DC.
- Helicteres trapezifolia A.Rich.
- Herissantia crispa (L.) Brizicky
- Hibiscus bifurcatus Cav.
- Hibiscus cordifolius* Mill.
- Hibiscus costatus A.Rich.
- Hibiscus elatus Sw. – blue mahoe
- Hibiscus furcellatus Desr.
- Hibiscus grandiflorus Michx.
- Hibiscus maculatus Lam. – southwestern and eastern Cuba, Hispaniola, and western Colombia
  - Hibiscus maculatus subsp. maculatus – southwestern Cuba, Hispaniola, and western Colombia
  - Hibiscus maculatus subsp. nipensis* (Carabia) F.Areces – eastern Cuba (Sierra de Nipe)
- Hibiscus phoeniceus Jacq.
- Hibiscus poeppigii (Spreng.) Garcke
- Hibiscus sororius L.
- Hibiscus striatus Cav.
- Hibiscus tiliaceus L.
- Hibiscus trilobus Aubl.
- Hildegardia cubensis* (Urb.) Kosterm.
- Kosteletzkya depressa (L.) O.J.Blanch., Fryxell & D.M.Bates
- Kosteletzkya pentacarpos (L.) Ledeb.
- Luehea macrophylla Pohl
- Malachra alceifolia Jacq.
- Malachra capitata (L.) L.
- Malachra fasciata Jacq.
- Malachra radiata (L.) L.
- Malachra urens Poit. ex Ledeb.
- Malvastrum americanum (L.) Torr.
- Malvastrum corchorifolium (Desr.) Britton ex Small
- Malvastrum coromandelianum (L.) Garcke
- Melochia arenosa Benth.
- Melochia bissei* A.Rodr.
- Melochia nodiflora Sw.
- Melochia parvifolia Kunth
- Melochia pyramidata L.
- Melochia savannarum Britton
- Melochia siphonandra (Turcz.) Dorr
- Melochia spicata (L.) Fryxell
- Melochia tomentosa L.
- Neoregnellia cubensis Urb.
- Ochroma pyramidale (Cav. ex Lam.) Urb.
- Pachira cubensis (A.Robyns) Fern.Alonso – western Cuba
- Pachira emarginata A.Rich.
- Pavonia achanioides* Griseb.
- Pavonia calcicola* (Britton) Ekman
- Pavonia cryptocalyx* Urb.
- Pavonia fruticosa (Mill.) Fawc. & Rendle
- Pavonia heterostemon* Urb.
- Pavonia intermixta* A.Rich.
- Pavonia malacophylla (Link & Otto) Garcke
- Pavonia paludicola Nicolson ex Fryxell
- Pavonia schiedeana Steud.
- Pavonia spinifex (L.) Cav.
- Peltaea speciosa (Kunth) Standl.
- Peltaea subpandurata* (C.Wright ex Griseb.) Krapov. & Cristóbal
- Peltaea trinervis (C.Presl) Krapov. & Cristóbal
- Pseudabutilon umbellatum (L.) Fryxell
- Pseudobombax ellipticum (Kunth) Dugand
- Sida abutilifolia Mill.
- Sida acuta Burm.f.
- Sida antillensis Urb.
- Sida brittonii León
- Sida ciliaris L.
- Sida cordifolia L.
- Sida glabra Mill.
- Sida glomerata Cav.
- Sida glutinosa Comm. ex Cav.
- Sida hederifolia Cav.
- Sida hyssopifolia C.Presl
- Sida jamaicensis L.
- Sida linifolia Juss. ex Cav.
- Sida nummularia* Baker f.
- Sida spinosa L.
- Sida ulmifolia Mill.
- Sida urens L.
- Sidastrum multiflorum (Jacq.) Fryxell
- Sidastrum paniculatum (L.) Fryxell
- Tetralix* Griseb.
  - Tetralix brachypetalus* Griseb.
  - Tetralix cristalensis* Bisse
  - Tetralix jaucoensis* Bisse
  - Tetralix moaensis* Bisse
  - Tetralix nipensis* Urb.
- Thespesia cubensis* (Britton & P.Wilson) J.B.Hutch.
- Trichospermum lessertianum (Hochr.) Dorr
- Triumfetta bogotensis DC.
- Triumfetta grandiflora Vahl
- Triumfetta lappula L.
- Triumfetta semitriloba Jacq.
- Urena lobata L.
- Waltheria arenicola* A.Rodr.
- Waltheria glabra Poir.
- Waltheria indica L.
- Waltheria microphylla* Cav.
- Wissadula caribaea (DC.) Bovini
- Wissadula excelsior (Cav.) C.Presl
- Wissadula fadyenii R.E.Fr.
- Wissadula periplocifolia (L.) Thwaites

== Marantaceae ==
- Goeppertia allouia (Aubl.) Borchs. & S.Suárez
- Maranta arundinacea L.
- Thalia geniculata L.

== Marattiaceae ==
- Danaea geniculata Raddi
- Danaea jenmanii Underw.
- Danaea nodosa (L.) Sm.
- Eupodium laeve (Sm.) Murdock
- Marattia alata Sw.

== Marcgraviaceae ==
- Marcgravia evenia* Krug & Urb.
- Marcgravia oligandra C.Wright ex Griseb.
- Marcgravia rectiflora Triana & Planch.

== Marsileaceae ==
- Marsilea polycarpa Hook. & Grev.

== Martyniaceae ==
- Martynia annua L.

== Mayacaceae ==
- Mayaca fluviatilis Aubl.

== Melastomataceae ==
- Acisanthera quadrata Juss. ex Poir
- Arthrostemma ciliatum Pav. ex D.Don
- Arthrostemma cubense* A.Rich.
- Chaetogastra longifolia (Vahl) DC.
- Graffenrieda chrysandra Triana
- Graffenrieda rufescens Britton & P.Wilson
- Henriettea acunae* (Alain) Alain – eastern Cuba
- Henriettea cuabae* ((Urb.) Borhidi
- Henriettea ekmanii* ((Urb.) Alain – southeastern Cuba
- Henriettea fascicularis (Sw.) M.Gómez
- Henriettea gibberosa* (Urb.) Alain – southeastern Cuba
- Henriettea macfadyenii (Triana) Alain
- Henriettea patrisiana DC.
- Henriettea punctata* (Griseb.) M.Gómez
- Henriettea ramiflora (Sw.) DC. (synonym Henriettea granularis* (Urb.) Alain)
- Henriettea sierrae* Carmenate & Bécquer – southeastern Cuba
- Henriettea squamata* (Alain) Alain – western Cuba
- Meriania albiflora* Carmenate & Michelang.
- Meriania angustifolia* (Cogn.) Carmenate & Michelang.
- Miconia acunae Borhidi
- Miconia acunagalei Judd – eastern Cuba
- Miconia albicans (Sw.) Steud.
- Miconia alternifolia* (Griseb.) Alain
- Miconia ancistrophora* Triana
- Miconia androsaemifolia* Griseb.
- Miconia angulata* (Griseb.) M.Gómez
- Miconia angustifolia (Sw.) Griseb.
- Miconia argentimuricata Majure & Judd
- Miconia ascenditricha Judd, Bécquer & Majure – southeastern Cuba
- Miconia asperifolia* (Naudin) Majure & Judd
- Miconia aurifolia* Bécquer & Judd
- Miconia baillonii M.Gómez
- Miconia baracoana* M.Gómez – eastern Cuba
- Miconia barbata* (Borhidi) Judd, Bécquer & Majure
- Miconia becqueri* Judd & Majure
- Miconia bicolor (Mill.) Triana
- Miconia bissei* (Bécquer) Bécquer & Michelang.
- Miconia bisulcata* Urb.
- Miconia borhidiana* Judd – eastern Cuba
- Miconia brachycentra* (Griseb.) M.Gómez
- Miconia brachyloba* (Urb.) Bécquer – I. de la Juventud
- Miconia brachystemon* (Urb.) Judd, Bécquer & Majure – southeastern Cuba
- Miconia brunescens* (Urb.) Bécquer & Skean
- Miconia bullotricha* Bécquer & Majure
- Miconia cajalbanensis* Judd
- Miconia calycina Cogn.
- Miconia calycopteris* (Rich.) Judd, Bécquer & Majure
- Miconia capillaris* (Sw.) M.Gómez
- Miconia capillinervis* Ionta & Judd
- Miconia cerasiflora* Urb. – eastern Cuba
- Miconia charleswrightii* Bécquer & Judd
- Miconia clementiana* (Britton) Bécquer & Majure
- Miconia clementii* (P.Wilson ex Britton) Bécquer
- Miconia conica* Skean, Judd & Majure
- Miconia costata* (Urb.) Judd, Bécquer & Majure – eastern Cuba
- Miconia crenata (Vahl) Michelang.
- Miconia cristalensis* (Borhidi) Judd
- Miconia cubacinerea* Majure & Judd
- Miconia cubana* (Alain) Majure & Judd
- Miconia cubapinetorum* Bécquer & Majure
- Miconia cubensis* (Griseb.) C.Wright
- Miconia cupeyalensis* Bécquer & Michelang.
- Miconia decorticans* (Bécquer) Bécquer & Majure
- Miconia delicatula* A.Rich.
- Miconia delicatula* A.Rich.
- Miconia discolorata* Bécquer & Michelang.
- Miconia divaricatiflora* Judd & Bécquer
- Miconia dodecandra Cogn.
- Miconia echinata* (Griseb.) Judd, Bécquer & Majure – eastern Cuba
- Miconia ekmanii* (Urb.) Judd – eastern Cuba
- Miconia elata (Sw.) DC.
- Miconia elegantissima* Bécquer & Judd
- Miconia erythropogon (DC.) Judd & Ionta
- Miconia filisepala* (Urb.) Judd – eastern Cuba (Mt. Libano)
- Miconia garciabeltranii* Bécquer & Majure
- Miconia glabrifolia Skean, Judd, Majure & Bécquer
- Miconia grandibracteata* Judd
- Miconia granulata* (Urb.) Majure & Judd
- Miconia grisebachiana* Bécquer & Michelang.
- Miconia guajaibonensis* Judd, Bécquer & Majure
- Miconia haemantha* (Triana ex Cogn.) Skean, Judd & Majure
- Miconia haemanthoides Skean, Judd & Majure
- Miconia heterophylla* (Naudin) M.Gómez
- Miconia hirticalyx* Judd & Bécquer
- Miconia hirtistyla* Majure & Judd
- Miconia hypoglauca* (C.Wright ex Griseb.) Judd – eastern Cuba
- Miconia ibaguensis (Bonpl.) Triana
- Miconia impetiolaris (Sw.) D.Don
- Miconia impressa* (Urb.) Judd, Bécquer & Majure
- Miconia jashaferi* Majure & Judd
- Miconia javorkaeana* Borhidi
- Miconia joseluisii* Bécquer & Majure
- Miconia karsticola* Judd, Bécquer, Skean & Majure
- Miconia laevigata (L.) DC.
- Miconia lanatifolia* Judd, Bécquer & Majure
- Miconia lenticellata* Alain – eastern Cuba
- Miconia leucandra (C.Wright ex Griseb.) Judd & Ionta
- Miconia lima (Desr.) M.Gómez
- Miconia lindeniana* (Naudin) M.Gómez
- Miconia lindmanii* (Urb.) Bécquer
- Miconia liogieri* Bécquer & Michelang.
- Miconia lomensis (Urb.) Michelang.
- Miconia lutgardae* Bécquer & Michelang. – eastern Cuba
- Miconia maestrensis* Judd, Bécquer & Majure – southeastern Cuba
- Miconia mantuensis* (Britton & P.Wilson) Bécquer
- Miconia matosiana* Bécquer & Michelang.
- Miconia matthaei Naudin
- Miconia mayarensis* (Urb.) Bécquer & Michelang.
- Miconia microphylla* (C.Wright) M.Gómez
- Miconia minutiflora (Bonpl.) DC.
- Miconia mirabilis (Aubl.) L.O.Williams
- Miconia moana* (Borhidi & O.Muñiz) Bécquer & Michelang.
- Miconia moensis* (Britton) Alain
- Miconia monocephala* Urb. – eastern Cuba
- Miconia monopleura* (Urb.) Bécquer & Majure
- Miconia munizii* (Borhidi) Ionta & Bécquer
- Miconia navasensis* (Britton & P.Wilson) Ionta & Bécquer
- Miconia neibensis (Skean) Skean, Judd & Majure
  - Miconia neibensis subsp. alainii* (Skean) Skean
  - Miconia neibensis subsp. integrifolia* (Naudin) Skean
- Miconia nipensis* (Britton & P.Wilson) Ionta & Bécquer – eastern Cuba
- Miconia norlindii* (Urb.) Majure & Judd
- Miconia nystroemii* Ekman
- Miconia obtusa* (Griseb.) Triana – eastern Cuba
- Miconia obtusifolia* (Cogn.) Skean, Judd & Majure
- Miconia octona (Bonpl.) Judd & Majure
- Miconia oleifolia* (Griseb.) M.Gómez
- Miconia omissa* Bécquer & Michelang.
- Miconia ottoschmidtii* (Urb.) Majure & Judd
- Miconia ovatifolia* (Urb.) Judd, Bécquer & Majure – eastern Cuba
- Miconia pachyantha Bécquer
- Miconia penninervis* (Griseb.) M.Gómez
- Miconia perelegans* Urb. – I. de la Juventud
- Miconia perezii* (Alain) Bécquer & Michelang.
- Miconia petersonii* Urb.
- Miconia pilifera* (Urb.) Ionta & Bécquer
- Miconia plicata* (Griseb.) M.Gómez
- Miconia poiretii* (Griseb.) M.Gómez
- Miconia prasina (Sw.) DC.
- Miconia pratensis Judd, Bécquer & Majure
- Miconia pseudofloribunda* (Bécquer) Bécquer & Michelang.
- Miconia pseudopedicellata* Judd & Bécquer
- Miconia pseudopinetorum* (Borhidi & O.Muñiz) Judd, Bécquer & Majure – Cuchillas del Toa
- Miconia pteroclada* Urb.
- Miconia pterosepala* Urb.
- Miconia pulverata* Judd, Bécquer & Majure – Sierra del Cobre
- Miconia punctata (Desr.) D.Don ex DC.
- Miconia rangeliana* C.Wright ex Griseb.
- Miconia remotiflora* Urb.
- Miconia rhombifolia* Alain
- Miconia rosalinae* Bécquer, Michelang. & Carmenate
- Miconia rosmarinifolia* (Griseb.) M.Gómez – eastern Cuba
- Miconia rubrinervis* (Naudin) Judd & Bécquer
- Miconia rufa* (Griseb.) Triana
- Miconia ruficaulis* Ionta & Bécquer
- Miconia scabrosa (L.) Ionta, Judd & Skean
- Miconia scalpta (Vent.) Ionta, Judd & Skean
- Miconia secundoangustifolia* M.Gómez
- Miconia secundolanceolata* M.Gómez
- Miconia serrulata (DC.) Naudin
- Miconia shaferi* Cogn.
- Miconia skeaniana* Judd
- Miconia splendens (Sw.) D.Don (Sw.) Griseb.
- Miconia strigillosa (Sw.) D.Don (Sw.) Judd & Ionta
- Miconia subhirsuta (Sw.) D.Don (DC.) M.Gómez
- Miconia susannae* (Borhidi) Bécquer & Michelang.
- Miconia tentaculicapitata* Majure & Judd
- Miconia tetramera* (Urb. & Ekman) Bécquer
- Miconia tetrandra (Sw.) D.Don
- Miconia tetrastoma Naudin
- Miconia tetrazygioidea* Bécquer & Judd
- Miconia tomentosa (Rich.) D.Don
- Miconia trianana* Judd & Bécquer
- Miconia turquinensis* Urb. & Ekman
- Miconia umbellata (Mill.) Judd & Ionta
- Miconia uninervis* Alain – eastern Cuba
- Miconia urceolata* Urb.
- Miconia vazquezii* (Borhidi & O.Muñiz) Ionta & Bécquer
- Miconia victorinii* Alain – eastern Cuba
- Miconia vulcanidomatia Bécquer & Skean
- Miconia walterjuddii* Bécquer & Michelang.
- Miconia wrightiana* (Griseb.) Greuter & R.Rankin
- Miconia wrightii (Griseb.) Triana
- Miconia xalapensis* (Bonpl.) M.Gómez
- Miconia yamanigueyensis* Bécquer & Michelang. – eastern Cuba
- Miconia yunquensis* Judd, Bécquer & Majure – eastern Cuba
- Mouriri emarginata* Griseb.
- Mouriri myrtilloides Poir.
  - Mouriri myrtilloides subsp. acuta* (Griseb.) Morley
- Mouriri spathulata Griseb.
  - Mouriri spathulata var. spathulata*
- Mouriri valenzuelana* A.Rich.
- Nepsera aquatica (Aubl.) Naudin
- Noterophila limnobios (DC.) Mart.
- Ossaea pulchra* Alain
- Ossaea wrightii* Triana
- Rhexia cubensis Griseb.
- Votomita monantha* (Urb.) Morley

== Meliaceae ==
- Carapa guianensis Aubl.
- Cedrela odorata L.
- Guarea guidonia (L.) Sleumer
- Swietenia mahagoni (L.) Jacq. – Cuban mahogany
- Trichilia havanensis Jacq.
- Trichilia hirta L.
- Trichilia pallida Sw.
- Trichilia pungens* Urb. – northeastern Cuba
- Trichilia trachyantha* (Griseb.) C.DC.
- Trichilia trifolia L.

== Menispermaceae ==
- Cissampelos pareira L.
- Hyperbaena axilliflora* (Griseb.) Urb.
- Hyperbaena columbica* (Eichler) Miers
- Hyperbaena cubensis* (Griseb.) Urb.
- Hyperbaena domingensis (DC.) Benth.

== Menyanthaceae ==
- Nymphoides grayana (Griseb.) Kuntze
- Nymphoides humboldtiana (Kunth) Kuntze

== Metteniusaceae ==
- Ottoschulzia cubensis* (C.Wright ex Griseb.) Urb.

== Microteaceae ==
- Microtea debilis Sw.
- Microtea portoricensis Urb.

== Molluginaceae ==
- Glinus radiatus (Ruiz & Pav.) Rohrb.
- Mollugo brevipes* Urb.
- Mollugo cubensis* Urb.
- Mollugo enneandra* C.Wright
- Mollugo pinosia* Urb. – I. de la Juventud
- Mollugo verticillata L.
- Paramollugo cuneifolia* (Griseb.) Thulin
- Paramollugo deltoidea* (León) Thulin
- Paramollugo spathulata (Sw.) Sukhor.

== Moraceae ==
- Brosimum alicastrum Sw.
- Dorstenia crenulata* C.Wright ex Griseb. – eastern Cuba
- Dorstenia erythranda C.Wright ex Griseb. - eastern Cuba and Hispaniola
- Dorstenia lanei* R.A.Howard & W.R.Briggs – Las Villas
- Dorstenia nummularia* Urb. & Ekman – Santa Clara and Las Villas
- Dorstenia peltata Spreng.
- Dorstenia petraea* C.Wright ex Griseb.
- Dorstenia renulata* C.Wright ex Griseb. – eastern Cuba
- Dorstenia rocana* Britton – east-central and eastern Cuba
- Dorstenia roigii* Britton – western Cuba
- Dorstenia tuberosa* C.Wright ex Griseb – eastern Cuba
- Ficus americana Aubl.
- Ficus aurea Nutt.
- Ficus citrifolia Mill.
- Ficus crassinervia Desf. ex Willd.
- Ficus crocata (Miq.) Mart. ex Miq.
- Ficus maxima Mill.
- Ficus membranacea C.Wright – (synonym Ficus meizonochlamys* Rossberg)
- Ficus trigonata L.
- Maclura tinctoria (L.) D.Don ex G.Don
- Pseudolmedia spuria (Sw.) Griseb.
- Trophis racemosa (L.) Urb.

== Myricaceae ==
- Myrica cacuminis* Britton & P.Wilson
- Myrica cerifera L.
- Myrica punctata* Griseb.
- Myrica shaferi Urb. & Britton

== Myrtaceae ==
- Calycolpus vitis-idaea* Greuter & R.Rankin – eastern Cuba
- Eugenia aceitillo* Urb. – eastern Cuba
- Eugenia acrantha* Urb. – eastern Cuba
- Eugenia acunae* Alain – eastern Cuba
- Eugenia acutissima* Urb. & Ekman – northwestern Cuba
- Eugenia aeruginea DC.
- Eugenia alainii* Borhidi
- Eugenia amblyophylla* Urb. – southeastern Cuba
- Eugenia anafensis* Urb. – western Cuba
- Eugenia anthacanthoides* Urb. & Ekman – central and eastern Cuba
- Eugenia asperifolia* O.Berg
- Eugenia atricha* Urb. – western Cuba
- Eugenia axillaris (Sw.) Willd.
- Eugenia banderensis* Urb. – western Cuba
- Eugenia bayatensis* Urb. – eastern Cuba
- Eugenia beyeri* Urb. – Sierra de Nipe
- Eugenia bissei* Flickinger – eastern Cuba
- Eugenia borhidiana* Z.Acosta – Sierra de Moa
- Eugenia brevipes* A.Rich.
- Eugenia cajalbanica* Borhidi & O.Muñiz
- Eugenia canapuensis* Urb. – Sierra de Nipe
- Eugenia catingiflora* Griseb.
- Eugenia ceibana* Urb. – I. de la Juventud
- Eugenia cincta* Griseb. – eastern Cuba
- Eugenia clarensis* Britton & P.Wilson – central Cuba
- Eugenia confusa DC.
- Eugenia cowellii* Britton & P.Wilson
- Eugenia crenulata* (Sw.) Willd. – eastern Cuba and Hispaniola
- Eugenia cristalensis* Urb. – eastern Cuba (Sierra del Cristal)
- Eugenia cristata* C.Wright – western and central Cuba
- Eugenia cupuligera* Urb. – eastern Cuba
- Eugenia cycloidea* Urb. – eastern Cuba
- Eugenia cyphophloea* Griseb.
- Eugenia discolorans* C.Wright – western Cuba
- Eugenia duplicata* Britton & P.Wilson ex Acev.-Rodr. & M.T.Strong – western Cuba
- Eugenia earlei* Britton & P.Wilson – western and central Cuba
- Eugenia eriantha* Urb. – southeastern Cuba
- Eugenia excisa* Urb. – eastern Cuba (Bayate)
- Eugenia farameoides* A.Rich.
- Eugenia galalonensis (C.Wright ex Griseb.) Krug & Urb. – western and central Cuba, southern Mexico to Ecuador
- Eugenia galeata* Urb. – western Cuba
- Eugenia gibberosa* Urb. – eastern Cuba
- Eugenia glabrata (Sw.) DC.
- Eugenia grifensis* Urb. – western Cuba
- Eugenia grisebachii* Krug & Urb. – eastern Cuba
- Eugenia guanensis* Urb. – western Cuba
- Eugenia heterophylla* A.Rich.
- Eugenia ignota* Britton & P.Wilson – I. de la Juventud
- Eugenia iteophylla* Krug & Urb. – eastern Cuba
- Eugenia jambosoides* C.Wright ex Griseb. – western Cuba
- Eugenia laeteviridis* Urb. – southeastern Cuba
- Eugenia libanensis* Urb. – eastern Cuba
- Eugenia ligustroides* Urb. – Sierra de Nipe
- Eugenia lineata* (Sw.) DC. – eastern Cuba and Hispaniola
- Eugenia loeseneri* Urb. – western and west-central Cuba
- Eugenia lomensis* Britton & P.Wilson – southeastern Cuba
- Eugenia lucens* Alain – eastern Cuba (Sierra de Moa)
- Eugenia maestrensis* Urb. – Sierra Maestra
- Eugenia megalopetala* Griseb. – western and west-central Cuba
- Eugenia melanadenia Krug & Urb.
  - Eugenia melanadenia var. santayana Urb. – east-central Cuba
- Eugenia mensurensis* Urb. – Sierra de Nipe
- Eugenia mollifolia* Urb. – western Cuba
- Eugenia monticola (Sw.) DC.
- Eugenia mucronata O.Berg
- Eugenia naguana* Urb. – eastern Cuba
- Eugenia nematopoda* Urb. – Sierra Maestra
- Eugenia nipensis* Urb. – eastern Cuba
- Eugenia nodulosa* Urb. – southeastern Cuba
- Eugenia oligadenia* Urb. – eastern Cuba
- Eugenia oligandra* Krug & Urb. – western and central Cuba
- Eugenia oxysepala* Urb. – southeastern Cuba
- Eugenia pachyadenia* (Urb. & Ekman) Flickinger – central Cuba
- Eugenia papayoensis* Urb. – central and eastern Cuba
- Eugenia peninsularis* Urb. – eastern Cuba
- Eugenia petrophila* Urb. – eastern Cuba
- Eugenia phyllocardia* Urb. – western Cuba
- Eugenia piedraensis* Urb. – eastern Cuba
- Eugenia pinariensis* Urb. – northwestern Cuba
- Eugenia pinetorum* Urb. – eastern Cuba
- Eugenia plicatula* C.Wright
- Eugenia pocsiana* Borhidi
- Eugenia pozasia* Urb. & Ekman – western Cuba
- Eugenia procera (Sw.) Poir
- Eugenia psiloclada* Urb. – eastern Cuba
- Eugenia pteroclada* Urb. – eastern Cuba
- Eugenia punicifolia (Kunth) DC.
- Eugenia ramonae* Borhidi & O.Muñiz
- Eugenia ramoniana* Urb. – western and central Cuba
- Eugenia retinadenia* C.Wright – western Cuba
- Eugenia rhombea (O.Berg) Krug & Urb.
- Eugenia rigidifolia* A.Rich. – western Cuba
- Eugenia rigidula* Britton & P.Wilson – eastern Cuba
- Eugenia rimosa* C.Wright
- Eugenia rocana* Britton & P.Wilson – western Cuba
- Eugenia roigii* Urb. – western Cuba
- Eugenia rosariensis* Borhidi – western Cuba
- Eugenia samuelssonii* Ekman & Urb. – southeastern Cuba
- Eugenia sauvallei* Krug & Urb. – western Cuba
- Eugenia scaphephylla* C.Wright
- Eugenia sebastiani* Urb. – western Cuba
- Eugenia serrei* Urb. – western Cuba
- Eugenia shaferi* Urb. – east-central Cuba
- Eugenia sooiana* Borhidi
- Eugenia stenoptera* Urb. – southeastern Cuba
- Eugenia stenoxipha* Urb. – eastern Cuba
- Eugenia stereophylla* Urb. – Sierra de Nipe
- Eugenia sturrockii* R.A.Howard – Sierra de Moa
- Eugenia subdisticha* Urb. – central Cuba
- Eugenia subspinulosa* Borhidi & O.Muñiz
- Eugenia toaensis* Borhidi & O.Muñiz
- Eugenia tomasina* Urb. – western Cuba
- Eugenia tuberculata* (Kunth) DC.
- Eugenia varia* Britton & P.Wilson – western and west-central Cuba
- Eugenia victorinii* Alain – I. de la Juventud
- Eugenia woodfrediana* Urb. – Sierra de Nipe
- Eugenia xystophylla* O.Berg - western Cuba
- Mosiera acunae* (Borhidi & O.Muñiz) Bisse
- Mosiera araneosa* (Urb.) Bisse – southeastern Cuba
- Mosiera baracoensis* Bisse ex Urquiola & Z.Acosta
- Mosiera bissei* Urquiola & Z.Acosta
- Mosiera bullata* (Britton & P.Wilson) Bisse – central and eastern Cuba
- Mosiera cabanasensis* (Britton & P.Wilson) Borhidi – east-central and eastern Cuba
- Mosiera calycolpoides* (Griseb.) Borhidi – eastern Cuba
- Mosiera del-riscoi* (Borhidi & O.Muñiz) Borhidi
- Mosiera ekmanii* (Urb.) Bisse – eastern Cuba (Sierra de Nipe)
- Mosiera elliptica* (C.Wright) Bisse – central and eastern Cuba
- Mosiera havanensis (Urb.) Bisse – western Cuba
- Mosiera macrophylla* Bisse ex Urquiola & Z.Acosta
- Mosiera × miraflorensis* (Borhidi & O.Muñiz) Borhidi (M. ekmannii × M. ophiticola)
- Mosiera moana* (Borhidi & O.Muñiz) Greuter & R.Rankin
- Mosiera moensis* (Britton & P.Wilson) Bisse – Sierra de Moa
- Mosiera munizii* (Borhidi) Bisse
- Mosiera nipensis* Salywon & Landrum – eastern Cuba
- Mosiera nummularioides* (Britton & P.Wilson) Bisse – eastern Cuba
- Mosiera occidentalis* Bisse ex Urquiola & Z.Acosta
- Mosiera oonophylla* (Urb.) Bisse – southeastern Cuba
- Mosiera wrightii* Borhidi – eastern Cuba
- Mosiera yamaniguensis* Bisse ex Urquiola & Z.Acosta
- Myrcia acunae* Borhidi
- Myrcia adunca* Z.Acosta & K.Samra – eastern Cuba
- Myrcia aerisea* Z.Acosta & K.Samra – western Cuba
- Myrcia arenicola* (Urb.) Z.Acosta & K.Samra
- Myrcia flavoviridis* (Urb.) Z.Acosta & K.Samra
- Myrcia maestrensis* (Urb.) Alain - southeastern Cuba (Sierra Maestra)
- Myrcia manacalensis* Urb. - southeastern Cuba (Sierra Maestra)
- Myrcia polyneura* (Urb.) Borhidi – eastern Cuba (Sierra de Nipe)
- Myrcia pozasiana* (Urb.) Z.Acosta & K.Samra – western Cuba
- Myrcia prolaxa* Z.Acosta & K.Samra – eastern Cuba (Sierra de Nipe)
- Myrcia protracta* (Urb.) Z.Acosta & K.Samra – western Cuba
- Myrcia pseudoapoda* (Bisse & Am.Rodr.) Z.Acosta & K.Samra
- Myrcia pseudomoaensis* (Borhidi & O.Muñiz) Z.Acosta & K.Samra – eastern Cuba
- Myrcia retivenia* (C.Wright) Urb. – eastern Cuba
- Myrcia rhodophylla* (Ekman & Urb.) Z.Acosta & K.Samra – southeastern Cuba
- Myrcia rigida (Sw.) K.Campbell & J.M.A.Braga – eastern Cuba and Jamaica
- Myrcia spinifolia* Borhidi & O.Muñiz
- Myrcia splendensa (Sw.) DC.
- Myrcia subcapitataa* (Urb.) Z.Acosta & K.Samra – eastern Cuba (Sierra de Nipe)
- Myrcia susannae* Borhidi
- Myrcia tenuiclada* Z.Acosta & K.Samra – southeastern Cuba
- Myrcia toaensis* Borhidi & O.Muñiz
- Myrcia tytthoflora* Z.Acosta & K.Samra – eastern Cuba (Sierra de Nipe)
- Myrcia urquiolae* Z.Acosta
- Myrcia valenzuelana* (A.Rich.) Griseb. – western Cuba
- Myrcia yaraensis* (Urb.) Z.Acosta & K.Samra – southeastern Cuba
- Myrcianthes fragrans (Sw.) McVaugh
- Myrciaria floribunda (H.West ex Willd.) O.Berg
- Myrciaria formosa* Urb. – southeastern Cuba
- Myrciaria rupestris* (Ekman & Urb.) Z.Acosta – western Cuba
- Pimenta adenoclada* (Urb.) Alain
- Pimenta cainitoides (Urb.) Burret – eastern Cuba and Dominican Republic
- Pimenta dioica (L.) Merr.
- Pimenta ferruginea* (Griseb.) Burret – northwestern Cuba
- Pimenta filipes* (Urb.) Burret – east-central and northeastern Cuba
- Pimenta intermedia* (Bisse) Urquiola
- Pimenta odiolens* (Urb.) Burret – eastern Cuba
- Pimenta oligantha* (Urb.) Burret – eastern Cuba
- Pimenta podocarpoides* (Areces) Landrum – eastern Cuba
- Pimenta racemosa (Mill.) J.W.Moore
- Plinia arenicola* Urquiola & Z.Acosta – western Cuba
- Plinia asa-grayi* (Krug & Urb.) Urb. – central and eastern Cuba
- Plinia baracoensis* Borhidi – southeastern Cuba
- Plinia bissei* Z.Acosta & Urquiola
- Plinia cubensis* (Griseb.) Urb. – western Cuba
- Plinia dermatodes* Urb. – western Cuba
- Plinia moaensis* Borhidi – eastern Cuba (Sierra de Moa)
- Plinia orthoclada* Urb. – western Cuba
- Plinia punctata* Urb. – eastern Cuba
- Plinia ramosissima* (Urb.) Urb. – eastern Cuba
- Plinia recurvata* Urb. – western Cuba (Sierra del Rosario)
- Plinia stenophylla* Urb. – eastern Cuba (Sierra de Nipe)
- Psidium minutifolium* Krug & Urb. – eastern Cuba
- Psidium nummularia* (C.Wright ex Griseb.) C.Wright – western Cuba
- Psidium oligospermum Mart. ex DC.
- Psidium parvifolium* Griseb.
- Psidium rotundatum* Griseb. – western and west-central Cuba
- Psidium salutare (Kunth) O.Berg
- Psidium urquiolanum* Landrum & Z.Acosta – eastern Cuba

== Nelumbonaceae ==
- Nelumbo lutea (Willd.) Pers.

== Nyctaginaceae ==
- Allionia incarnata L.
- Boerhavia coccinea Mill.
- Boerhavia diffusa L.
- Boerhavia erecta L.
- Caribea* Alain
  - Caribea litoralis* Alain – eastern Cuba
- Commicarpus scandens* (L.) Standl.
- Guapira cajalbanensis* M.A.Díaz
- Guapira clarensis* Borhidi
- Guapira discolor (Spreng.) Little
- Guapira fragrans (Dum.Cours.) Little
- Guapira insularis* (Standl.) Lundell – western Cuba
- Guapira leonis* (Standl.) Lundell – western Cuba (Sierra de Esperón)
- Guapira obtusata (Jacq.) Little
- Guapira ophiticola* Borhidi
- Guapira peninsularis* M.A.Díaz
- Guapira rufescens* (Griseb.) Lundell
  - Guapira rufescens var. lanceolatus* Borhidi
  - Guapira rufescens var. moaensis* Borhidi – eastern Cuba
- Neea cubana* M.A.Díaz
- Neea ekmanii* Heimerl
- Neea shaferi* Standl.
- Neea subcoccinea Heimerl
- Pisonia aculeata L.
- Pisonia byrsonimifolia* Heimerl & Ekman
- Pisonia ekmanii* Heimerl
- Pisonia macranthocarpa (Donn.Sm.) Donn.Sm.
- Pisonia petiolaris* Heimerl & Ekman
- Pisonia rotundata Griseb.
  - Pisonia rotundata subsp. acutiuscula* (Heimerl) M.A.Díaz & Esquivel
- Salpianthus purpurascens (Cav. ex Lag.) Hook. & Arn.

== Nymphaeaceae ==
- Nuphar advena (Aiton) W.T.Aiton
- Nymphaea amazonum Mart. & Zucc.
- Nymphaea ampla (Salisb.) DC.
- Nymphaea conardii Wiersema
- Nymphaea gardneriana Planch.
- Nymphaea glandulifera Rodschied
- Nymphaea odorata Aiton
- Nymphaea oxypetala Planch.
- Nymphaea pulchella DC.
- Nymphaea rudgeana G.Mey.

== Ochnaceae ==
- Ouratea × acunae* Borhidi (O. elliptica × O. ilicifolia)
- Ouratea agrophylla* (Tiegh.) Urb.
- Ouratea elliptica* (A.Rich.) M.Gómez
- Ouratea neuridesii* I.Castañeda
- Ouratea nitida (Sw.) Engl.
- Ouratea revoluta* (C.Wright ex Griseb.) Engl.
- Ouratea savannarum* Britton & P.Wilson
- Ouratea schizostyla* Berazaín
- Ouratea striata (Tiegh.) Urb.
- Ouratea xolismifolia* Britton & P.Wilson
- Sauvagesia erecta L.
- Sauvagesia tenella Lam.

== Olacaceae ==
- Ximenia americana L.
- Ximenia roigii* León

== Oleaceae ==
- Chionanthus acunae* (Borhidi & O.Muñiz) Borhidi
- Chionanthus axilliflorus (Griseb.) Stearn
  - Chionanthus axilliflorus subsp. moncadae* (Borhidi & O.Muñiz) P.A.González
- Chionanthus bakeri* (Urb.) Stearn
- Chionanthus bumelioides (Griseb.) Stearn
  - Chionanthus bumelioides subsp. cubensis* (P.Wilson) P.A.González
- Chionanthus domingensis Lam.
- Forestiera rhamnifolia Griseb.
- Forestiera segregata (Jacq.) Krug & Urb.
- Fraxinus caroliniana Mill.
- Haenianthus salicifolius Griseb.
- Haenianthus variifolius* Urb.

== Onagraceae ==
- Ludwigia adscendens (L.) H.Hara
- Ludwigia decurrens Walter
- Ludwigia erecta (L.) H.Hara
- Ludwigia grandiflora (Michx.) Greuter & Burdet
- Ludwigia hyssopifolia (G.Don) Exell
- Ludwigia inclinata (L.f.) M.Gómez
- Ludwigia leptocarpa (Nutt.) H.Hara
  - Ludwigia leptocarpa subsp. foliosa* (C.Wright ex Griseb.) Borhidi – western Cuba (incl. I. de la Juventud)
- Ludwigia microcarpa Michx.
- Ludwigia octovalvis (Jacq.) P.H.Raven
- Ludwigia palustris (L.) Elliott
- Ludwigia peduncularis* (C.Wright ex Griseb.) M.Gómez
- Ludwigia peploides (Kunth) P.H.Raven
- Ludwigia peruviana (L.) H.Hara
- Ludwigia polycarpa Short & R.Peter
- Ludwigia repens J.R.Forst.
- Ludwigia sedioides (Bonpl.) H.Hara
- Ludwigia simpsonii Chapm.
- Ludwigia stricta* (C.Wright ex Griseb.) C.Wright – western Cuba
- Ludwigia torulosa (Arn.) H.Hara
- Oenothera rosea L'Hér. ex Aiton

== Ophioglossaceae ==
- Botrychium jenmanii Underw.
- Botrychium virginianum (L.) Sw.
- Ophioglossum ellipticum Hook. & Grev.
- Ophioglossum palmatum L.
- Ophioglossum reticulatum L.

== Orchidaceae ==
- Acianthera bissei* (Luer) Luer
- Acianthera caymanensis (C.D.Adams) Karremans – western Cuba and Cayman Islands
- Acianthera denticulata (Cogn.) Karremans
- Acianthera murex* (Rchb.f.) Luer – eastern Cuba
- Acianthera odontotepala (Rchb.f.) Luer
- Acianthera oricola* (H.Stenzel) Karremans – western Cuba (Cabo Corrientes)
- Acianthera prostrata* (Lindl.) A.Doucette
- Acianthera rubroviridis (Lindl.) Pridgeon & M.W.Chase
- Acianthera stenzelii* Luer
- Acianthera testifolia (Sw.) Solano
- Acianthera trichophora* (Lindl.) A.Doucette
- Acianthera wilsonii (Lindl.) Pridgeon & M.W.Chase
- Anathallis obovata (Lindl.) Pridgeon & M.W.Chase
- Anathallis sertularioides (Sw.) Pridgeon & M.W.Chase
- Andreettaea aristata (Hook.) A.Doucette
- Andreettaea helenae (Fawc. & Rendle) A.Doucette
- Andreettaea llamachoi* (Luer) A.Doucette – Holguín
- Andreettaea mucronata* (Lindl. ex Cogn.) A.Doucette – eastern Cuba
- Andreettaea obliquipetala* (Acuña & C.Schweinf.) A.Doucette – eastern Cuba
- Barbosella prorepens (Rchb.f.) Schltr.
- Bletia antillana* M.A.Diaz & Sosa – eastern Cuba
- Bletia carabiaiana* L.O.Williams
- Bletia corallicola (Small) Sosa & M.W.Chase
- Bletia × ekmanii* Serguera & Sánchez (B. patula × B. purpurea)
- Bletia florida (Salisb.) R.Br.
- Bletia hoffmannii* (M.A.Díaz & Llamacho) Sosa & M.W.Chase
- Bletia patula* Hook.
- Bletia purpurea (Lam.) A.DC.
- Bletia sarcophylla* Rchb.f.
- Bletia volubilis* M.A.Díaz
- Bletia wrightii* Acuña
- Brachionidium syme-morrisii Luer
- Brassia caudata (L.) Lindl.
- Brassia maculata R.Br.
- Broughtonia cubensis* (Lindl.) Cogn. – western Cuba
- Broughtonia domingensis (Lindl.) Rolfe
- Broughtonia × guanahacabibensis* Múj.Benítez, E.González & J.M.Díaz (B. cubensis × B. ortgiesiana)
- Broughtonia lindenii (Lindl.) Dressler
- Broughtonia ortgiesiana* (Rchb.f.) Dressler
- Bulbophyllum aristatum (Rchb.f.) Hemsl.
- Bulbophyllum pinelianum (A.Rich.) Ormerod
- Calanthe calanthoides (A.Rich. & Galeotti) Hamer & Garay
- Calopogon tuberosus (L.) Britton
- Campylocentrum jamaicense (Rchb.f. & Wullschl.) Benth. ex Fawc.
- Campylocentrum micranthum (Lindl.) Rolfe
- Campylocentrum pachyrrhizum (Rchb.f.) Rolfe
- Campylocentrum poeppigii (Rchb.f.) Rolfe
- Catasetum integerrimum Hook.
- Cochleanthes flabelliformis (Sw.) R.E.Schult. & Garay
- Coelia triptera (Sm.) Mutel
- Comparettia falcata Poepp. & Endl.
- Corymborkis forcipigera (Rchb.f. & Warsz.) L.O.Williams
- Corymborkis flava (Sw.) Kuntze
- Cranichis diphylla Sw.
- Cranichis muscosa Sw.
- Cranichis ricartii Ackerman
- Cranichis tenuiflora* Griseb. – eastern Cuba
- Cranichis tenuis Rchb.f. – eastern Cuba, Dominican Republic, and Puerto Rico
- Cyclopogon cranichoides (Griseb.) Schltr.
- Cyclopogon elatus (Sw.) Schltr.
- Cyclopogon laxiflorus Ekman & Mansf.
- Cyclopogon miradorensis Schltr.
- Cyrtopodium punctatum (L.) Lindl.
- Dendrophylax alcoa Dod – eastern Cuba and Dominican Republic
- Dendrophylax barrettiae Fawc. & Rendle
- Dendrophylax filiformis (Sw.) Benth. ex Fawc.
- Dendrophylax gracilis* (Cogn.) Garay
- Dendrophylax lindenii (Lindl.) Benth. ex Rolfe
- Dendrophylax porrectus (Rchb.f.) Carlsward & Whitten
- Dendrophylax varius (Aubl.) Urb. – eastern Cuba and Haiti
- Dichaea glauca (Sw.) Lindl.
- Dichaea graminoides (Sw.) Lindl.
- Dichaea hystricina Rchb.f.
- Dichaea latifolia Lindl.
- Dichaea pendula (Aubl.) Cogn.
- Dichaea trichocarpa (Sw.) Lindl.
- Dilomilis bissei* H.Dietr.
- Dilomilis elata (Benth.) Summerh. – eastern Cuba and Jamaica
- Dilomilis montana (Sw.) Summerh.
- Dilomilis oligophylla* (Schltr.) Summerh. – eastern Cuba
- Dinema polybulbon (Sw.) Lindl.
- Domingoa haematochila (Rchb.f.) Carabia
- Elleanthus cephalotus Garay & H.R.Sweet
- Elleanthus cordidactylus Ackerman
- Eltroplectris calcarata (Sw.) Garay & H.R.Sweet
- Encyclia acutifolia Schltr. – eastern Cuba and Haiti
- Encyclia altissima Schltr.
- Encyclia bipapularis* (Rchb.f.) Acuña
- Encyclia bocourtii* Múj.Benítez & Pupulin – western Cuba
- Encyclia cajalbanensis* Múj.Benítez, Bocourt & Pupulin – western Cuba
- Encyclia × camagueyensis* Rodr.Seijo, Gonz.Estév., Sauleda, Risco Vill. & Esperon (E. altissima × E. phoenicea)
- Encyclia × darieniana* Esperon & Sauleda (E. moebusii × E. phoenicea)
- Encyclia fucata (Lindl.) Schltr.
- Encyclia grahamii* (Hook.) Bosmenier, Esperon & Sauleda
- Encyclia gravida (Lindl.) Schltr.
- Encyclia grisebachiana* (Cogn.) Acuña – western Cuba
- Encyclia guanahacabibensis* Sauleda & Esperon – western Cuba
- Encyclia hamiltonii* Sauleda & Esperon
- Encyclia havanensis* O.Bello, Esperon & Sauleda
- Encyclia holguinensis* Soto Calvo, Esperon & Sauleda
- Encyclia howardii* (Ames & Correll) Hoehne – eastern Cuba
- Encyclia isochila (Rchb.f.) Dod
- Encyclia moebusii* H.Dietr. – central and eastern Cuba
- Encyclia monteverdensis* M.A.Díaz & Ackerman – eastern Cuba (Guantánamo)
- Encyclia navarroi* Vale & D.Rojas
- Encyclia nematocaulon* (A.Rich.) Acuña
- Encyclia ochrantha* (A.Rich.) Withner
- Encyclia × osmentii* Sauleda & Esperon (E. hamiltonii × E. moebusii)
- Encyclia oxypetala* (Lindl.) Schltr.
- Encyclia phoenicea* (Lindl.) Neumann
- Encyclia plicata (Lindl.) Schltr. – Cuba and Bahamas
- Encyclia pyriformis* (Lindl.) Schltr. – western Cuba incl. I. de la Juventud
- Encyclia richardiana* Rodr.Seijo, Esperon & Sauleda
- Encyclia rosariensis* Múj.Benítez, R.Pérez & Pupulin – western Cuba
- Encyclia rufa (Lindl.) Britton & Millsp.
- Encyclia sabanensis* Vale, Pérez-Obr. & Faife
- Encyclia sagrana* (A.Rich.) Soto Calvo, Esperon & Sauleda
- Encyclia triangulifera* (Rchb.f.) Acuña
- Epidendrum acunae Dressler
- Epidendrum amphistomum A.Rich.
- Epidendrum angustilobum Fawc. & Rendle
- Epidendrum brachyrepens Hágsater
- Epidendrum diffusum Sw.
- Epidendrum floridense Hágsater
- Epidendrum jamaicense Lindl.
- Epidendrum miserrimum Rchb.f.
- Epidendrum neoporpax Ames
- Epidendrum nocturnum Jacq.
- Epidendrum orientale Hágsater & M.A.Díaz
- Epidendrum polygonatum Lindl.
- Epidendrum portoricense Hágsater & Ackerman
- Epidendrum ramosum Jacq.
- Epidendrum repens Cogn.
- Epidendrum rigidum Jacq.
- Epidendrum rivulare Lindl.
- Epidendrum scalpelligerum Rchb.f.
- Epidendrum serrulatum Sw.
- Epidendrum strobiliferum Rchb.f.
- Epidendrum umbelliferum J.F.Gmel.
- Epidendrum verrucosum Sw.
- Epidendrum vincentinum Lindl.
- Epidendrum wrightii Lindl.
- Eulophia alta (L.) Fawc. & Rendle
- Eulophia ecristata (Fernald) Ames
- Eurystyles actinosophila (Barb.Rodr.) Schltr.
- Eurystyles domingensis Dod – eastern Cuba and Hispaniola
- Fuertesiella pterichoides Schltr.
- Galeandra bicarinata G.A.Romero & P.M.Br.
- Govenia utriculata (Sw.) Lindl.
- Greenwoodiella wercklei (Schltr.) Salazar & R.Jiménez
- Habenaria alata Hook.
- Habenaria bicornis Lindl.
- Habenaria brittonae* Ames
- Habenaria distans Griseb.
- Habenaria eustachya Rchb.f.
- Habenaria floribunda Lindl.
- Habenaria macroceratitis Willd.
- Habenaria maculosa Lindl.
- Habenaria monorrhiza (Sw.) Rchb.f.
- Habenaria quinqueseta (Michx.) Eaton
- Habenaria repens Nutt.
- Hapalorchis lineata (Lindl.) Schltr.
- Homalopetalum leochilus (Rchb.f.) Soto Arenas
- Homalopetalum vomeriforme (Sw.) Fawc. & Rendle
- Ida pegueroi (Archila) J.M.H.Shaw
- Ionopsis satyrioides (Sw.) Rchb.f.
- Ionopsis utricularioides (Sw.) Lindl.
- Isochilus linearis (Jacq.) R.Br.
- Jacquiniella globosa (Jacq.) Schltr.
- Karma dura (Lindl.) Karremans
- Laelia lyonsii (Lindl.) L.O.Williams
- Lankesterella alainii Nir
- Leochilus labiatus (Sw.) Kuntze
- Leochilus scriptus (Scheidw.) Rchb.f.
- Lepanthes acunae* Hespenh.
- Lepanthes aubryi* Luer & H.P.Jesup
- Lepanthes blepharantha* Schltr.
- Lepanthes blepharophylla* (Griseb.) Hespenh.
- Lepanthes caluffii* E.González & Luer – southeastern Cuba
- Lepanthes chrysostigma* Lindl.
- Lepanthes comadresina* Luer
- Lepanthes cubensis* Hespenh.
- Lepanthes cyrillicola* Luer & Llamacho
- Lepanthes decoris* Luer & Llamacho
- Lepanthes diaziae* Luer
- Lepanthes dorsalis* Lindl.
- Lepanthes dressleri* Hespenh.
- Lepanthes ekmanii* Schltr.
- Lepanthes fractiflexa* Ames & C.Schweinf.
- Lepanthes fulva* Lindl.
- Lepanthes grisebachiana* Hespenh.
- Lepanthes llamachoi* Luer
- Lepanthes macrolabia* E.Restrepo & Soto Calvo
- Lepanthes melanocaulon* Schltr. – eastern Cuba
- Lepanthes nana* Luer & H.P.Jesup
- Lepanthes obliquiloba* Hespenh.
- Lepanthes palpebralis* Luer
- Lepanthes pergracilis* Schltr.
- Lepanthes pristidis Rchb.f.
- Lepanthes silvae* H.Dietr. – Sierra de Moa
- Lepanthes trichodactyla* Lindl.
- Lepanthes turquinoensis* Schltr
- Lepanthes woodfredensis* Luer
- Lepanthes wrightii* Rchb.f.
- Lepanthopsis anthoctenium (Rchb.f.) Ames
- Lepanthopsis hyalina* (H.Stenzel) Karremans Sierra de Moa
- Lepanthopsis melanantha (Rchb.f.) Ames
- Lepanthopsis microlepanthes (Griseb.) Ames
- Lepanthopsis pygmaea* C.Schweinf. – southeastern Cuba and Haiti
- Liparis jamaicensis Lindl. ex Griseb.
- Liparis lindeniana (A.Rich. & Galeotti) Hemsl.
- Liparis nervosa (Thunb.) Lindl.
- Liparis saundersiana Rchb.f.
- Liparis viridipurpurea Griseb.
- Macradenia lutescens R.Br.
- Malaxis apiculata Dod – eastern Cuba and Hispaniola
- Malaxis domingensis Ames
- Malaxis hispaniolae (Schltr.) L.O.Williams – eastern Cuba and Hispaniola
- Malaxis juventudensis* Marg. – I. de la Juventud
- Malaxis labrosa* (Rchb.f.) Acuña
- Malaxis pusilla* Ames & C.Schweinf. – southeastern Cuba
- Malaxis spicata Sw.
- Malaxis umbelliflora Sw.
- Malaxis unifolia Michx.
- Maxillaria adendrobium (Rchb.f.) Dressler
- Maxillaria alba (Hook.) Lindl.
- Maxillaria crassifolia (Lindl.) Rchb.f.
- Maxillaria grisebachiana Nir & Dod
- Maxillaria parviflora (Poepp. & Endl.) Garay
- Maxillaria pudica Carnevali & J.L.Tapia
- Maxillaria valenzuelana (A.Rich.) Nash
- Mesadenus lucayanus (Britton) Schltr.
- Microchilus corniculatus (Rchb.f.) E.C.Smidt & M.W.Chase
- Microchilus familiaris Ormerod
- Microchilus hirtellus (Sw.) D.Dietr.
- Microchilus plantagineus (L.) D.Dietr.
- Microchilus querceticola (Lindl.) D.Dietr.
- Nidema ottonis (Rchb.f.) Britton & Millsp.
- Octomeria prostrata* H.Stenzel
- Octomeria ventii* H.Dietr. – eastern Cuba
- Oncidium altissimum (Jacq.) Sw.
- Oncidium ensatum Lindl.
- Pelexia adnata (Sw.) Poit. ex Rich.
- Pelexia maxonii* Ames – eastern Cuba
- Pelexia obliqua (J.J.Sm.) Garay
- Phloeophila nummularia (Rchb.f.) Garay
- Platanthera replicata* (A.Rich.) Ackerman
- Platystele ovalifolia (H.Focke) Garay & Dunst.
- Pleurothallis ekmanii* Schltr. in I.Urban – eastern Cuba
- Pleurothallis ekmanii* Schltr. – eastern Cuba
- Pleurothallis excentrica* (Luer) Luer – eastern Cuba
- Pleurothallis pruinosa Lindl.
- Pleurothallis quadrifida (Lex.) Lindl.
- Pleurothallis ruscifolia (Jacq.) R.Br.
- Polystachya concreta (Jacq.) Garay & H.R.Sweet
- Polystachya foliosa (Hook.) Rchb.f.
- Ponthieva brittoniae Ames
- Ponthieva diptera Linden & Rchb.f.
- Ponthieva glandulosa (Sims) R.Br.
- Ponthieva pauciflora (Sw.) Fawc. & Rendle
- Ponthieva petiolata Lindl.
- Ponthieva pubescens (C.Presl) C.Schweinf.
- Ponthieva racemosa (Walter) C.Mohr
- Ponthieva ventricosa (Griseb.) Fawc. & Rendle
- Prescottia cordifolia Rchb.f.
- Prescottia oligantha (Sw.) Lindl.
- Prescottia stachyodes (Sw.) Lindl.
- Prosthechea boothiana (Lindl.) W.E.Higgins
- Prosthechea cochleata (L.) W.E.Higgins
- Prosthechea fragrans (Sw.) W.E.Higgins
- Prosthechea fuertesii (Cogn.) Christenson
- Prosthechea pygmaea (Hook.) W.E.Higgins
- Prosthechea roraimensis V.P.Castro & Campacci
- Prosthechea spondiada (Rchb.f.) W.E.Higgins
- Pseudogoodyera wrightii (Rchb.f.) Schltr.
- Psilochilus macrophyllus (Lindl.) Ames
- Sacoila lanceolata (Aubl.) Garay
- Sacoila squamulosa (Kunth) Garay
- Scaphyglottis emarginata (Garay) Dressler
- Scaphyglottis modesta (Rchb.f.) Schltr.
- Specklinia brighamii (S.Watson) Pridgeon & M.W.Chase
- Specklinia corniculata (Sw.) Mutel
- Specklinia grisebachiana (Cogn.) Luer
- Specklinia lichenicola* (Griseb.) Pridgeon & M.W.Chase
- Specklinia picta (Lindl.) Pridgeon & M.W.Chase
- Specklinia schaferi (Ames) Luer – eastern Cuba and Hispaniola
- Specklinia tribuloides (Sw.) Pridgeon & M.W.Chase
- Specklinia trichyphis (Rchb.f.) Luer – western Cuba
- Specklinia wrightii (Rchb.f.) Luer – eastern Cuba
- Spiranthes torta (Thunb.) Garay & H.R.Sweet
- Stelis antillensis Pridgeon & M.W.Chase
- Stelis cubensis* Schltr.
- Stelis ekmanii* Schltr.
- Stelis gelida (Lindl.) Pridgeon & M.W.Chase
- Stelis minima* Luer & Toscano
- Stelis multirostris (Rchb.f.) Pridgeon & M.W.Chase
- Stelis ophioglossoides (Jacq.) Sw. – eastern Cuba, Lesser Antilles, and northern South America
- Stelis pygmaea Cogn.
- Stenorrhynchos speciosum (Jacq.) Rich.
- Tetramicra ekmanii Mansf.
- Tetramicra malpighiarum* J.A.Hern. & M.A.Díaz
- Tetramicra parviflora Lindl. ex Griseb.
- Tetramicra riparia* Vale, Sánchez-Abad & L.Navarro
- Tetramicra simplex* Ames
- Tetramicra tenera* (A.Rich.) Griseb. ex Benth.
- Tetramicra × xislensii* Soto Calvo, Esperon & Sauleda (T. eulophiae × T. simplex)
- Tolumnia acunae* (M.A.Díaz) Nir
- Tolumnia calochila (Cogn.) Braem
- Tolumnia guibertiana* (A.Rich.) Braem
- Tolumnia gundlachii (C.Wright ex Griseb.) N.H.Williams & Ackerman
- Tolumnia hawkesiana* (Moir) Braem – northern Cuba
- Tolumnia lemoniana (Lindl.) Braem
- Tolumnia lucayana (Nash) Braem – Bahamas and northern Cuba
- Tolumnia sylvestris* (Lindl.) Braem
- Tolumnia tuerckheimii (Cogn.) Braem
- Tolumnia usneoides* (Lindl.) Braem
- Tolumnia variegata (Sw.) Braem
- Trichocentrum carthagenense (Jacq.) M.W.Chase & N.H.Williams
- Trichocentrum undulatum (Sw.) Ackerman & M.W.Chase
- Trichopilia fragrans (Lindl.) Rchb.f.
- Trichopilia subulata (Sw.) Rchb.f.
- Trichosalpinx memor (Rchb.f.) Luer
- Triphora gentianoides (Sw.) Nutt. ex Ames & Schltr.
- Triphora miserrima (Cogn.) Acuña
- Triphora pinensis* Soto Calvo, Esperon & Sauleda
- Triphora surinamensis (Lindl.) Britton in N.L.Britton & P.Wilson
- Tropidia polystachya (Sw.) Ames
- Vanilla barbellata Rchb.f.
- Vanilla bicolor Lindl.
- Vanilla claviculata Sw.
- Vanilla dilloniana Correll
- Vanilla marmoreisense* Soto Calvo, Esperon & Sauleda
- Vanilla mexican Mill.
- Vanilla phaeantha Rchb.f.
- Vanilla poitaei Rchb.f.
- Vanilla savannarum* Britton – central Cuba
- Wullschlaegelia aphylla (Sw.) Rchb.f.
- Xylobium palmifolium (Sw.) Fawc.
- Zootrophion atropurpureum (Lindl.) Luer

== Orobanchaceae ==
- Agalinis fasciculata (Elliott) Raf.
- Agalinis harperi Pennell
- Agalinis linifolia (Nutt.) Britton
- Agalinis maritima (Raf.) Raf.
- Agalinis purpurea (L.) Pennell
- Anisantherina hispidula (Mart.) Pennell
- Buchnera floridana Gand.
- Buchnera longifolia Kunth
- Buchnera pusilla Kunth
- Seymeriopsis* Tzvelev
  - Seymeriopsis bissei* Tzvelev

== Osmundaceae ==
- Osmunda spectabilis Willd.
- Osmundastrum cinnamomeum (L.) C.Presl

== Oxalidaceae ==
- Oxalis cajalbanensis* Urb.
- Oxalis pinetorum* (Small) Urb.
- Oxalis rugeliana Urb.
- Oxalis thelyoxys Focke

== Papaveraceae ==
- Bocconia frutescens L.

== Passifloraceae ==
- Adenoa* Arbo
  - Adenoa cubensis* (Britton & P.Wilson) Arbo
- Passiflora berteroana Balb. ex DC.
- Passiflora capsularis L.
- Passiflora ciliata Aiton
  - Passiflora ciliata var. santiagana (Killip) Vanderpl. – eastern Cuba
- Passiflora cubensis* Urb.
- Passiflora cupraea L.
- Passiflora dasyadenia* Urb.
- Passiflora foetida L.
- Passiflora holosericea L.
- Passiflora insueta Feuillet & MacDougal
- Passiflora laurifolia L.
- Passiflora maestrensis* Duharte – southeastern Cuba
- Passiflora maliformis L.
- Passiflora mariaelvirae* Cruz Aroz. & García-Beltrán
- Passiflora multiflora L.
- Passiflora nipensis* Britton – eastern Cuba
- Passiflora pallens Poepp. ex Mast.
- Passiflora pallida L.
- Passiflora pedata L.
- Passiflora penduliflora Bertero ex DC.
- Passiflora quinqueloba* (Griseb.) Cruz Aroz. & García-Beltrán
- Passiflora rubra L.
- Passiflora sexflora Juss.
- Passiflora shaferi* Britton
- Passiflora stenoloba* Urb.
- Passiflora suberosa L.
- Passiflora vesicaria L.
- Passiflora wrightiana H.T.Svoboda
- Piriqueta cistoides (L.) Griseb.
- Piriqueta racemosa (Jacq.) Sweet
- Piriqueta viscosa Griseb.
- Turnera acaulis* Griseb.
- Turnera diffusa Willd. ex Schult.
- Turnera diminuta* Cabeza ex Greuter & R.Rankin
- Turnera pumilea L.
- Turnera ulmifolia L.

== Pentaphylacaceae ==
- Cleyera albopunctata* (Planch. ex Griseb.) Krug & Urb. – eastern Cuba, Hispaniola, and Puerto Rico
- Cleyera ekmanii* (O.C.Schmidt) Kobuski – eastern Cuba (Sierra Maestra)
- Cleyera nimanimae* (Tul.) Krug & Urb. – southeastern Cuba
- Freziera conocarpa* (O.C.Schmidt) Kobuski
- Freziera grisebachii Krug & Urb.
- Ternstroemia baracoensis* O.C.Schmidt
- Ternstroemia cernua* Griseb.
- Ternstroemia ekmanii* O.C.Schmidt
- Ternstroemia flavescens* Griseb.
- Ternstroemia microcalyx Krug & Urb.
- Ternstroemia moaensis* Borhidi & O.Muñiz – eastern Cuba
- Ternstroemia parviflora Krug & Urb.
- Ternstroemia peduncularis* DC.

== Peraceae ==
- Chaetocarpus acutifolius* (Britton & P.Wilson) Borhidi – Sierra de Moa
- Chaetocarpus cordifolius (Urb.) Borhidi – eastern Cuba, Hispaniola, and Jamaica
- Chaetocarpus cubensis* Fawc. & Rendle – western Cuba
- Chaetocarpus globosus (Sw.) Fawc. & Rendle
  - Chaetocarpus globosus subsp. oblongatus (Alain) Borhidi – Sierra de Moa
- Chaetocarpus parvifolius* Borhidi – eastern Cuba
- Pera bumeliifolia Griseb.
- Pera ekmanii* Urb. – northeastern Cuba
- Pera longipes* Britton & P.Wilson – Sierra de Moa
- Pera microcarpa* Urb. – Sierra Maestra
- Pera oppositifolia Griseb. Costa Rica and western Cuba incl. I. de la Juventud
- Pera orientensis* Borhidi – eastern Cuba
- Pera ovalifolia* Urb.
- Pera pallidifolia* Britton & P.Wilson – northeastern Cuba
- Pera polylepis Urb.

== Petiveriaceae ==
- Petiveria alliacea L.
- Rivina humilis L.
- Trichostigma octandrum (L.) H.Walter

== Phyllanthaceae ==
- Andrachne brittonii Urb. – eastern Cuba and Haiti
- Astrocasia tremula (Griseb.) G.L.Webster
- Chascotheca neopeltandra (Griseb.) Urb.
- Chascotheca triplinervia* (Müll.Arg.) G.L.Webster
- Flueggea acidoton (L.) G.L.Webster
- Heterosavia bahamensis (Britton) Petra Hoffm.
- Heterosavia erythroxyloides (Griseb.) Petra Hoffm.
- Heterosavia laurifolia* (Griseb.) Petra Hoffm.
- Heterosavia maculata (Urb.) Petra Hoffm.
- Hieronyma clusioides (Tul.) Griseb. – eastern Cuba and Puerto Rico
- Hieronyma crassistipula* Urb. – I. de la Juventud
- Hieronyma cubana* Müll.Arg. – western and central Cuba
- Hieronyma havanensis* Urb. – western and central Cuba
- Hieronyma nipensis* Urb. – eastern Cuba
- Hieronyma ovata* Urb. – eastern Cuba
- Hieronyma paucinervis* Urb. – eastern Cuba
- Margaritaria nobilis L.f.
- Margaritaria scandens (C.Wright ex Griseb.) G.L.Webster – Bahamas and eastern Cuba including I. de la Juventud
- Margaritaria tetracocca (Baill.) G.L.Webster – eastern Cuba and Haiti
- Phyllanthus acuminatus Vahl
- Phyllanthus amarus Schumach. & Thonn.
- Phyllanthus angustifolius (Sw.) Sw.
- Phyllanthus carnosulus* Müll.Arg. - southeastern Cuba
- Phyllanthus caroliniensis Walter
- Phyllanthus chamaecristoides* Urb.
- Phyllanthus chryseus* R.A.Howard – eastern Cuba (Sierra de Moa)
- Phyllanthus cinctus* Urb. – eastern Cuba
- Phyllanthus comosus* Urb. – northeastern Cuba
- Phyllanthus comptus* G.L.Webster – Cajalbana Region
- Phyllanthus cristalensis* Urb. – eastern Cuba (Sierra del Cristal)
- Phyllanthus dimorphus* Britton & P.Wilson – Sierra de Trinidad
- Phyllanthus discolor* Poepp. ex Spreng. – central and western Cuba
- Phyllanthus echinospermus* C.Wright – western Cuba
- Phyllanthus ekmanii* G.L.Webster – Sierra de Nipe
- Phyllanthus epiphyllanthus L.
  - Phyllanthus epiphyllanthus subsp. dilatatus* (Müll.Arg.) G.L.Webster – eastern Cuba
- Phyllanthus excisus* Urb. – Sierra Sagua Baracoa
- Phyllanthus formosus* Urb. – eastern Cuba
- Phyllanthus heliotropus* C.Wright ex Griseb. – western Cuba incl. I. de la Juventud
- Phyllanthus imbricatus* G.L.Webster – southwestern I. de la Juventud
- Phyllanthus incrustatus* Urb. – northeastern Cuba
- Phyllanthus juglandifolius Willd.
- Phyllanthus junceus* Müll.Arg. – western Cuba incl. I. de la Juventud
- Phyllanthus lindenianus Baill.
- Phyllanthus maestrensis* Urb. – eastern Cuba (Sierra Maestra)
- Phyllanthus micranthus* A.Rich. – southeastern Cuba
- Phyllanthus microdictyus* Urb. – northeastern Cuba
- Phyllanthus mirificus* G.L.Webster – northeastern Cuba
- Phyllanthus myrtilloides* Griseb. – eastern Cuba
- Phyllanthus nutans Sw.
- Phyllanthus orbicularis Kunth
- Phyllanthus pachystylus Urb. – eastern Cuba and northwestern Haiti
- Phyllanthus × pallidus* C.Wright ex Griseb. (P. discolor × P. ?) – western Cuba
- Phyllanthus pentaphyllus C.Wright ex Griseb.
- Phyllanthus phialanthoides* Falcón & J.L.Gómez
- Phyllanthus phlebocarpus* Urb.
- Phyllanthus procerus* C.Wright – Cuba incl. I. de la Juventud
- Phyllanthus pseudocicca* Griseb. – eastern Cuba
- Phyllanthus pulverulentus* Urb. – southeastern Cuba
- Phyllanthus scopulorum* (Britton) Urb. – northeastern Cuba
- Phyllanthus selbyi* Britton & P.Wilson – Cuba incl. I. de la Juventud
- Phyllanthus stipulatus (Raf.) G.L.Webster
- Phyllanthus subcarnosus C.Wright ex Griseb. – Cuba and Haiti
- Phyllanthus tenuicaulis Müll.Arg. – eastern Cuba and Haiti
  - Phyllanthus tenuicaulis var. tenuicaulis – eastern Cuba
- Phyllanthus williamioides Griseb. – eastern Cuba (Sierra Sagua Baracoa)
- Savia sessiliflora (Sw.) Willd.

== Phytolaccaceae ==
- Phytolacca icosandra L.
- Phytolacca rivinoides Kunth & C.D.Bouché

== Picramniaceae ==
- Alvaradoa amorphoides Liebm.
  - Alvaradoa amorphoides subsp. caribaea* A.Noa
- Alvaradoa arborescens* Griseb.
- Picramnia antidesma Sw.
- Picramnia pentandra Sw.
- Picramnia reticulata* Griseb. – western Cuba

== Picrodendraceae ==
- Picrodendron baccatum (L.) Krug & Urb. – Jamaica walnut

== Pinaceae ==
- Pinus caribaea Morelet – Caribbean Pine
  - Pinus caribaea var. caribaea – western Cuba incl. I. de la Juventud
- Pinus cubensis* Griseb. – Cuban Pine; eastern Cuba
- Pinus tropicalis* Morelet – Tropical Pine; western Cuba incl. I. de la Juventud

== Piperaceae ==
- Peperomia acaulis* Alain
- Peperomia acuminata Ruiz & Pav.
- Peperomia alata Ruiz & Pav.
- Peperomia angustata Kunth
- Peperomia brachyphylla (Willd. ex Roem. & Schult.) Sweet – eastern Cuba and Hispaniola
- Peperomia cogniauxii Urb. – eastern Cuba, Hispaniola, and Puerto Rico
- Peperomia crassicaulis Fawc. & Rendle – Cuba, Hispaniola, and Jamaica
- Peperomia cubensis C.DC. – Cuba, Hispaniola, and Jamaica
- Peperomia cuspidata* Dahlst.
- Peperomia distachyos (L.) A.Dietr.
- Peperomia emarginella (Sw. ex Wikstr.) C.DC.
- Peperomia erythropremna* Trel.
- Peperomia galioides Kunth
- Peperomia glabella (Sw.) A.Dietr.
- Peperomia grisebachii* C.DC.
- Peperomia guadaloupensis C.DC. – Cuba and Jamaica
- Peperomia guanensis* Trel.
- Peperomia hernandiifolia (Vahl) A.Dietr.
- Peperomia hirta C.DC.
- Peperomia lineatipila* A.Rich.
- Peperomia maculosa (L.) Hook.
- Peperomia maestrana* Trel. – eastern Cuba
- Peperomia magnoliifolia (Jacq.) A.Dietr.
- Peperomia maxonii C.DC. – Cuba, Hispaniola, and Puerto Rico
- Peperomia mutilata* Trel.
- Peperomia obtusifolia (L.) A.Dietr.
- Peperomia pellucida (L.) Kunth
- Peperomia penicillata C.DC. – Cuba, Hispaniola, and Jamaica
- Peperomia petiolaris C.DC.
- Peperomia petrophila* C.DC.
- Peperomia pseudopereskiifolia C.DC.
- Peperomia pseudorhynchophoros C.DC.
- Peperomia quadrangularis (J.V.Thomps.) A.Dietr.
- Peperomia quadrifolia (L.) Kunth
- Peperomia rhombea Ruiz & Pav.
- Peperomia rotundifolia (L.) Kunth
- Peperomia septemnervis Ruiz & Pav.
- Peperomia similis* Britton
- Peperomia spathophylla Dahlst. – Cuba and Hispaniola
- Peperomia subrotunda* (Haw.) A.Dietr.
- Peperomia subrotundifolia C.DC. – Cuba and Dominican Republic
- Peperomia swartziana Miq.
- Peperomia tenella (Sw.) A.Dietr.
- Peperomia tetraphylla (G.Forst.) Hook. & Arn.
- Peperomia urbani* Trel.
- Peperomia urocarpa Fisch. & C.A.Mey.
- Peperomia verticillata (L.) A.Dietr. – Cuba, Hispaniola, and Jamaica
- Piper amalago L.
- Piper articulatum A.Rich.
- Piper baracoanum* León
- Piper confusum C.DC. – Cuba and Hispaniola
- Piper geniculatum Sw.
- Piper guanahacabibense* Borhidi
- Piper hispidum Sw.
- Piper holguinianum* Trel.
- Piper lindenianum* C.DC.
- Piper lippoldii* Saralegui
- Piper mananthum* C.Wright
- Piper marginatum Jacq.
- Piper obtusum* C.DC.
- Piper peltatum L.
- Piper perditum* Trel.
- Piper sphaerocarpum* (Griseb.) C.DC. ex C.Wright
- Piper umbellatum L.
- Piper wrightii* C.DC.
- Verhuellia hydrocotylifolia* (Griseb.) C.DC. ex C.Wright – western and eastern Cuba
- Verhuellia pellucida* F.Schmitz – eastern Cuba

== Plantaginaceae ==
- Angelonia angustifolia Benth.
- Angelonia pilosella* J.Kickx f.
- Bacopa beccabunga* (Griseb.) B.L.Rob.
- Bacopa caroliniana (Walter) B.L.Rob.
- Bacopa humifusa* (Griseb.) B.L.Rob.
- Bacopa innominata (M.Gómez) Alain
- Bacopa longipes* (Pennell) Standl.
- Bacopa micromonnieria* (Griseb.) B.L.Rob.
- Bacopa minuta* Borhidi & O.Muñiz
- Bacopa monnieri (L.) Wettst.
- Bacopa repens (Sw.) Wettst.
- Bacopa sessiliflora (Benth.) Edwall
- Bacopa stemodioides* (Pennell) Pennell – I. de la Juventud
- Benjaminia reflexa (Benth.) D'Arcy
- Callitriche occidentalis* Hegelm.
- Callitriche peploides Nutt.
- Cheilophyllum dentatum* Urb. – central Cuba
- Cheilophyllum macranthum* Urb. – central Cuba
- Cheilophyllum marginatum* Pennell – central Cuba
- Cheilophyllum micranthum* Urb. – Camagüey
- Cheilophyllum microphyllum* Pennell – Pinar del Río
- Cheilophyllum radicans* (Griseb.) Pennell
- Cheilophyllum sphaerocarpum* Urb. – central Cuba
- Encopella tenuifolia* (Griseb.) Pennell – western and central Cuba
- Maurandella antirrhiniflora (Humb. & Bonpl. ex Willd.) Rothm.
- Mecardonia procumbens (Mill.) Small
- Russelia sarmentosa Jacq.
- Scoparia dulcis L.
- Stemodia durantifolia (L.) Sw.
- Stemodia fruticulosa* Tzvelev
- Stemodia jorullensis Kunth
- Stemodia maritima L.

== Plumbaginaceae ==
- Plumbago zeylanica L.

== Poaceae ==
- Acroceras zizanioides (Kunth) Dandy
- Anatherum bicorne (L.) P.Beauv.
- Anatherum glomeratum (Walter) Voronts. & E.A.Kellogg
- Anatherum gyrans (Ashe) Voronts. & E.A.Kellogg
- Anatherum laterale (Nees) Voronts. & E.A.Kellogg
- Anatherum leucostachyum (Kunth) Voronts. & E.A.Kellogg
- Anatherum macrothrix (Trin.) Voronts. & E.A.Kellogg
- Anatherum selloanum (Hack.) Voronts. & E.A.Kellogg
- Anatherum virginicum (L.) Spreng.
- Andropogon angustatus (J.Presl) Steud.
- Andropogon multinervosus* (Nash) Hitchc. & Chase
- Andropogon tener (Nees) Kunth
- Andropogon virgatus Desv.
- Anthenantia lanata (Kunth) Benth.
- Anthephora hermaphrodita (L.) Kuntze
- Aristida adscensionis L.
- Aristida bissei* Catasús – I. de la Juventud
- Aristida calcicola Hitchc. & Ekman – Cuba, Hispaniola, and Puerto Rico
- Aristida curtifolia* Hitchc.
- Aristida erecta* Hitchc.
- Aristida fragilis Hitchc. & Ekman
- Aristida gyrans Chapm. – Cuba, Hispaniola, Florida, and Georgia
- Aristida jaucense* Catasús
- Aristida laevigata* Hitchc. & Ekman
- Aristida mohrii Nash – Cuba, Hispaniola, and southeastern United States
- Aristida neglecta León ex Hitchc. – Cuba and Hispaniola
- Aristida pinifolia Catasús – I. de la Juventud
- Aristida pradana* León
- Aristida purpurascens Poir.
- Aristida purpurea Nutt.
- Aristida refracta Griseb.
- Aristida rosei Hitchc. – Cuba and Hispaniola
- Aristida sandinensis* Catasús
- Aristida spiciformis Elliott
- Aristida ternipes Cav.
- Aristida vilfifolia Henrard – Cuba, Bahamas, and Hispaniola
- Arthropogon piptostachyus (Griseb.) Pilg. – Cuba and Jamaica
- Arthrostylidium cubense* Rupr.
- Arthrostylidium distichum Pilg. – Cuba and Hispaniola
- Arthrostylidium ekmanii Hitchc. – Cuba and Hispaniola
- Arthrostylidium fimbriatum* Griseb.
- Arthrostylidium multispicatum Pilg. – Cuba, Hispaniola, Puerto Rico, and Trinidad and Tobago
- Arthrostylidium reflexum* Hitchc. & Ekman
- Arthrostylidium sarmentosum Pilg.
- Arthrostylidium urbanii* Pilg.
- Arundinella berteroniana (Schult.) Hitchc. & Chase
- Arundinella deppeana Nees
- Arundinella hispida (Kunth ex Willd.) Kuntze
- Axonopus compressus (Sw.) P.Beauv.
- Axonopus debilis* G.A.Black
- Axonopus fissifolius (Raddi) Kuhlm.
- Axonopus furcatus (Flüggé) Hitchc.
- Bothriochloa saccharoides (Sw.) Rydb.
- Bouteloua americana (L.) Scribn.
- Bouteloua dimorpha Columbus
- Bouteloua disticha (Kunth) Benth.
- Bouteloua juncea (Desv. ex P.Beauv.) Hitchc.
- Bouteloua repens (Kunth) Scribn. & Merr.
- Bouteloua vaneedenii Pilg. – Cuba, Leeward Islands, and Venezuela
- Cenchrus brownii Roem. & Schult.
- Cenchrus distichophyllus* Griseb. – western Cuba
- Cenchrus domingensis (Spreng. ex Schult.) Morrone – Cuba and Hispaniola
- Cenchrus echinatus L.
- Cenchrus gracillimus Nash
- Cenchrus myosuroides Kunth
- Cenchrus spinifex Cav.
- Cenchrus tribuloides L.
- Chaetium cubanum* (C.Wright) Hitchc. – central and eastern Cuba
- Chloris arenaria* Hitchc. & Ekman
- Chloris berazainiae* Catasús
- Chloris cruciata (L.) Sw. – Cuba, Bahamas, Hispaniola, and Jamaica
- Chloris cubensis Hitchc. & Ekman
- Chloris ekmanii Hitchc. – Cuba, Hispaniola, and Jamaica
- Chloris radiata (L.) Sw.
- Chloris sagrana A.Rich.
- Chloris virgata Sw.
- Chrysopogon pauciflorus (Chapm.) Benth. ex Vasey
- Chusquea abietifolia* Griseb.
- Coleataenia beyeri* (Hitchc. & Ekman) J.R.Grande
- Coleataenia caricoides (Nees ex Trin.) Soreng
- Coleataenia petersonii* (Hitchc. & Ekman) Soreng
- Coleataenia rigidula (Bosc ex Nees) LeBlond
- Coleataenia stenodes (Griseb.) Soreng
- Coleataenia tenera (Beyr. ex Trin.) Soreng
- Cyphonanthus discrepans (Döll) Zuloaga & Morrone
- Dichanthelium aciculare (Desv.) Gould & C.A.Clark
- Dichanthelium acuminatum (Sw.) Gould & C.A.Clark
- Dichanthelium albomarginatum (Nash) Wipff
- Dichanthelium caerulescens (Hack. ex Hitchc.) Correll
- Dichanthelium chrysopsidifolium (Nash) J.R.Thomas & Wipff
- Dichanthelium commutatum (Schult.) Gould
- Dichanthelium ensifolium (Baldwin ex Elliott) Gould
- Dichanthelium erectifolium (Nash) Gould & C.A.Clark
- Dichanthelium filiramum (Ashe) LeBlond
- Dichanthelium fusiforme (Hitchc.) Harvill
- Dichanthelium joorii (Vasey) Mohlenbr.
- Dichanthelium laxiflorum (Lam.) Gould
- Dichanthelium longiligulatum (Nash) Freckmann
- Dichanthelium neuranthum (Griseb.) LeBlond
- Dichanthelium nitidum (Lam.) Mohlenbr.
- Dichanthelium polycaulon (Nash) Wipff
- Dichanthelium portoricense (Desv.) B.F.Hansen & Wunderlin
- Dichanthelium scoparium (Lam.) Gould
- Dichanthelium sphaerocarpon (Elliott) Gould
- Dichanthelium strigosum (Muhl. ex Elliott) Freckmann
- Dichanthelium trifolium (Nash) Wipff
- Dichanthelium wilmingtonense (Ashe) Wipff
- Dichanthelium wrightianum (Scribn.) Freckmann
- Diectomis fastigiata (Sw.) P.Beauv.
- Digitaria argillacea (Hitchc. & Chase) Fernald
- Digitaria curvinervis (Hack.) Fernald
- Digitaria ekmanii* Hitchc. – western Cuba
- Digitaria filiformis (L.) Koeler
- Digitaria horizontalis Willd.
- Digitaria insularis (L.) Mez ex Ekman
- Digitaria panicea (Sw.) Urb.
- Digitaria pinetorum* Hitchc. – western Cuba
- Digitaria serotina (Walter) Michx.
- Digitaria villosa (Walter) Pers.
- Dinebra panicea (Retz.) P.M.Peterson & N.Snow
- Diplachne fusca (L.) P.Beauv. ex Roem. & Schult.
- Distichlis littoralis (Engelm.) H.L.Bell & Columbus
- Distichlis spicata (L.) Greene
- Drakkaria venezuelae (Hack.) C.Silva & Zuloaga
- Echinochloa polystachya (Kunth) Hitchc.
- Echinochloa walteri (Pursh) A.Heller
- Ekmanochloa* Hitchc. – eastern Cuba
  - Ekmanochloa aristata* Ekman – eastern Cuba (Sierra de Moa)
  - Ekmanochloa subaphylla* Hitchc. – eastern Cuba (Sierra de Nipe)
- Eragrostis berteroniana (Schult.) Steud. – Cuba and Hispaniola
- Eragrostis cubensis Hitchc. – Cuba and Jamaica
- Eragrostis elliottii (Elliott) S.Watson
- Eragrostis glutinosa (Sw.) Trin.
- Eragrostis hypnoides (Lam.) Britton, Sterns & Poggenb.
- Eragrostis pectinacea (Michx.) Nees
- Eragrostis prolifera (Sw.) Steud.
- Eragrostis tephrosanthos Schult.
- Erianthus giganteus (Walter) P.Beauv.
- Eriochloa punctata (L.) Ham.
- Eriochloa setosa* (A.Rich.) Hitchc.
- Eustachys petraea (Sw.) Desv.
- Gouinia gracilis* Ekman
- Gouinia virgata (J.Presl) Scribn.
- Gynerium sagittatum (Aubl.) P.Beauv.
- Heteropogon contortus (L.) P.Beauv. ex Roem. & Schult.
- Homolepis glutinosa (Sw.) Zuloaga & Soderstr.
- Hymenachne amplexicaulis (Rudge) Nees
- Hymenachne donacifolia (Raddi) Chase
- Hymenachne grandis (Hitchc. & Chase) Zuloaga
- Ichnanthus nemorosus (Sw.) Döll
- Ichnanthus pallens (Sw.) Munro ex Benth.
- Imperata brasiliensis Trin.
- Imperata contracta Hitchc.
- Isachne leersioides* Griseb.
- Isachne polygonoides (Lam.) Döll
- Isachne rigidifolia (Poir.) Urb.
- Ixophorus unisetus (J.Presl) Schltdl.
- Lasiacis divaricata (L.) Hitchc.
- Lasiacis grisebachii (Nash) Hitchc.
- Lasiacis maculata (Aubl.) Urb.
- Lasiacis rhizophora (E.Fourn.) Hitchc. ex Chase
- Lasiacis rugelii (Griseb.) Hitchc.
- Lasiacis ruscifolia (Kunth) Hitchc. ex Chase
- Lasiacis sloanei (Griseb.) Hitchc.
- Leersia hexandra Sw.
- Leersia monandra Sw.
- Leptochloa anisopoda (B.L.Rob.) P.M.Peterson
- Leptochloa pluriflora (E.Fourn.) P.M.Peterson & N.Snow
- Leptochloa virgata (L.) P.Beauv.
- Lepturidium* Hitchc. & Ekman
  - Lepturidium insulare* Hitchc. & Ekman – I. de la Juventud
- Lithachne pauciflora (Sw.) P.Beauv.
- Lithachne pinetii* (C.Wright ex Griseb.) Chase
- Louisiella elephantipes (Nees ex Trin.) Zuloaga
- Luziola bahiensis (Steud.) Hitchc.
- Luziola peruviana J.F.Gmel.
- Luziola subintegra Swallen
- Mayariochloa* Salariato, Morrone & Zuloaga
  - Mayariochloa amphistemon* (C.Wright) Salariato, Morrone & Zuloaga – central and eastern Cuba
- Mesosetum loliiforme (Hochst. ex Steud.) Hitchc.
- Mesosetum wrightii* Hitchc.
- Mniochloa* Chase
  - Mniochloa pulchella* (Griseb.) Chase
- Muhlenbergia capillaris (Lam.) Trin.
- Muhlenbergia spiciformis Trin.
- Oedochloa mayarensis (C.Wright) C.Silva & R.P.Oliveira
- Olyra latifolia L.
- Oplismenus compositus (L.) P.Beauv.
- Oplismenus hirtellus (L.) P.Beauv.
- Oryza latifolia Desv.
- Panicum amarum Elliott
- Panicum aquaticum Poir.
- Panicum capillare L.
- Panicum catasusii* D.Morejón
- Panicum cayennense Lam.
- Panicum dichotomiflorum Michx.
- Panicum diffusum Sw.
- Panicum ghiesbreghtii E.Fourn.
- Panicum gouinii E.Fourn.
- Panicum hirsutum Sw.
- Panicum hirticaule J.Presl
- Panicum lacustre* Hitchc. & Ekman – western Cuba
- Panicum sellowii Nees
- Panicum trichanthum Nees
- Panicum trichoides Sw.
- Panicum virgatum L.
- Pappophorum pappiferum (Lam.) Kuntze
- Paratheria prostrata Griseb.
- Paspalum acuminatum Raddi
- Paspalum acutifolium León – Cuba and Bahamas
- Paspalum almum Chase
- Paspalum alterniflorum A.Rich – Cuba, Hispaniola, and Jamaica
- Paspalum amphicarpum* Ekman
- Paspalum arundinaceum Poir.
- Paspalum bakeri Hack. – western Cuba, Bahamas, and Venezuela
- Paspalum blodgettii Chapm.
- Paspalum breve Chase – Cuba, Hispaniola, Jamaica, and Windward Islands
- Paspalum caespitosum Flüggé
- Paspalum capillifolium* Nash
- Paspalum clavuliferum C.Wright
- Paspalum comasii Catasús – I. de la Juventud
- Paspalum conjugatum P.J.Bergius
- Paspalum decumbens Sw.
- Paspalum densum Poir.
- Paspalum dispar Chase
- Paspalum dissectum (L.) L.
- Paspalum distachyon Poir. ex Trin.
- Paspalum distichum L.
- Paspalum distortum Chase
- Paspalum edmondii* León
- Paspalum eglume Morrone & Zuloaga
- Paspalum filiforme Sw. – Cuba, Hispaniola, and Jamaica
- Paspalum fimbriatum Kunth
- Paspalum insulare* Ekman – I. de la Juventud
- Paspalum itaboense* Catasús – I. de la Juventud
- Paspalum langei (E.Fourn.) Nash
- Paspalum laxum Lam.
- Paspalum ligulare Nees
- Paspalum lindenianum A.Rich.
- Paspalum lineare Trin.
- Paspalum maritimum Trin.
- Paspalum melanospermum Desv. ex Poir.
- Paspalum millegranum Schrad.
- Paspalum minus E.Fourn.
- Paspalum motembense* León
- Paspalum multicaule Poir.
- Paspalum nanum* C.Wright ex Griseb.
- Paspalum nesiotes Chase – Cuba, Martinique, and St. Lucia
- Paspalum orbiculatum Poir.
- Paspalum paniculatum L.
- Paspalum plicatulum Michx.
- Paspalum pubiflorum Rupr. ex E.Fourn.
- Paspalum pulchellum Kunth
- Paspalum repens P.J.Bergius
- Paspalum reptatum* Hitchc. & Chase – Cuba and Jamaica
- Paspalum rocanum* León
- Paspalum rottboellioides* C.Wright
- Paspalum rupestre Trin. – Cuba, Hispaniola, and Puerto Rico
- Paspalum saugetii Chase
- Paspalum setaceum Michx.
- Paspalum stagnophilum Morrone & Zuloaga
- Paspalum unispicatum (Scribn. & Merr.) Nash
- Paspalum vaginatum Sw.
- Paspalum virgatum L.
- Paspalum wrightii Hitchc. & Chase
- Piresiella* Judz., Zuloaga & Morrone
  - Piresiella strephioides* (Griseb.) Judz., Zuloaga & Morrone – western Cuba
- Pharus lappulaceus Aubl.
- Pharus latifolius L.
- Pharus parvifolius Nash
- Reynaudia filiformis (Spreng. ex Schult.) Kunth – Cuba, Hispaniola, and Jamaica
- Rottboellia impressa* Griseb. – western Cuba
- Rottboellia tuberculosa (Nash) Hitchc.
- Rugoloa pilosa (Sw.) Zuloaga
- Rugoloa polygonata (Schrad.) Zuloaga
- Sacciolepis myuros (Lam.) Chase
- Sacciolepis striata (L.) Nash
- Sacciolepis striata (L.) Nash
- Schizachyrium brevifolium (Sw.) Nees ex Buse
- Schizachyrium cubense* (Hack.) Nash
- Schizachyrium gracile (Spreng.) Nash
- Schizachyrium malacostachyum (J.Presl) Nash
- Schizachyrium parvifolium* (Hitchc.) Borhidi & Catasús
- Schizachyrium reedii* (Hitchc. & Ekman) Borhidi & Catasús
- Schizachyrium sanguineum (Retz.) Alston
- Scutachne dura (Griseb.) Hitchc. & Chase – Cuba, Hispaniola, and Jamaica
- Setaria chapmanii (Vasey) Pilg.
- Setaria corrugata (Elliott) Schult.
- Setaria distantiflora (A.Rich.) Pilg.
- Setaria leonis (E.Ekman) León – Cuba, Hispaniola, Bahamas, and Turks and Caicos
- Setaria macrostachya Kunth
- Setaria magna Griseb.
- Setaria parviflora (Poir.) Kerguélen
- Setaria pradana (León ex C.L.Hitchc.) León – Cuba, Hispaniola, Puerto Rico, and Leeward Islands
- Setaria scandens Schrad.
- Setaria setosa (Sw.) P.Beauv.
- Setaria sulcata Raddi
- Setaria sulcata Raddi
- Setaria tenax (Rich.) Desv.
- Setaria utowanaea (Scribn.) Pilg.
- Sorghastrum setosum (Griseb.) Hitchc.
- Sporobolus cubensis Hitchc.
- Sporobolus domingensis (Trin.) Kunth
- Sporobolus indicus (L.) R.Br.
- Sporobolus pumilus (Roth) P.M.Peterson & Saarela
- Sporobolus purpurascens (Sw.) Ham.
- Sporobolus pyramidalis P.Beauv.
- Sporobolus pyramidatus (Lam.) Hitchc.
- Sporobolus tenuissimus (Mart. ex Schrank) Kuntze
- Sporobolus virginicus (L.) Kunth
- Stapfochloa ciliata (Sw.) P.M.Peterson
- Steinchisma exiguiflorum (Griseb.) W.V.Br. – Cuba, Bahamas, Hispaniola, and Jamaica
- Steinchisma laxum (Sw.) Zuloaga
- Stenotaphrum secundatum (Walter) Kuntze
- Tetrapogon fasciculatus (Hitchc. & Chase) P.M.Peterson – Cuba and Hispaniola
- Tetrapogon pleiostachyus* (Hitchc. & Ekman) P.M.Peterson
- Tibisia angustifolia* (Nash) C.D.Tyrrell, Londoño & L.G.Clark
- Tibisia farcta (Aubl.) C.D.Tyrrell, Londoño & L.G.Clark
- Tibisia pinifolia* (Catasús) C.D.Tyrrell, Londoño & L.G.Clark
- Trachypogon macroglossus Trin.
- Trachypogon spicatus (L.f.) Kuntze
- Trichanthecium cyanescens (Nees ex Trin.) Zuloaga & Morrone
- Trichanthecium parvifolium (Lam.) Zuloaga & Morrone
- Triplasiella eragrostoides (Vasey & Scribn.) P.M.Peterson & Romasch.
- Tripogonella spicata (Nees) P.M.Peterson & Romasch.
- Tripsacum dactyloides (L.) L.
- Tripsacum floridanum Porter ex Vasey – Cuba and Florida
- Triscenia* Griseb.
  - Triscenia ovina* Griseb.
- Uniola paniculata L.
- Uniola virgata (Poir.) Griseb.
- Urochloa adspersa (Trin.) R.D.Webster
- Urochloa fusca (Sw.) B.F.Hansen & Wunderlin
- Urochloa mollis (Sw.) Morrone & Zuloaga
- Urochloa plantaginea (Link) R.D.Webster
- Urochloa platyphylla (Munro ex C.Wright) R.D.Webster
- Urochloa polystachya (Kunth) Mabb.
- Zeugites americanus Willd.

== Podocarpaceae ==
- Podocarpus angustifolius* Griseb. – western and south-central Cuba
- Podocarpus aristulatus* Parl. – eastern Cuba
- Podocarpus ekmanii* Urb. – eastern Cuba
- Podocarpus victorinianus* Carabia – eastern Cuba

== Podostemaceae ==
- Marathrum cubanum* C.Wright
- Marathrum utile Tul.
- Tristicha trifaria (Bory ex Willd.) Spreng.

== Polygalaceae ==
- Asemeia grandiflora (Walter) Small
- Badiera cubensis* Britton
- Badiera oblongata Britton – Cuba, Bahamas, and Turks and Caicos Islands
- Badiera propinqua Britton – western Cuba and Cayman Islands
- Badiera virgata* Britton – eastern Cuba
- Phlebotaenia cuneata* Griseb.
- Securidaca diversifolia (L.) S.F.Blake
- Securidaca elliptica* Turcz.
- Securidaca virgata Sw.
- Senega appendiculata (Vell.) J.F.B.Pastore & J.R.Abbott
- Senega balduini (Nutt.) J.F.B.Pastore & J.R.Abbott
- Senega brachyptera* (Griseb.) J.F.B.Pastore & J.R.Abbott
- Senega glochidiata (Kunth) J.F.B.Pastore
- Senega longicaulis (Kunth) J.F.B.Pastore
- Senega millspaughiana* (Paiva) J.F.B.Pastore & J.R.Abbott
- Senega omissa* (Bal.-Tul. & P.Herrera) J.F.B.Pastore & J.R.Abbott
- Senega paniculata (L.) J.F.B.Pastore & J.R.Abbott
- Senega rhynchosperma* (S.F.Blake) J.F.B.Pastore & J.R.Abbott
- Senega saginoides* (Griseb.) J.F.B.Pastore & J.R.Abbott
- Senega spathulata (Griseb.) J.F.B.Pastore & J.R.Abbott – Cuba, Bahamas, and Jamaica
- Senega squamifolia* (C.Wright ex Griseb.) J.F.B.Pastore & J.R.Abbott
- Senega wilsonii (Small) J.F.B.Pastore & J.R.Abbott – Cuba and Bahamas

== Polygonaceae ==
- Coccoloba acuna* R.A.Howard – eastern Cuba
- Coccoloba alainii* Acev.-Rodr.
- Coccoloba armata* C.Wright ex Griseb.
- Coccoloba baracoensis* O.C.Schmidt – eastern Cuba
- Coccoloba benitensis* Britton – eastern Cuba
- Coccoloba berazainiae* I.Castañeda – eastern Cuba
- Coccoloba caesia* Ekman ex O.C.Schmidt – southeastern Cuba
- Coccoloba clementis* R.A.Howard – eastern Cuba
- Coccoloba coriacea* A.Rich. – northwestern and southeastern Cuba
- Coccoloba costata C.Wright – eastern Cuba, Hispaniola, and Puerto Rico
- Coccoloba cowellii* Britton – east-central Cuba
- Coccoloba cristalensis* (Alain) I.Castañeda – eastern Cuba
- Coccoloba diversifolia Jacq.
- Coccoloba geniculata* Lindau – central Cuba
- Coccoloba howardii* Castañeda – east-central Cuba
- Coccoloba × hybrida* I.Castañeda (C. diversifolia × C. uvifera) – eastern Cuba
- Coccoloba leonardii R.A.Howard – eastern Cuba, Haiti, and Navassa Island
- Coccoloba microphylla* Griseb.
- Coccoloba munizii* Borhidi – eastern Cuba
- Coccoloba nervosa* Alain – eastern Cuba
- Coccoloba nipensis* Urb. – eastern Cuba
- Coccoloba northropiae Britton – Cuba and Bahamas
- Coccoloba oligantha* Alain – eastern Cuba
- Coccoloba pallida* C.Wright ex Griseb. – northwestern Cuba
- Coccoloba praecox* C.Wright ex Lindau
- Coccoloba reflexa* Lindau – eastern Cuba
- Coccoloba retirensis* R.A.Howard – western Cuba (Retiro)
- Coccoloba retusa* Griseb.
- Coccoloba rufescens* C.Wright – eastern Cuba
- Coccoloba shaferi* Britton – eastern Cuba
- Coccoloba swartzii Meisn.
- Coccoloba tenuifolia L. – Cuba, Bahamas, Jamaica, Puerto Rico, and Turks and Caicos
- Coccoloba toaensis* Alain – eastern Cuba
- Coccoloba uvifera (L.) L.
- Coccoloba wrightii Lindau – south-central and southeastern Cuba and the Dominican Republic
- Coccoloba yaterensis* I.Castañeda – eastern Cuba (Ojito de Agua)
- Persicaria acuminata (Kunth) M.Gómez
- Persicaria ferruginea (Wedd.) Soják
- Persicaria glabra (Willd.) M.Gómez
- Persicaria hispida (Kunth) M.Gómez
- Persicaria hydropiperoides (Michx.) Small
- Persicaria meisneriana (Cham. & Schltdl.) M.Gómez
- Persicaria pensylvanica (L.) M.Gómez
- Persicaria punctata (Elliott) Small
- Persicaria segetum (Kunth) Small

== Polypodiaceae ==
- Arachniodes denticulata (Sw.) Ching
- Bolbitis aliena (Sw.) Alston
- Bolbitis portoricensis (Spreng.) Hennipman
- Campyloneurum angustifolium (Sw.) Fée
- Campyloneurum brevifolium (Lodd. ex Link) Link
- Campyloneurum costatum C.Presl
- Campyloneurum cubense Fée – Cuba, Hispaniola, and Jamaica
- Campyloneurum phyllitidis (L.) C.Presl
- Campyloneurum repens (Aubl.) C.Presl
- Ctenitis ampla (Humb. & Bonpl. ex Willd.) Ching
- Ctenitis crystallina (Kunze) Proctor – Cuba and Haiti
- Ctenitis grisebachii (Baker) Ching
- Ctenitis hirta (Sw.) Ching – Cuba, Bahamas, Dominican Republic, Jamaica, and Puerto Rico
- Ctenitis melanochlamys* (Fée) Ching
- Ctenitis santae-clarae* (C.Chr.) Ching
- Ctenitis sloanei (Poepp. ex Spreng.) C.V.Morton
- Ctenitis velata (Kunze ex Mett.) R.M.Tryon & A.F.Tryon
- Ctenitis vellea (Willd.) Proctor – Cuba, Hispaniola, and Jamaica
- Cyclopeltis semicordata (Sw.) J.Sm.
- Dryopteris viscidula (Mett.) Kuntze – Cuba and Jamaica
- Elaphoglossum apodum (Kaulf.) Schott
- Elaphoglossum chartaceum (Baker) C.Chr. – Cuba, Jamaica, and Puerto Rico
- Elaphoglossum crinitum (L.) Christ
- Elaphoglossum cubense (Mett.) C.Chr. – Cuba and Jamaica
- Elaphoglossum decoratum (Kunze) T.Moore
- Elaphoglossum decursivum Mickel
- Elaphoglossum denudatum (Jenman) Maxon ex C.V.Morton – Cuba, Jamaica, and Costa Rica
- Elaphoglossum drabifolium* Christ
- Elaphoglossum eggersii (Baker) Christ
- Elaphoglossum erinaceum (Fée) T.Moore
- Elaphoglossum flaccidum (Fée) T.Moore
- Elaphoglossum glabellum J.Sm.
- Elaphoglossum herminieri (Bory & Fée) T.Moore
- Elaphoglossum hirtum (Sw.) C.Chr.
- Elaphoglossum inaequalifolium (Jenman) C.Chr.
- Elaphoglossum latifolium (Sw.) J.Sm.
- Elaphoglossum lindenii (Bory ex Fée) T.Moore
- Elaphoglossum longifolium (C.Presl) J.Sm.
- Elaphoglossum maxonii Underw. ex C.V.Morton – Cuba, Jamaica, and Puerto Rico
- Elaphoglossum minutum (Pohl ex Fée) T.Moore
- Elaphoglossum muscosum (Sw.) T.Moore
- Elaphoglossum palmeri* Underw. & Maxon
- Elaphoglossum peltatum (Sw.) Urb.
- Elaphoglossum petiolatum (Sw.) Urb.
- Elaphoglossum procurrens (Mett. ex D.C.Eaton) T.Moore – Cuba and Haiti
- Elaphoglossum revolutum (Liebm.) T.Moore
- Elaphoglossum simplex (Sw.) Schott – Cuba, Haiti, Jamaica, and Puerto Rico
- Elaphoglossum squamipes (Hook.) T.Moore
- Elaphoglossum wrightii (Mett.) T.Moore – Cuba and Costa Rica
- Grammitis anfractuosa (Kunze ex Klotzsch) Proctor
- Grammitis asplenifolia (L.) Proctor
- Grammitis capillaris (Desv.) Proctor
- Grammitis cretata (Maxon) Proctor – Cuba, Hispaniola, and Jamaica
- Grammitis cultrata (Willd.) Proctor
- Grammitis curvata (Sw.) Ching – Cuba, Jamaica, Leeward and Windward Islands
- Grammitis delitescens (Maxon) Proctor
- Grammitis ecostata (Sodiro) Christenh.
- Grammitis elastica (Willd.) Christenh.
- Grammitis graminea (Sw.) Ching – Cuba and Jamaica
- Grammitis insidiosa (Sloss.) Proctor – Cuba, Hispaniola, and Jamaica
- Grammitis jenmanii (Underw. ex Maxon) Proctor – Cuba, Hispaniola, and Jamaica
- Grammitis jungens (L.E.Bishop) Proctor
- Grammitis kaieteura (Jenman) C.V.Morton
- Grammitis linearifolia (Desv.) Steud.
- Grammitis maxoniana* Lellinger
- Grammitis melanosticta (Kunze) F.Seym.
- Grammitis melete* Christenh.
- Grammitis mitchelliae (Baker) F.Seym.
- Grammitis mortonii* (Copel.) Lellinger
- Grammitis myosuroides (Sw.) Sw.
- Grammitis nimbata (Jenman) Proctor
- Grammitis rostrata (Hook.) R.M.Tryon & A.F.Tryon
- Grammitis serrulata (Sw.) Sw.
- Grammitis sherringii (Baker) Proctor – Cuba, Jamaica, and Puerto Rico
- Grammitis suspensa (L.) Proctor
- Grammitis taxifolia (L.) Proctor
- Grammitis trichomanoides (Sw.) Ching
- Grammitis trifurcata (L.) Copel.
- Grammitis turquina* (Maxon) Copel.
- Grammitis xiphopteroides (Liebm.) A.R.Sm.
- Lomariopsis jamaicensis (Underw.) Holttum – Cuba and Jamaica
- Lomariopsis kunzeana (C.Presl) Holttum – Cuba, southern Florida, Hispaniola, and Puerto Rico
- Lomariopsis underwoodii Holttum – Cuba and Jamaica
- Lomariopsis wrightii* Mett.
- Maxonia apiifolia (Sw.) C.Chr.
- Megalastrum gilbertii (Clute) R.C.Moran
- Megalastrum subincisum (Willd.) A.R.Sm. & R.C.Moran
- Mickelia guianensis (Aubl.) R.C.Moran, Labiak & Sundue
- Mickelia nicotianifolia (Sw.) R.C.Moran, Labiak & Sundue
- Mickelia pergamentacea (Maxon) R.C.Moran, Labiak & Sundue
- Microgramma heterophylla (L.) Wherry
- Microgramma lycopodioides (L.) Copel.
- Microgramma nana (Liebm.) T.E.Almeida
- Microgramma piloselloides (L.) Copel.
- Nephrolepis biserrata (Sw.) Schott
- Nephrolepis exaltata (L.) Schott
- Nephrolepis pectinata (Willd.) Schott
- Nephrolepis pendula J.Sm.
- Nephrolepis rivularis (Vahl) Mett.
- Niphidium crassifolium (L.) Lellinger
- Oleandra articulata (Sw.) C.Presl
- Olfersia alata* C.Sánchez & Caluff
- Olfersia cervina (L.) Kunze
- Parapolystichum confine (C.Chr.) Labiak, Sundue & R.C.Moran – Cuba and Haiti
- Parapolystichum effusum (Sw.) Ching
- Parapolystichum villosissimum* C.Sánchez & Labiak
- Pecluma absidata (A.M.Evans) M.G.Price
- Pecluma bourgeauana (E.Fourn.) L.A.Triana
- Pecluma camptophyllaria (Fée) M.G.Price
- Pecluma dispersa (A.M.Evans) M.G.Price
- Pecluma dulcis (Poir.) F.C.Assis & Salino
- Pecluma eurybasis (C.Chr.) M.G.Price
- Pecluma funicula (Fée) M.G.Price
- Pecluma otites (L.) L.Regalado & A.R.Schmidt – Cuba, Hispaniola, and Jamaica
- Pecluma pectinata (L.) M.G.Price
- Pecluma plumula (Humb. & Bonpl. ex Willd.) M.G.Price
- Phlebodium aureum (L.) J.Sm.
- Pleopeltis astrolepis (Liebm.) E.Fourn.
- Pleopeltis furcata (L.) A.R.Sm.
- Pleopeltis macrocarpa (Willd.) Kaulf.
- Pleopeltis marginata A.R.Sm. & Tejero
- Pleopeltis polypodioides (L.) E.G.Andrews & Windham
- Pleopeltis squamata J.Sm. – Cuba, Bahamas, Hispaniola, Jamaica, and Puerto Rico
- Pleopeltis thyssanolepis (A.Braun ex Klotzsch) E.G.Andrews & Windham
- Polybotrya osmundacea Humb. & Bonpl. ex Willd.
- Polypodium subpetiolatum Hook.
- Polystichopsis chaerophylloides (Poir.) C.V.Morton – Cuba, Hispaniola, Jamaica, Leeward Islands, and Puerto Rico
- Polystichopsis cubensis* (Kuhn) Lellinger
- Polystichopsis leucochaete (Sloss.) J.Prado & R.C.Moran – Cuba and Jamaica
- Polystichopsis lurida (Underw. & Maxon ex Sloss.) C.V.Morton – Cuba and Jamaica
- Polystichopsis puberula J.Prado & R.C.Moran – Cuba and Haiti
- Polystichopsis pubescens (L.) C.V.Morton – Cuba, Hispaniola, Jamaica, and Nicaragua
- Polystichopsis × sanchezii J.Prado & R.C.Moran ( P. chaerophylloides × P. pubescens) – Cuba and Jamaica
- Polystichopsis sericea (Mett. ex Eaton) C.Sánchez
- Polystichum decoratum Maxon – Cuba and Jamaica
  - Polystichum decoratum subsp. habanense* Morejón & C.Sánchez
- Polystichum deminuens* Maxon
- Polystichum echinatum (J.F.Gmel.) C.Chr.
- Polystichum guajaibonense* Morejón & C.Sánchez
- Polystichum heterolepis Fée – Cuba and Dominican Republic
- Polystichum ilicifolium* Fée
- Polystichum × machaerophyllum Sloss. – Cuba and Haiti
- Polystichum platyphyllum (Willd.) C.Presl
- Polystichum rhizophorum (Jenman) Maxon – Cuba, Hispaniola, and Jamaica
- Polystichum rhizophyllum (Sw.) C.Presl – Cuba, Jamaica, Leeward Islands, and Puerto Rico
  - Polystichum rhizophyllum subsp. cubense* (Mickel) Morejón & C.Sánchez
- Polystichum sanchezii* Morejón
- Polystichum submucronatum* (Christ) Morejón & C.Sánchez
- Polystichum triangulum (L.) Fée – Cuba and Hispaniola
- Polystichum wrightii* (Baker) C.Chr. ex Maxon
- Rumohra adiantiformis (G.Forst.) Ching
- Serpocaulon attenuatum (Humb. & Bonpl. ex Willd.) A.R.Sm.
- Serpocaulon dissimile (L.) A.R.Sm.
- Serpocaulon loriceum (L.) A.R.Sm.
- Serpocaulon sessilifolium (Desv.) A.R.Sm.
- Serpocaulon triseriale (Sw.) A.R.Sm.
- Stigmatopteris hemiptera* C.Chr.
- Stigmatopteris ichtiosma (Sodiro) C.Chr. – Cuba, Colombia, and Ecuador
- Stigmatopteris rotundata (Willd.) C.Chr.
- Tectaria caluffii* Riv.-Giró – eastern Cuba
- Tectaria cicutaria (L.) Copel. – Cuba, Hispaniola, Jamaica, and Puerto Rico
- Tectaria coriandrifolia Underw. – Cuba, Bahamas, southern Florida, and Jamaica
- Tectaria fimbriata (Willd.) Proctor & Lourteig
- Tectaria heracleifolia Underw.
- Tectaria incisa Cav.
- Tectaria pedata (Desv.) R.M.Tryon & A.F.Tryon – Cuba, Hispaniola, and Jamaica
- Tectaria prolifera (Hook.) R.M.Tryon & A.F.Tryon – Cuba, Dominican Republic, Jamaica, and Puerto Rico
- Tectaria squamosa* Riv.-Giró & C.Sánchez

== Pontederiaceae ==
- Heteranthera dubia (Jacq.) MacMill.
- Heteranthera limosa (Sw.) Willd.
- Heteranthera oblongifolia Mart. ex Schult. & Schult.f.
- Heteranthera reniformis Ruiz & Pav.
- Heteranthera spicata C.Presl
- Pontederia azurea Sw.
- Pontederia cordata L.
- Pontederia heterosperma (Alexander) M.Pell. & C.N.Horn
- Pontederia paniculata Spreng.

== Portulacaceae ==
- Portulaca biloba Urb. – Cuba, Dominica, southern Venezuela, and northeastern Brazil
- Portulaca brevifolia Urb. – Cuba, Haiti, and northwestern Venezuela
- Portulaca cubensis* Britton & P.Wilson
- Portulaca elatior Mart. ex Rohrb.
- Portulaca halimoides L.
- Portulaca nicaraguensis (Danin & H.G.Baker) Danin
- Portulaca pilosa L.
- Portulaca rubricaulis Kunth
- Portulaca teretifolia Kunth
- Portulaca tuberculata León – Cuba and Cayman Islands
- Portulaca umbraticola Kunth

== Potamogetonaceae ==
- Potamogeton diversifolius Raf.
- Potamogeton foliosus Raf.
- Potamogeton illinoensis Morong
- Potamogeton nodosus Poir.
- Potamogeton perfoliatus L.
- Stuckenia pectinata (L.) Börner

== Primulaceae ==
- Ardisia baracoensis* (Britton & P.Wilson) Alain – southeastern Cuba
- Ardisia dentata* (A.DC.) Mez – western Cuba
- Ardisia escallonioides Schltdl. & Cham.
- Ardisia grisebachiana* (Kuntze) Alain – southeastern Cuba
- Ardisia maestrensis* Urb. – southeastern Cuba
- Ardisia manitzii* Panfet – I. de la Juventud
- Ardisia mogotensis* Urb. – western Cuba
- Bonellia bissei* (Lepper) Lepper & J.E.Gut. – southeastern Cuba
- Bonellia brevifolia* (Urb.) B.Ståhl & Källersjö
- Bonellia brunnescens* (Urb.) Lepper & J.E.Gut. – western and northwestern Cuba
- Bonellia curtissii* (Britton) Lepper & J.E.Gut. – southwestern Cuba incl. I. de la Juventud
- Bonellia fruticulosa* Lepper & J.E.Gut. – central Cuba
- Bonellia lippoldii* (Lepper) B.Ståhl & Källersjö – southeastern Cuba
- Bonellia moana* (Borhidi) Lepper & J.E.Gut. – eastern Cuba
- Bonellia oligantha* (Borhidi) Lepper & J.E.Gut. – eastern Cuba
- Bonellia robusta* (Urb.) Lepper & J.E.Gut. – eastern Cuba
- Bonellia shaferi* (Urb.) B.Ståhl & Källersjö – eastern and east-central Cuba
- Bonellia stenophylla* (Urb.) B.Ståhl & Källersjö – western and west-central Cuba
- Bonellia stenophylloides* (Borhidi) Lepper & J.E.Gut. – east-central and southeastern Cuba
- Bonellia verrucosa* Lepper & J.E.Gut. – northwestern and central Cuba
- Jacquinia aculeata* (L.) Mez – Cuba and Hispaniola
- Jacquinia acunana* Borhidi & O.Muñiz – eastern Cuba
- Jacquinia berteroi Spreng.
- Jacquinia cristalensis* Lepper & J.E.Gut.
- Jacquinia curvata* Lepper & J.E.Gut. – east-central and eastern Cuba
- Jacquinia keyensis Mez
- Jacquinia maisiana* Borhidi & O.Muñiz – eastern Cuba
- Jacquinia obovata* Urb. – eastern Cuba
- Jacquinia roigii* P.Wilson – eastern Cuba
- Jacquinia sessiliflora* Alain – eastern Cuba (Sierra del Cristal)
- Jacquinia toldensis* Lepper & J.E.Gut. – eastern Cuba
- Jacquinia verticillaris* Urb. – eastern Cuba
- Lysimachia ovalis (Ruiz & Pav.) U.Manns & Anderb.
- Myrsine acrantha Krug & Urb. – Cuba, Cayman Islands, Hispaniola, and Jamaica
- Myrsine bissei* Panfet
- Myrsine coriacea (Sw.) R.Br. ex Roem. & Schult.
- Myrsine cristalensis* Borhidi
- Myrsine cubana A.DC.
- Myrsine pipolyi* Panfet
- Myrsine turquinensis* Panfet
- Neomezia* Votsch
  - Neomezia cubensis* (Radlk.) Votsch – western Cuba
- Parathesis cubana (A.DC.) Molinet & M.Gómez – Cuba and Mexico to Honduras
- Parathesis serrulata (Sw.) Mez
- Samolus ebracteatus Kunth
- Samolus parviflorus Raf.
- Solonia* Urb.
  - Solonia reflexa* Urb.
- Wallenia bumelioides* (Griseb.) Mez
- Wallenia jacquinioides* (Griseb.) Mez
- Wallenia laurifolia Sw. – Cuba, Bahamas, Hispaniola, and Jamaica
- Wallenia lepperi* Panfet & Ventosa
- Wallenia maestrensis* Panfet & Ventosa
- Wallenia subverticillata (Britton) Ekman ex Urb. – Cuba and Jamaica

== Psilotaceae ==
- Psilotum complanatum Sw.
- Psilotum nudum (L.) P.Beauv.

== Pteridaceae ==
- Acrostichum aureum L.
- Acrostichum danaeifolium Langsd. & Fisch.
- Adiantum alomae* Caluff
- Adiantum capillus-veneris L.
- Adiantum concinnum Humb. & Bonpl. ex Willd.
- Adiantum deltoideum Sw. – Cuba, Hispaniola, and Jamaica
- Adiantum fragile Sw.
- Adiantum fructuosum Kunze
- Adiantum kendalii Jenman
- Adiantum latifolium Lam.
- Adiantum macrophyllum Sw.
- Adiantum melanoleucum Willd.
- Adiantum obliquum Willd.
- Adiantum petiolatum Desv.
- Adiantum poiretii Wikstr.
- Adiantum pulverulentum L.
- Adiantum pyramidale (L.) Willd.
- Adiantum sericeum D.C.Eaton
- Adiantum tenerum Sw.
- Adiantum tetraphyllum Humb. & Bonpl. ex Willd.
- Adiantum trapeziforme L.
- Adiantum villosum L.
- Adiantum wilsonii Hook.
- Ananthacorus angustifolius (Sw.) Underw. & Maxon
- Ceratopteris pteridoides (Hook.) Hieron.
- Gastoniella chaerophylla (Desv.) Li Bing Zhang & Liang Zhang
- Hecistopteris pumila (A.Spreng.) J.Sm.
- Hemionitis concolor (Langsd. & Fisch.) Christenh.
- Hemionitis cubensis* (Weath. ex R.M.Tryon) Christenh.
- Hemionitis doryopteris Christenh.
- Hemionitis ekmanii* (Maxon) Christenh.
- Hemionitis harrisii (Maxon) Christenh.
- Hemionitis microphylla (Sw.) Christenh.
- Hemionitis palmata L.
- Hemionitis parvisegmenta* (M.S.Barker & Hickey) Christenh.
- Hemionitis paupercula (Kunze) Christenh. – Cuba, Jamaica, and Puerto Rico
- Hemionitis radiata (L.) Christenh.
- Hemionitis rufa (L.) Sw.
- Hemionitis rupicola* (Maxon) Christenh. – I. de la Juventud
- Hemionitis trichomanoides (L.) Christenh. – Cuba, Hispaniola, Jamaica, and Puerto Rico
- Hemionitis vincentii* (M.S.Barker & Hickey) Christenh.
- Hemionitis yorii* Christenh.
- Jamesonia hirta (Kunth) Christenh.
- Pityrogramma calomelanos (L.) Link
- Pityrogramma ebenea (L.) Proctor
- Pityrogramma eggersii* (Christ) Maxon
- Pityrogramma schizophylla (Baker) Maxon – Cuba, Haiti, and Jamaica
- Pityrogramma sulphurea (Sw.) Maxon – Cuba, Hispaniola, Jamaica, and Puerto Rico
- Pityrogramma trifoliata (L.) R.M.Tryon
- Polytaenium cajenense (Desv.) Benedict
- Polytaenium citrifolium (L.) Schuettp.
- Polytaenium dussianum (Benedict) Benedict – Cuba, Leeward Islands, Windward Islands, and Trinidad and Tobago
- Polytaenium feei (W.Schaffn. ex Fée) Maxon
- Polytaenium intramarginale (Baker ex Jenman) Alston
- Polytaenium lineatum (Sw.) J.Sm.
- Pteris altissima Poir.
- Pteris biaurita L.
- Pteris ciliaris* D.C.Eaton
- Pteris grandifolia L.
- Pteris hexagona (L.) Proctor – Cuba, Hispaniola, Jamaica, and Puerto Rico
- Pteris longifolia L.
- Pteris mutilata L. – Cuba, Haiti, and Puerto Rico
- Pteris plumieri Link
- Pteris podophylla Sw.
- Pteris purdoniana Maxon – Cuba and Jamaica
- Pteris stridens J.Agardh – Cuba, Haiti, and Jamaica
- Pteris swartziana J.Agardh – Cuba and Jamaica
- Radiovittaria remota (Fée) E.H.Crane
- Radiovittaria stipitata (Kunze) E.H.Crane
- Vittaria graminifolia Kaulf.
- Vittaria lineata (L.) Sm.

== Putranjivaceae ==
- Drypetes alba Poit.
- Drypetes lateriflora (Sw.) Krug & Urb.
- Drypetes mucronata C.Wright ex Griseb.

== Ranunculaceae ==
- Clematis dioica L.
- Clematis flammulastrum Griseb. Cuba, Cayman Islands, Hispaniola, Jamaica, and Puerto Rico
- Clematis polygama Jacq.
- Ranunculus recurvatus Poir.

== Resedaceae ==
- Forchhammeria emarginata* Alain – eastern Cuba
- Forchhammeria polyandra* (Griseb.) Alain – eastern Cuba
- Forchhammeria trifoliata Radlk. ex Millsp.

== Rhamnaceae ==
- Auerodendron acuminatum* (Griseb.) Urb. – western Cuba
- Auerodendron acunae* Borhidi & O.Muñiz
- Auerodendron cubense* (Britton & P.Wilson) Urb. – central and eastern Cuba
- Auerodendron glaucescens* Urb. – eastern Cuba
- Auerodendron martii* Alain – western Cuba
- Auerodendron northropianum (Urb.) Urb. – Cuba and Bahamas
- Auerodendron reticulatum* (Griseb.) Urb. – eastern Cuba
- Auerodendron truncatum* (Urb.) Urb. – eastern Cuba
- Colubrina acunae* Kitan.
- Colubrina arborescens (Mill.) Sarg.
- Colubrina cubensis (Jacq.) Brongn. – western and west-central Cuba and Cayman Islands
  - Colubrina cubensis var. ekmanii M.C.Johnst. – eastern Cuba
- Colubrina elliptica (Sw.) Brizicky & W.L.Stern
- Colubrina glandulosa G.Perkins
  - Colubrina glandulosa var. nipensis (M.C.Johnst.) M.C.Johnst. – eastern Cuba (Sierra de Nipe)
- Doerpfeldia* Urb.
  - Doerpfeldia cubensis* (Britton) Urb. – east-central and eastern Cuba
- Frangula sphaerosperma (Sw.) Kartesz & Gandhi
- Gouania ekmanii* Alain
- Gouania lupuloides (L.) Urb.
- Gouania polygama (Jacq.) Urb.
- Karwinskia angustata* Borhidi & O.Muñiz
- Karwinskia bicolor* (Britton & P.Wilson) Urb.
- Karwinskia oblongifolia* (Britton & P.Wilson) Urb.
- Karwinskia orbiculata* (Britton & P.Wilson) Urb.
- Karwinskia potrerilloana* (Borhidi & O.Muñiz) Borhidi
- Karwinskia rocana* (Britton & P.Wilson) Urb.
- Krugiodendron ferreum (Vahl) Urb.
- Reynosia camagueyensis* Britton
- Reynosia latifolia* Griseb.
- Reynosia microphylla* Ekman ex Urb.
- Reynosia moaensis* Borhidi & O.Muñiz – eastern Cuba
- Reynosia mucronata* Griseb.
- Reynosia retusa* Griseb.
- Reynosia revoluta* (C.Wright ex Griseb.) Urb.
- Reynosia septentrionalis Urb. – Cuba and southern Florida
- Reynosia wrightii* Urb.
- Rhamnidium brevifolium* Borhidi
- Rhamnidium ellipticum* Britton & P.Wilson
- Rhamnidium nipense* Urb. – eastern Cuba
- Rhamnidium pruinosum* Urb.
- Rhamnidium shaferi* Britton & P.Wilson
- Sarcomphalus acutifolius* Griseb.
- Sarcomphalus bidens* Urb.
- Sarcomphalus divaricatus* Griseb.
- Sarcomphalus havanensis (Kunth) Griseb. – Cuba and Haiti
  - Sarcomphalus havanensis var. bullatus* (Urb.) Hauenschild
- Sarcomphalus obovatus* Urb.
- Sarcomphalus rhodoxylon* (Urb.) Hauenschild – Cuba and Hispaniola

== Rhizophoraceae ==
- Cassipourea elliptica (Sw.) Poir.
- Rhizophora mangle L.

== Rosaceae ==
- Prunus myrtifolia (L.) Urb.
- Prunus occidentalis Sw.
- Rubus durus* C.Wright
- Rubus grisebachii* (Focke) Focke – western Cuba
- Rubus turquinensis* Rydb.

== Rubiaceae ==
- Acrosynanthus latifolius* Standl. – eastern Cuba
- Acrosynanthus minor* Urb. – eastern Cuba
- Acrosynanthus ovatus* Urb. – eastern Cuba
- Acrosynanthus parvifolius* Britton ex Standl. – eastern Cuba
- Acrosynanthus revolutus* Urb. – eastern Cuba
- Acrosynanthus trachyphyllus* Standl.
- Acunaeanthus* Borhidi, Komlódi & Moncada
  - Acunaeanthus tinifolius* (Griseb.) Borhidi
- Alibertia edulis (Rich.) A.Rich. ex DC.
- Amaioua glomerulata (Lam. ex Poir.) Delprete & C.H.Perss.
- Bertiera gonzaleoides* Griseb. – western Cuba
- Bertiera guianensis Aubl.
- Calycophyllum candidissimum (Vahl) DC.
- Casasia acunae* M.Fernández & Borhidi – eastern Cuba
- Casasia calophylla* A.Rich.
- Casasia clusiifolia (Jacq.) Urb. – Cuba, Bahamas, Bermuda, and south Florida
  - Casasia clusiifolia var. hirsuta* Borhidi
- Casasia jacquinioides* (Griseb.) Standl.
- Casasia nigrescens* (Griseb.) C.Wright ex Rob.
- Catesbaea flaviflora* Urb. – eastern Cuba
- Catesbaea gamboana* Urb. – eastern Cuba
- Catesbaea grayi Griseb. – Cuba and Haiti
- Catesbaea holacantha* C.Wright ex Griseb.
- Catesbaea holacantha* C.Wright ex Griseb.
- Catesbaea macracantha* C.Wright
- Catesbaea nana* Greenm.
- Catesbaea parviflora Sw.
- † Catesbaea phyllacantha* Griseb. northwestern Cuba (coastal Toscano); last recorded in 1923
- Catesbaea spinosa L. Cuba and Bahamas
- Cephalanthus occidentalis L.
- Ceratopyxis* Hook.f.
  - Ceratopyxis verbenacea* (Griseb.) Hook.f. – western Cuba
- Chimarrhis cubensis* Steyerm. – western and southeastern Cuba
- Chiococca alba (L.) Hitchc.
- Chione venosa (Sw.) Urb.
  - Chione venosa var. myrtifolia* (Griseb.) Borhidi
- Chomelia fasciculata (Sw.) Sw. – western Cuba, Jamaica, and the Windward Islands
- Coccocypselum cordifolium Nees & Mart.
- Coccocypselum glaberrimum* Hadac
- Coccocypselum herbaceum P.Browne ex Aubl.
- Coccocypselum hirsutum Bartl. ex DC.
- Coccocypselum oblongatum* Urb.
- Colleteria exserta (DC.) David W.Taylor – southeastern Cuba and Hispaniola
- Coussarea vaginata* (Griseb.) M.Gómez
- Cubanola daphnoides* (Graham) Aiello
- Declieuxia fruticosa (Willd.) Kuntze
- Diodia simplex Sw. – Cuba and Jamaica
- Diodia virginiana L.
- Edrastima uniflora (L.) Raf.
- Elaeagia cubensis* Britton – eastern Cuba
- Eosanthe* Urb.
  - Eosanthe cubensis* Urb. – northeastern Cuba (Sierra del Cristal)
- Erithalis fruticosa L.
- Erithalis salmeoides Correll – Cuba, Bahamas, Dominican Republic, Jamaica, and Turks and Caicos
- Erithalis vacciniifolia (Griseb.) C.Wright – eastern Cuba, Bahamas (Andros I.), and Dominican Republic (including Beata Is.)
- Ernodea littoralis Sw.
- Ernodea taylorii Britton – Cuba, Bahamas, Cayman Islands, and Haiti
- Eumachia acuifolia Delprete & J.H.Kirkbr. – Cuba and Dominican Republic
- Eumachia agustinae (Acuña) C.M.Taylor & Razafim. – eastern Cuba
- Eumachia microdon (DC.) Delprete & J.H.Kirkbr.
- Eumachia nutans (Sw.) C.M.Taylor & Razafim.
- Exostema caribaeum (Jacq.) Schult.
- Exostema glaberrimum* Borhidi & M.Fernández
- Exostema lancifolium* Borhidi & Acuña – eastern Cuba
- Exostema purpureum* Griseb.
- Exostema salicifolium* Griseb.
- Exostema spinosum (Le Vavass.) Krug & Urb. – Cuba and Hispaniola
- Faramea occidentalis (L.) A.Rich.
- Galium domingense Iltis – Cuba and Hispaniola
- Genipa americana L.
- Geophila minutiflora* Alain – southeastern Cuba
- Geophila repens (L.) I.M.Johnst.
- Gonzalagunia brachyantha (A.Rich.) Urb. – Cuba, Hispaniola, and Jamaica
- Gonzalagunia panamensis (Cav.) K.Schum.
- Gonzalagunia sagrana* Urb. – western Cuba
- Guettarda amblyophylla* Urb. & Ekman – Pinar del Río
- Guettarda baracoensis* Bisse
- Guettarda brevinodis* Urb.
- Guettarda calcicola* Britton – Pinar del Río
- Guettarda calyptrata* A.Rich.
- Guettarda camagueyensis* Britton
- Guettarda clarensis* Britton
- Guettarda cobrensis* Standl. – eastern Cuba
- Guettarda combsii Urb.
- Guettarda coxiana* Britton – eastern Cuba
- Guettarda crassipes* Britton – eastern Cuba
- Guettarda cueroensis Britton – eastern Cuba and Hispaniola
- Guettarda elegans* Urb.
- Guettarda elliptica Sw.
- Guettarda ferruginea* Griseb.
- Guettarda inaequipes* Urb.
- Guettarda lanuginosa* Urb. & Britton
- Guettarda leonis* Alain
- Guettarda lindeniana A.Rich. – Cuba and Hispaniola
- Guettarda macrocarpa* Griseb. – eastern Cuba
- Guettarda monocarpa* Urb. – eastern Cuba
- Guettarda munizii* Borhidi
- Guettarda nervosa* Urb. & Ekman
- Guettarda organosia* Urb. – Pinar del Río
- Guettarda pinariona* Urb. – Pinar del Río
- † Guettarda retusa* C.Wright – Pinar del Río
- Guettarda rigida* A.Rich.
- Guettarda roigiana* Borhidi & O.Muñiz
- Guettarda scabra (L.) Vent.
- Guettarda sciaphila* Urb. – eastern Cuba
- Guettarda shaferi* Standl. – eastern Cuba
- Guettarda sierrae* P.A.González & J.L.Gómez
- Guettarda undulata* Griseb.
- Guettarda urbanii* Ekman
- Guettarda valenzuelana A.Rich. – Cuba, Hispaniola, and Puerto Rico
- Hamelia axillaris Sw.
- Hamelia cuprea Griseb. – southwestern Cuba, Haiti (Massif de la Hotte), Jamaica, and Grand Cayman I.
- Hamelia patens Jacq.
- Hexasepalum apiculatum (Willd.) Delprete & J.H.Kirkbr.
- Hexasepalum lippioides* (Griseb.) J.H.Kirkbr. & Delprete
- Hexasepalum sarmentosum (Sw.) Delprete & J.H.Kirkbr.
- Hexasepalum serrulatum (P.Beauv.) J.H.Kirkbr. & Delprete
- Hexasepalum teres (Walter) J.H.Kirkbr.
- Hillia parasitica Jacq.
- Hillia tetrandra Sw.
- Isertia haenkeana DC.
- Isidorea acunae* (Borhidi) Borhidi – eastern Cuba
- Isidorea brachycarpa* (Urb.) Aiello – eastern Cuba (Baracoa)
- Isidorea elliptica* Alain – eastern Cuba
- Isidorea leonis* Alain – eastern Cuba
- Isidorea microphylla* Borhidi – eastern Cuba
- Isidorea oblanceolata* (Urb.) Aiello – eastern Cuba (Sierra de Nipe)
- Isidorea ophiticola* (Borhidi) Borhidi - eastern Cuba
- Isidorea polyneura* (Urb.) Aiello - eastern Cuba
- Isidorea rheedioides* Borhidi – eastern Cuba
- Ixora ferrea (Jacq.) Benth.
- Ixora floribunda (A.Rich.) Griseb.
- Lasianthus lanceolatus (Griseb.) Urb. – Cuba, Hispaniola, Jamaica, and Puerto Rico
- Lucya tetrandra (L.) K.Schum. – Cuba, Hispaniola, Jamaica, and Puerto Rico
- Machaonia acunae* Borhidi & M.Fernández – I. de la Juventud
- Machaonia dumosa* Borhidi & M.Fernández – Pinar del Río
- Machaonia havanensis (Jacq. ex J.F.Gmel.) Alain – Cuba, Belize, and southeastern Mexico
  - Machaonia havanensis subsp. orientalis* Borhidi & M.Fernández – Tunas
- Machaonia micrantha* Borhidi & M.Fernández – eastern Cuba
- Machaonia microphylla* Griseb. – eastern Cuba
- Machaonia minutifolia* Britton & P.Wilson
- Machaonia nipensis* Borhidi & M.Fernández – eastern Cuba
- Machaonia pauciflora* Urb. – western Cuba incl. I. de la Juventud
- Machaonia pubescens* Borhidi & M.Fernández – central Cuba
- Machaonia subinermis* Urb.
- Machaonia tiffina* Urb. & Ekman – Camagüey
- Machaonia urbaniana* Standl. eastern Cuba (Santiago de Cuba)
- Machaonia urbinoi* Borhidi & O.Muñiz – Holguin: Cerro Galano
- Manettia lygistum (L.) Sw. – Cuba and Jamaica
- Manettia reclinata L.
- Mazaea* Krug & Urb.
  - Mazaea phialanthoides* (Griseb.) Krug & Urb. – western Cuba
  - Mazaea shaferi* (Standl.) Delprete – northeastern Cuba (Holguín)
- Micrasepalum eritrichoides* (C.Wright ex Griseb.) Urb.
- Mitracarpus acunae* Alain – eastern Cuba
- Mitracarpus depauperatus* Britton & P.Wilson – I. de la Juventud
- Mitracarpus fortunii* Britton & P.Wilson – Cuba and Hispaniola
- Mitracarpus glabrescens (Griseb.) Urb.
- Mitracarpus hirtus (L.) DC.
- Mitracarpus laeteviridis* C.Wright
- Mitracarpus linearifolius A.Rich.
- Mitracarpus sagranus DC. – Cuba and Hispaniola
- Mitracarpus scaberulus* Urb. – western Cuba
- Mitracarpus squarrosus* (Poepp. ex Cham. & Schltdl.) Cham. & Schltdl. ex DC.
- Mitracarpus tenuis* Urb. – eastern Cuba
- Morinda moaensis* Alain – eastern Cuba
- Morinda royoc L.
- Nertera granadensis (Mutis ex L.f.) Druce
- Nodocarpaea* A.Gray
  - Nodocarpaea radicans* (Griseb.) A.Gray
- Notopleura parasitica (Sw.) Hammel
- Notopleura uliginosa (Sw.) Bremek.
- Oldenlandia capillipes* Griseb.
- Oldenlandia maestrensis* Alain – eastern Cuba
- Oldenlandia polyphylla* Urb. – eastern Cuba
- Oldenlandiopsis callitrichoides (Griseb.) Terrell & W.H.Lewis
- Ottoschmidtia microphylla (Griseb.) Urb. – Cuba and Hispaniola
  - Ottoschmidtia microphylla subsp. microphylla*
- Palicourea acuminata (Benth.) Borhidi
- Palicourea alpina (Sw.) DC. – Cuba, Hispaniola, Jamaica, and Puerto Rico
- Palicourea berteroana (DC.) Borhidi
- Palicourea brachiata (Sw.) Borhidi
- Palicourea brachystigma Urb. – Cuba and Hispaniola
- Palicourea crocea (Sw.) Schult.
- Palicourea croceoides Ham.
- Palicourea deflexa (DC.) Borhidi
- Palicourea domingensis (Jacq.) DC.
- Palicourea ekmanii* (Urb.) Borhidi & Oviedo – eastern Cuba
- Palicourea guianensis Aubl.
- Palicourea hoffmannseggiana (Willd. ex Schult.) Borhidi
- Palicourea moralesii* (Acuña & Roíg) Borhidi – eastern Cuba
- Palicourea odorata* (C.Wright ex Griseb.) Borhidi & Oviedo – eastern Cuba
- Palicourea orientensis* Borhidi & Oviedo
- Palicourea polymorpha* (Greuter) Borhidi & Oviedo
- Palicourea pubescens (Sw.) Borhidi
- Palicourea richardiana* (Urb.) Borhidi & Oviedo
- Palicourea toensis* (Britton & P.Wilson) Standl. – eastern Cuba
- Palicourea triphylla DC.
- Phialanthus acunae* Borhidi – eastern Cuba
- Phialanthus alainii* Borhidi
- Phialanthus bissei* (Borhidi) Borhidi – I. de la Juventud
- Phialanthus ellipticus* Urb. – eastern Cuba
- Phialanthus glaberrimus* Borhidi – southeastern Cuba
- Phialanthus guantanamensis* Borhidi
- Phialanthus inflatus* Borhidi – eastern Cuba
- Phialanthus linearis* Alain – eastern Cuba
- Phialanthus macrocalyx* Borhidi – eastern Cuba
- Phialanthus macrostemon* Standl. – Cabonico
- Phialanthus marianus* Borhidi – San Antonio
- Phialanthus myrtilloides Griseb.
- Phialanthus oblongatus* Urb. – eastern Cuba
- Phialanthus parvifolius* Urb. – eastern Cuba
- Phialanthus peduncularis* Borhidi – Sierra del Cristal
- Phialanthus resinifluus* Griseb. – eastern Cuba
- Phialanthus rigidus* Griseb. – western Cuba
- Phialanthus stillans* Griseb. – western Cuba
- Phyllomelia* Griseb.
  - Phyllomelia coronata* Griseb. – western Cuba
- Picardaea cubensis (Griseb.) Britton ex Urb. southeastern Cuba and western and southern Hispaniola
- Posoqueria latifolia (Rudge) Schult.
- Psychotria acunae* Borhidi
- Psychotria alainii* Acuña & Roíg – eastern Cuba
- Psychotria auriculata* C.Wright ex Griseb.
- † Psychotria banaona* Urb. – Sancti Spiritus
- Psychotria bermejalensis* Britton – eastern Cuba
- Psychotria bialata* C.Wright ex Griseb.
- Psychotria bissei* Borhidi & Oviedo
- Psychotria brevinodis* Urb. eastern Cuba (Sierra de Gran Piedra)
- Psychotria brevistipula* Urb.
- Psychotria brittonii* Oviedo & Borhidi
- Psychotria byrsonimifolia* Acuña & Roíg – eastern Cuba
- Psychotria carthagenensis Jacq.
- Psychotria cathetoneura* Urb. – eastern Cuba
- Psychotria costivenia Griseb.
  - Psychotria costivenia subsp. clementis* (Britton) Borhidi & Oviedo
  - Psychotria costivenia subsp. wrightiana* Borhidi & Oviedo
- Psychotria cristalensis* Urb. – eastern Cuba
- Psychotria cromophila* Oviedo & Borhidi
- Psychotria earlei* Urb. – western and west-central Cuba
- Psychotria ebracteata* Urb.
- Psychotria ermitensis* Borhidi & Oviedo
- Psychotria evenia* C.Wright ex Griseb.
- Psychotria geronensis* Urb. – I. de la Juventud
- Psychotria glabrata Sw. – Cuba, Hispaniola, Jamaica, Leeward Islands, and Puerto Rico
- Psychotria graminifolia* Urb. – eastern Cuba
- Psychotria grandis Sw.
- Psychotria greeneana* Urb.
- Psychotria gundlachii* Urb.
- Psychotria horizontalis Sw.
- Psychotria lasiophthalma Griseb. – Cuba and Haiti
- Psychotria leonis* Britton & P.Wilson – eastern Cuba
- Psychotria ligustrifolia (Northr.) Millsp.
- Psychotria lopezii* Acuña & Roíg
- Psychotria marginata Sw.
- Psychotria moensis* Britton & P.Wilson – eastern Cuba
- Psychotria naguana* Urb. – eastern Cuba
- Psychotria nervosa Sw.
- Psychotria oblongicarpa* Borhidi & Oviedo
- Psychotria obovalis* A.Rich.
- Psychotria ossaeana* Urb. – eastern Cuba
- Psychotria pachythalla* Urb. – eastern Cuba
- Psychotria pinetorum* Urb. – Pinar del Río
- Psychotria ponce-leonis* Acuña & Roíg – eastern Cuba
- Psychotria pulchrinervis* Borhidi & Oviedo
- Psychotria rectinervis* Urb. – eastern Cuba
- Psychotria reflexiloba* Borhidi & Oviedo
- Psychotria reflexipes* Borhidi & Oviedo
- Psychotria revoluta DC. – Cuba, Hispaniola, and Puerto Rico
- Psychotria rivularis* Urb.
- Psychotria rubens* Borhidi & Oviedo
- Psychotria rufovaginata* Griseb.
- Psychotria sauvallei* Urb. – western Cuba incl. I. de la Juventud
- Psychotria shaferi* Urb. – eastern Cuba
- Psychotria sphaeroidea* Urb. – eastern Cuba
- Psychotria subvelutina* Ekman & Urb.
- Psychotria tenuifolia Sw.
- Psychotria thelophora* Urb.
- Psychotria torrei* Acuña & Roíg – eastern Cuba
- Psychotria tubulocubensis* Govaerts – I. de la Juventud
- Psychotria vanhermanii* Acuña & Roíg – eastern Cuba
- Psychotria viridis Ruiz & Pav.
- Rachicallis americana (Jacq.) Hitchc.
- Ramonadoxa* Paudyal & Delprete
  - Ramonadoxa cubensis* (Urb.) Paudyal & Delprete – eastern Cuba
- Randia aculeata L.
- Randia acunae* Borhidi
- Randia ciliolata* C.Wright
- Randia costata* Borhidi
- Randia cubana* Borhidi
- Randia spinifex* (Roem. & Schult.) Standl.
- Randia tomatillo Loes.
- Richardia arenicola* (Britton & P.Wilson) W.H.Lewis & R.L.Oliv. – western Cuba
- Richardia ciliata* (Britton & P.Wilson) W.H.Lewis & R.L.Oliv. – I. de la Juventud
- Richardia muricata* (Griseb.) B.L.Rob. – western Cuba (I. de la Juventud)
- Richardia pectidifolia* (Urb.) Borhidi – central and eastern Cuba
- Richardia scabra L.
- Roigella correifolia* (Griseb.) Borhidi & M.Fernández – western Cuba (I. de la Juventud)
- Rondeletia acunae* Borhidi & M.Fernández
- Rondeletia alaternoides* A.Rich.
- Rondeletia apiculata* Urb. – eastern Cuba
- Rondeletia arida* Borhidi & M.Fernández
- Rondeletia avenia* C.Wright – western Cuba
- Rondeletia azulensis* Urb. – eastern Cuba
- Rondeletia baracoensis* Britton
- Rondeletia bicolor* Britton
- Rondeletia bissei* Borhidi & M.Fernández
- Rondeletia bracteosa* Borhidi & M.Fernández
- Rondeletia calophylla* Standl. – eastern Cuba
- Rondeletia camarioca* C.Wright
- Rondeletia chamaebuxifolia* Griseb.
- Rondeletia combsii* Greenm.
- Rondeletia combsioides* M.Fernández & Borhidi
- Rondeletia convoluta* M.Fernández & Borhidi
- Rondeletia coronata* Urb. – eastern Cuba
- Rondeletia cristalensis* Urb. – eastern Cuba
- Rondeletia diplocalyx* Urb. – eastern Cuba
- Rondeletia ekmanii* Britton & Standl. – eastern Cuba
- Rondeletia fortunensis* Borhidi
- Rondeletia galanensis* M.Fernández & Borhidi
- Rondeletia glomeruliflora* Alain – eastern Cuba
- Rondeletia grandisepala* Alain – eastern Cuba
- Rondeletia hypoleuca* Griseb. – eastern Cuba
- Rondeletia × incerta* Borhidi & M.Fernández (R. miraflorens × R. subcanescens)
- Rondeletia ingrata* Standl. – southeastern Cuba
- Rondeletia insularis* Britton
- Rondeletia intermixta* Britton
- Rondeletia leonii* Britton
- Rondeletia lindeniana* A.Rich. – eastern Cuba
- Rondeletia linearisepala* Alain – eastern Cuba
- Rondeletia lomensis* Urb. – eastern Cuba
- Rondeletia lucida* M.Fernández & Borhidi
- Rondeletia micarensis* Urb. – eastern Cuba
- Rondeletia microphylla* Griseb.
- Rondeletia minutifolia* Urb. – western Cuba
- Rondeletia miraflorensis* M.Fernández & Borhidi
- Rondeletia naguensis* Britton & P.Wilson – eastern Cuba
- Rondeletia nimanimae* Krug & Urb. – eastern Cuba
- Rondeletia nipensis* Urb. – eastern Cuba
- Rondeletia × obscura* Borhidi & M.Fernández (R. paucinervis × R. plicatula) – eastern Cuba
- Rondeletia odorata* Jacq.
- Rondeletia pachyphylla* Krug & Urb.
- Rondeletia papayoensis* M.Fernández & Borhidi
- Rondeletia paucinervis* Urb. & Ekman – eastern Cuba
- Rondeletia pedicellaris* C.Wright
- Rondeletia peduncularis* A.Rich.
- Rondeletia peninsularis* M.Fernández & Borhidi
- Rondeletia plicatula* Urb. – eastern Cuba
- Rondeletia potrerillona* Urb. & Ekman
- Rondeletia pseudorugelii* Borhidi & M.Fernández
- Rondeletia pycnophylla* Urb. – eastern Cuba
- Rondeletia rigida* Griseb.
- Rondeletia rugelii* Urb.
- Rondeletia savannarum* Britton – eastern Cuba
- Rondeletia shaferi* Urb. & Britton – eastern Cuba
- Rondeletia steirophylla* Urb. – eastern Cuba
- Rondeletia steirophylloides* Borhidi & M.Fernández
- Rondeletia subcanescens* M.Fernández & Borhidi
- Rondeletia subglabra* Krug & Urb.
- Rondeletia susannae* Borhidi
- Rondeletia toaensis* M.Fernández & Borhidi
- Rondeletia tubulosa* Borhidi & M.Fernández
- Rondeletia vacciniifolia* Britton – eastern Cuba
- Rondeletia vazquezii* Borhidi & O.Muñiz – eastern Cuba
- Rondeletia venosa* Griseb. – western Cuba
- Schmidtottia* Urb. – eastern Cuba
  - Schmidtottia corymbosa* Borhidi – eastern Cuba (Sierra de Moa)
  - Schmidtottia cubensis* (Standl.) Urb. – eastern Cuba
  - Schmidtottia cucullata* Borhidi – eastern Cuba (Sierra de Moa)
  - Schmidtottia elliptica* (Britton) Urb. – eastern Cuba
  - Schmidtottia involucrata* (Wernham) Alain – eastern Cuba
  - Schmidtottia marmorata* Urb. – eastern Cuba (Sierra Sagua Baracoa)
  - Schmidtottia monantha* Urb. – eastern Cuba
  - Schmidtottia monticola* Borhidi – eastern Cuba (Sierra de Moa)
  - Schmidtottia multiflora* Urb. – eastern Cuba
  - Schmidtottia neglecta* (Borhidi) Borhidi – eastern Cuba (Sierra de Moa)
  - Schmidtottia nitens* (Britton) Urb. – eastern Cuba (Sierra Sagua Baracoa)
  - Schmidtottia parvifolia* Alain – eastern Cuba (Peña Prieta)
  - Schmidtottia scabra* Borhidi & Acuña – eastern Cuba (Sierra de Moa)
  - Schmidtottia sessilifolia* (Britton) Urb. – eastern Cuba (Sierra de Moa)
  - Schmidtottia shaferi* (Standl.) Urb. – eastern Cuba
  - Schmidtottia stricta* Borhidi – eastern Cuba (Sierra de Moa)
  - Schmidtottia uliginosa* (Wernham) Urb. – eastern Cuba
- Schradera cubensis* Steyerm. – eastern Cuba
- Schradera exotica (J.F.Gmel.) Standl.
- Scolosanthus acunae* Borhidi & O.Muñiz – Pinar del Río
- Scolosanthus bahamensis Britton – Cuba and Bahamas
- Scolosanthus crucifer* C.Wright
- Scolosanthus densiflorus Urb. – southeastern Cuba and Haiti
- Scolosanthus ekmanii* Borhidi – eastern Cuba
- Scolosanthus granulatus* Urb. – eastern Cuba
- Scolosanthus hirsutus* Borhidi – southeastern Cuba
- Scolosanthus hispidus* Borhidi - eastern Cuba
- Scolosanthus lucidus* Britton – eastern Cuba
- Scolosanthus maestrensis* Alain – eastern Cuba
- Scolosanthus moanus* Borhidi & O.Muñiz – eastern Cuba
- Scolosanthus nannophyllus* Borhidi – eastern Cuba
- Scolosanthus pycnophyllus* Borhidi
- Scolosanthus reticulatus* Borhidi
- Scolosanthus strictus* Urb. – eastern Cuba
- Scolosanthus wrightianus* (Griseb.) C.Wright
- Shaferocharis* Urb.
  - Shaferocharis cubensis* Urb. – eastern Cuba
  - Shaferocharis multiflora* Borhidi & O.Muñiz – eastern Cuba
  - Shaferocharis villosa* Borhidi & Bisse – eastern Cuba
- Siemensia* Urb.
  - Siemensia pendula* (C.Wright ex Griseb.) Urb.
- Solenandra cordata* (Borhidi & M.Fernández) Borhidi – eastern Cuba
- Solenandra curbeloi* (Borhidi & M.Fernández) Borhidi – eastern Cuba
- Solenandra elliptica (Griseb.) Paudyal & Delprete – Cuba, Hispaniola, and Puerto Rico
  - Solenandra elliptica subsp. monticola* (Borhidi & M.Fernández) Borhidi & M.Fernández – southeastern Cuba
- Solenandra ixoroides* Hook.f.
- Solenandra longiflora (Lamb.) Paudyal & Delprete – Cuba and Hispaniola
- Solenandra microcarpa* (Borhidi & M.Fernández) Borhidi – eastern Cuba
- Solenandra myrtifolia* (Griseb.) Borhidi
- Solenandra parviflora (A.Rich. ex Bonpl.) Borhidi – Cuba and Hispaniola
- Solenandra pervestita* (Borhidi & M.Fernández) Borhidi – eastern Cuba
- Solenandra pulverulenta* (Borhidi) Borhidi
- Solenandra rotundata* (Griseb.) Paudyal & Delprete
- Solenandra selleana (Urb. & Ekman) Borhidi – eastern Cuba and Hispaniola
- Solenandra stenophylla* (Britton) Paudyal & Delprete – eastern Cuba
- Solenandra velutina* (Standl.) Borhidi
- Spermacoce aretioides* (Griseb.) Kuntze
- Spermacoce confusa Rendle
- Spermacoce densiflora (DC.) Alain
- Spermacoce exasperata* Urb. – eastern Cuba
- Spermacoce exilis (L.O.Williams) C.D.Adams ex W.C.Burger & C.M.Taylor
- Spermacoce macrocephala (Standl. & Steyerm.) Govaerts – western Cuba, Colombia (Guainía), and Venezuela (Amazonas)
- Spermacoce matanzasia* (Urb.) Borhidi
- Spermacoce microcephala* A.Rich.
- Spermacoce obscura DC. – Cuba and Hispaniola
- Spermacoce ocymifolia Willd.
- Spermacoce oligantha* Urb. – eastern Cuba
- Spermacoce ovalifolia (M.Martens & Galeotti) Hemsl.
- Spermacoce prostrata Aubl.
- Spermacoce remota Lam.
- Spermacoce rubricaulis* C.Wright
- Spermacoce squamosa* (C.Wright ex Griseb.) Kuntze
- Spermacoce strumpfioides* (C.Wright ex Griseb.) C.Wright
- Spermacoce suaveolens (G.Mey.) Kuntze
- Spermacoce tenuior L.
- Spermacoce tetraquetra A.Rich.
- Spermacoce thymocephala* (Griseb.) C.Wright
- Spermacoce verticillata L.
- Stenostomum abbreviatum* (Urb.) Borhidi & M.Fernández
- Stenostomum apiculatum Britton & Standl. – eastern Cuba and Hispaniola
- Stenostomum aristatum* Britton
- Stenostomum baracoense* Borhidi
- Stenostomum biflorum* Borhidi – eastern Cuba (Sierra del Cristal)
- Stenostomum cuspidatum* Borhidi – eastern Cuba (Sierra de Moa)
- Stenostomum densiflorum C.Wright ex Griseb. eastern Cuba, Bahamas, and Haiti
- Stenostomum granulatum Griseb. – Cuba and Hispaniola
- Stenostomum imbricatum* Borhidi – eastern Cuba
- Stenostomum lucidum (Sw.) C.F.Gaertn.
- Stenostomum maestrense* (Urb.) Borhidi & M.Fernández – eastern Cuba
- Stenostomum minutifolium* (Borhidi & Capote) Borhidi & M.Fernández – eastern Cuba
- Stenostomum mucronatum* (Urb.) Borhidi & M.Fernández – eastern Cuba (Sierra de Nipe)
- Stenostomum multinerve* (Urb.) Borhidi & M.Fernández – eastern Cuba (Sierra de Moa)
- Stenostomum myrtifolium Griseb. – Cuba, Bahamas, Dominican Republic, and Turks and Caicos
- Stenostomum nipense* (Borhidi & O.Muñiz) Borhidi & M.Fernández – eastern Cuba
- Stenostomum occidentale* (Urb.) Borhidi & M.Fernández – I. de la Juventud
- Stenostomum ophiticola* (Alain) Borhidi & M.Fernández – eastern Cuba
- Stenostomum orbiculare* (Alain) Borhidi & M.Fernández – eastern Cuba
- Stenostomum pedicellare* (Borhidi & Bisse) Borhidi & M.Fernández – Holguín
- Stenostomum radiatum Griseb. – Cuba and Haiti
  - Stenostomum radiatum subsp. radiatum*
- Stenostomum reticulare* Borhidi & M.Fernández – eastern Cuba (Sierra de Moa)
- Stenostomum revolutum* Borhidi – eastern Cuba
- Stenostomum rotundatum* Griseb. – western Cuba
- Stenostomum scrobiculatum* (Urb.) Borhidi & M.Fernández – eastern Cuba
- Stenostomum shaferi* (Urb.) Borhidi & M.Fernández - eastern Cuba
- Stenostomum urbanianum (C.T.White) Borhidi & M.Fernández
- Strumpfia maritima Jacq.
- Suberanthus × angustatus* (C.Wright ex Griseb.) Borhidi (S. brachycarpus × S. neriifolius)
- Suberanthus brachycarpus* (Griseb.) Borhidi & M.Fernández – Cuba and Hispaniola
- Suberanthus canellifolius* (Britton) Borhidi & M.Fernández – eastern Cuba
- Suberanthus neriifolius* (A.Rich.) Borhidi & M.Fernández
- Suberanthus × nipensis* Borhidi & M.Fernández (S. brachycarpus × S. canellifolius)
- Suberanthus stellatus* (Griseb.) Borhidi & M.Fernández
- Suberanthus yumuriensis* (Britton) Borhidi & M.Fernández – eastern Cuba
- Thogsennia lindeniana (A.Rich.) Aiello – eastern Cuba and Dominican Republic
- Tocoyena cubensis Britton ex Standl.

== Ruppiaceae ==
- Ruppia maritima L.

== Rutaceae ==
- Amyris balsamifera L.
- † Amyris cubensis* (Borhidi & Acuña) Beurton – eastern Cuba (Sierra de Moa); last recorded in 1945.
- Amyris diatrypa Spreng.
- Amyris elemifera L.
- Amyris lineata* C.Wright ex Griseb.
- Amyris polymorpha* Urb.
- Amyris polyneura* Urb.
- Amyris stromatophylla* P.Wilson
- † Angostura ossana* (DC.) Beurton western Cuba (San Diego de los Baños)
- Helietta glaucescens* Urb.
- Pilocarpus cubensis* (Borhidi & O.Muñiz) Lippold
- Pilocarpus racemosus Vahl
- Plethadenia cubensis* Urb.
- Ravenia baracoensis* Borhidi & O.Muñiz
- Ravenia clementiana* Vict.
- Ravenia shaferi* P.Wilson
- Ravenia simplicifolia* C.Wright ex P.Wilson
- Ravenia spectabilis (Lindl.) Engl. – Cuba and Haiti
  - Ravenia spectabilis subsp. leonis (Vict.) Beurton
- Spathelia brittonii* P.Wilson
- Spathelia cubensis* P.Wilson
- Spathelia splendens* Urb.
- Spathelia subintegra* Vict.
- Spathelia vernicosa* Planch.
- Spathelia wrightii* Vict.
- Zanthoxylum acuminatum (Sw.) Sw.
- Zanthoxylum amplicalyx* Reynel
- Zanthoxylum bissei* Beurton – eastern Cuba
- Zanthoxylum caribaeum Lam.
- Zanthoxylum dumosum* A.Rich.
- Zanthoxylum ekmanii (Urb.) Alain
- Zanthoxylum fagara (L.) Sarg.
- Zanthoxylum flavum Vahl
- Zanthoxylum martinicense (Lam.) DC.
- Zanthoxylum nashii P.Wilson – Cuba and Hispaniola
- Zanthoxylum phyllopterum* (Griseb.) C.Wright
- Zanthoxylum pimpinelloides (Lam.) DC. – Cuba and Hispaniola
- Zanthoxylum rhodoxylon (Urb.) P.Wilson – Cuba, Bahamas, Dominican Republic, and Jamaica
- Zanthoxylum spinosum (Sw.) Sw.
- Zanthoxylum taediosum A.Rich. – Cuba and Hispaniola
  - Zanthoxylum taediosum subsp. shaferi* (P.Wilson) Reynel
  - Zanthoxylum taediosum subsp. taediosum*
- Zanthoxylum tragodes (L.) DC.

== Sabiaceae ==
- Meliosma oppositifolia* Griseb.

== Saccolomataceae ==
- Saccoloma chartaceum G.B.Nair
- Saccoloma domingense (Spreng.) Urb.
- Saccoloma inaequale (Kunze) Mett.

== Salicaceae ==
- Banara acunae* Borhidi & O.Muñiz
- Banara brittonii* Roíg – western Cuba (Pinar del Rio and I. de la Juventud)
- Banara minutiflora (A.Rich.) Sleumer – Cuba and Bahamas
- Banara riscoi* Borhidi & O.Muñiz
- Banara wilsonii* Alain – western Cuba
- Casearia aculeata Jacq.
- Casearia aquifolia* C.Wright – eastern Cuba
- Casearia arborea (Rich.) Urb.
  - Casearia arborea subsp. occidentalis* J.E.Gut.
- Casearia bissei* J.E.Gut.
- Casearia comocladiifolia Vent. – eastern Cuba and Hispaniola
- Casearia crassinervis* Urb. – eastern Cuba
- Casearia dodecandra (Jacq.) T.Samar. & M.H.Alford
- Casearia dolichanthera* T.Samar. & M.H.Alford
- Casearia emarginata C.Wright ex Griseb. – Cuba, Haiti, and southeastern Mexico
- Casearia guianensis (Aubl.) Urb.
- Casearia hirsuta Sw.
- Casearia laetioides (A.Rich.) Warb.
- Casearia lunana* (P.Wilson) Greuter & R.Rankin
- Casearia moaensis* Vict. – eastern Cuba
- Casearia mollis Kunth
- Casearia nitida (L.) Jacq.
- Casearia ophiticola* Vict. – eastern Cuba
- Casearia praecox Griseb.
- Casearia ophiticola* Vict. – eastern Cuba
- Casearia praecox Griseb.
- Casearia pseudophiticola* J.E.Gut.
- Casearia ramosissima* C.Wright ex Griseb.
- Casearia spinescens (Sw.) Griseb.
- Casearia sylvestris Sw.
  - Casearia sylvestris subsp. myricoides* (Griseb.) J.E.Gut.
- Casearia ternstroemioides* (Griseb.) T.Samar. & M.H.Alford
- Casearia thamnia (L.) T.Samar. & M.H.Alford
- Casearia tremula (Griseb.) Griseb. ex C.Wright
- Homalium racemosum Jacq.
- Lunania cubensis* Turcz.
- Lunania divaricata* Benth.
- Lunania dodecandra* C.Wright ex Griseb.
- Lunania elongata* Britton & P.Wilson
- Lunania sauvallei* Griseb.
- Lunania subcoriacea* Britton & P.Wilson
- Prockia crucis P.Browne ex L.
- Xylosma acunae* Borhidi & O.Muñiz
- Xylosma buxifolia A.Gray
- Xylosma claraensis* Urb.
- Xylosma iberiensis* J.E.Gut.
- Xylosma nipensis* Borhidi – eastern Cuba
- Xylosma rhombifolia (Britton & P.Wilson) Sleumer
- Xylosma roigiana* Borhidi
- Xylosma schaefferioides A.Gray
- Xylosma shaferi* (P.Wilson) R.A.Howard & W.R.Briggs

== Salviniaceae ==
- Azolla caroliniana Willd.
- Salvinia auriculata Aubl.
- Salvinia minima Baker

== Santalaceae ==
- Antidaphne wrightii (Griseb.) Kuijt – southeastern Cuba, Hispaniola, and Puerto Rico
- Dendrophthora arcuata* C.Wright
- Dendrophthora bonaniae (Griseb.) Eichler
- Dendrophthora brachyclada* Urb. – eastern Cuba
- Dendrophthora brachylepis Urb. – Cuba and Hispaniola
- Dendrophthora buxifolia (Lam.) Eichler – east-central and eastern Cuba and Hispaniola
- Dendrophthora confertiflora* Krug & Urb. – southeastern Cuba (Sierra Maestra)
- Dendrophthora constricta* (Griseb.) Eichler – eastern Cuba
- Dendrophthora cubensis Eichler – Cuba, Dominican Republic, Guadeloupe, and Dominica
- Dendrophthora cupressoides (Griseb.) Eichler – eastern Cuba, Hispaniola, and Jamaica
- Dendrophthora domingensis (Spreng.) Eichler – Cuba, Hispaniola, and Puerto Rico
- Dendrophthora epiviscum* (Griseb.) Eichler – east-central and eastern Cuba
- Dendrophthora excisa* Urb. – southeastern Cuba (Sierra Maestra)
- Dendrophthora flagelliformis (Lam.) Krug & Urb. – Cuba, Hispaniola, and Puerto Rico
- Dendrophthora glauca* (C.Wright ex Griseb.) Eichler – east-central and central Cuba
- Dendrophthora grandifolia* Eichler – eastern Cuba
- Dendrophthora lamprophylla (Urb.) Urb. – eastern Cuba and Haiti
- Dendrophthora lanceifolia* Urb. – eastern Cuba
- Dendrophthora laxiflora* Urb. – western Cuba
- Dendrophthora mancinellae (C.Wright ex Griseb.) Eichler – Cuba and Haiti
- Dendrophthora marmeladensis Urb. – eastern Cuba and Hispaniola
- Dendrophthora picotensis* Urb. – southeastern Cuba
- Dendrophthora podocarpicola* Leiva – eastern Cuba
- Dendrophthora remotiflora Urb. – eastern Cuba and Hispaniola
- Dendrophthora serpyllifolia (Griseb.) Krug & Urb. – Cuba and Hispaniola
- Dendrophthora sessilifolia* (Griseb.) Krug & Urb.
- Dendrophthora tetrastachya (Griseb.) Urb. – eastern Cuba and Hispaniola
- Phoradendron anceps (Spreng.) M.Gómez
- Phoradendron berteroanum (DC.) Griseb.
- Phoradendron gundlachii* Krug & Urb.
- Phoradendron hexastichum (DC.) Griseb.
- Phoradendron piperoides (Kunth) Trel.
- Phoradendron quadrangulare (Kunth) Griseb.
- Phoradendron racemosum (Aubl.) Krug & Urb.
- Phoradendron rubrum (L.) Griseb.

== Sapindaceae ==
- Allophylus cominia (L.) Sw.
  - Allophylus cominia var. parvifolia* Kitan.
- Allophylus crassinervis Radlk. – Cuba, Hispaniola, and Puerto Rico
- Allophylus cristalensis* Lippold – eastern Cuba
- Allophylus maestrensis* Lippold – southeastern Cuba
- Allophylus racemosus Sw.
- Allophylus reticulatus* Radlk. – eastern Cuba
- Cardiospermum corindum L.
- Cardiospermum halicacabum L.
- Cardiospermum microcarpum Kunth
- Cupania americana L.
- Cupania glabra Sw.
- Cupania juglandifolia A.Rich.
- Dodonaea viscosa Jacq.
- † Euchorium Ekman & Radlk.
  - † Euchorium cubense* Ekman & Radlk. – western Cuba (Sierra del Rosario, Viñales); last recorded in 1924
- Exothea diphylla (Standl.) Lundell
- Exothea paniculata (Juss.) Radlk.
- Hypelate trifoliata Sw.
- Matayba apetala (Griseb.) Radlk.
- Matayba domingensis (DC.) Radlk. – Cuba, Hispaniola, and Puerto Rico
- Matayba oppositifolia (A.Rich.) Britton
- Paullinia fuscescens Kunth
- Paullinia jamaicensis Macfad. Cuba, Dominican Republic (Beata I.), and Jamaica
- Paullinia pinnata L.
- Sapindus saponaria L.
- Serjania adusta Radlk.
- Serjania atrolineata C.Wright
- Serjania caracasana (Jacq.) Willd.
- Serjania crassinervis Radlk.
- Serjania crenata Griseb.
- Serjania diversifolia (Jacq.) Radlk.
- Serjania lineariifolia* Lippold – southeastern Cuba
- Serjania microphylla* Lippold
- Serjania nipensis Urb. – eastern Cuba
- Serjania occidentalis Lippold – western Cuba
- Serjania subdentata Juss. ex Poir. – Cuba, Bahamas, Cayman Islands, and Hispaniola
- Thouinia acunae* Borhidi & O.Muñiz
- Thouinia baracoensis* Borhidi
- Thouinia canescens* Radlk.
- Thouinia clarensis* Lippold
- Thouinia cubensis* Radlk.
- Thouinia gibarensis* P.A.González & J.L.Gómez
- Thouinia holguinensis* Lippold – eastern Cuba
- Thouinia hypoleuca* Borhidi – eastern Cuba
- Thouinia leonis* Alain – eastern Cuba
- Thouinia maestrensis* Lippold – southeastern Cuba
- Thouinia patentinervis Radlk. – Cuba and Dominican Republic
- Thouinia punctata* Radlk. – eastern Cuba
- Thouinia rotundata* C.Wright – western Cuba
- Thouinia stricta* Lippold – southeastern Cuba
- Thouinia trifoliata Poit. – Cuba and Hispaniola
- Urvillea ulmacea Kunth

== Sapotaceae ==
- Chrysophyllum argenteum Jacq.
- Chrysophyllum oliviforme L.
- Labatia sessiliflora Sw. – Cuba and Hispaniola
- Lucuma dominigensis C.F.Gaertn. – Cuba, Bahamas, Florida, and Hispaniola
- Lucuma multiflora A.DC.
- Manilkara jaimiqui (C.Wright ex Griseb.) Dubard
  - Manilkara jaimiqui subsp. jaimiqui*
  - Manilkara jaimiqui subsp. wrightiana* (Pierre) Cronquist
- Manilkara mayarensis* (Ekman ex Urb.) Cronquist – eastern Cuba
- Manilkara sideroxylon (Griseb.) Dubard – eastern Cuba and Jamaica
- Manilkara valenzuelana (A.Rich.) T.D.Penn – Cuba, Hispaniola, and Puerto Rico
- Micropholis polita (Griseb.) Pierre – eastern Cuba and Haiti
  - Micropholis polita subsp. polita* – eastern Cuba
- Pouteria aristata* (Britton & P.Wilson) Baehni
- Pouteria cubensis* – eastern Cuba (Sierra Maestra)
- Pouteria dictyoneura* (Griseb.) Radlk. – Cuba, Hispaniola, and Puerto Rico
  - Pouteria dictyoneura subsp. dictyoneura*
- Pouteria micrantha* (Urb.) Baehni – Cuba (Lomas de Cuaba, Sierra de Nipe)
- Sideroxylon acunae* (Borhidi) T.D.Penn. – eastern Cuba
- Sideroxylon americanum (Mill.) T.D.Penn.
- Sideroxylon celastrinum (Kunth) T.D.Penn.
- Sideroxylon cubense (Griseb.) T.D.Penn. – Cuba, Hispaniola, Puerto Rico, and St. Kitts & Nevis
- Sideroxylon ekmanianum* (Urb.) Bisse – southeastern Cuba
- Sideroxylon foetidissimum Jacq.
- Sideroxylon horridum (Griseb.) T.D.Penn. – Cuba and Cayman Islands
- Sideroxylon jubilla* (Ekman ex Urb.) T.D.Penn. – eastern Cuba
- Sideroxylon moaense* (Bisse & J.E.Gut.) J.E.Gut. – eastern Cuba
- Sideroxylon portoricense Urb.
- Sideroxylon salicifolium (L.) Lam.

== Schisandraceae ==
- Illicium cubense* A.C.Sm.
- Illicium guajaibonense* (Imkhan.) Judd & J.R.Abbott – western Cuba
- Illicium rangelense* (Imkhan.) García-Beltrán – western Cuba

== Schizaeaceae ==
- Anemia adiantifolia (L.) Sw.
- Anemia alternifolia* Mickel
- Anemia cicutaria Kuntze – Cuba, Bahamas, Guatemala, and southeastern Mexico
- Anemia coriacea* Griseb.
- Anemia cuneata* Kunze
- Anemia hirsuta (L.) Sw.
- Anemia hirta (L.) Sw.
- Anemia hispida Kunze
- Anemia obovata* Maxon
- Anemia phyllitidis (L.) Sw.
- Anemia pumilio* Mickel
- Anemia speciosa C.Presl
- Anemia underwoodiana Maxon – Cuba, Haiti, and Jamaica
- Anemia wrightii Baker – Cuba, Bahamas, and southern Florida
- Lygodium cubense* Kunth
- Lygodium oligostachyum (Willd.) Desv. – Cuba, Hispaniola, and northwestern Venezuela
- Lygodium venustum Sw.
- Lygodium volubile Sw.
- Schizaea pennula Sw.
- Schizaea poeppigiana J.W.Sturm

== Schlegeliaceae ==
- Schlegelia brachyantha Griseb.
- Synapsis* Griseb.
  - Synapsis ilicifolia* Griseb. – eastern Cuba

== Schoepfiaceae ==
- Schoepfia cubensis* Britton & P.Wilson
- Schoepfia didyma* C.Wright ex Griseb.
- Schoepfia obovata C.Wright
- Schoepfia paradoxa* (Bisse & Berazaín) Berazaín ex Acev.-Rodr.
- Schoepfia schreberi J.F.Gmel.
- Schoepfia scopulorum* Alain
- Schoepfia stenophylla* Urb. – southeastern Cuba

== Scrophulariaceae ==
- Bontia daphnoides L.
- Buddleja americana L.
- Capraria biflora L.
  - Capraria biflora subsp. havanensis* Tzvelev
- Scrophularia minutiflora Pennell – Cuba, Hispaniola, Jamaica, and Puerto Rico

== Selaginellaceae ==
- Selaginella achotalensis* Shelton & Caluff
- Selaginella apoda (L.) C.Morren
- Selaginella armata Baker – Cuba, Dominican Republic, Jamaica, and Puerto Rico
- Selaginella bracei Hieron. ex O.C.Schmidt – Cuba and Bahamas (Andros)
- Selaginella caluffii* Shelton
- Selaginella cavernaria* Caluff & Shelton
- Selaginella convoluta (Arn.) Spring
- Selaginella cordifolia (Desv.) Spring – Cuba, Dominican Republic, and Puerto Rico
- Selaginella cristalensis* Shelton & Caluff
- Selaginella × dualis* Caluff & Shelton (S. serpens × S. striata)
- Selaginella epipubens* Caluff & Shelton
- Selaginella flabellum (Desv.) Spring – Cuba and Hispaniola
- Selaginella heterodonton (Desv.) Hieron. ex Urb. – Cuba, Hispaniola, and Jamaica
- Selaginella ivanii* Shelton & Caluff
- Selaginella microdendron Baker Cuba, Belize, Guatemala, and Honduras
- Selaginella myriostachya* Valdespino, C.López & L.A.Góes
- Selaginella nanophylla* Valdespino, C.López & L.A.Góes
- Selaginella orbiculifolia* Shelton & Caluff
- Selaginella ovifolia Baker
- Selaginella phiara* Valdespino, C.López & L.A.Góes
- Selaginella plagiochila* Baker
- Selaginella plumieri Hieron. – Cuba and Hispaniola
- Selaginella plumosa (L.) C.Presl
- Selaginella prasina* Baker
- Selaginella rotundifolia Spring – Cuba, Haiti, and Leeward and Windward islands
- Selaginella sellowii Hieron.
- Selaginella serpens (Desv.) Spring – Cuba, Dominican Republic, Jamaica, and Leeward and Windward Islands
- Selaginella striata* Caluff & Shelton
- Selaginella tenella (P.Beauv.) Spring
- Selaginella undata* Shelton & Caluff
- Selaginella urquiolae* Caluff & Shelton
- Selaginella wilsonii* Hieron.

== Simaroubaceae ==
- Castela calcicola* (Britton & Small) Ekman ex Urb. – western Cuba
- Castela greuteri* A.Noa – southestern Cuba
- Castela jacquiniifolia* (Small) Ekman ex Urb. – eastern Cuba
- Castela manitzii* A.Noa – eastern Cuba
- Castela spinosa* Cronquist – western Cuba
- Picrasma cubensis* Radlk. & Urb. – western Cuba (Sierra de los Organos)
- Picrasma excelsa (Sw.) Planch.
- Picrasma pauciflora* A.Noa & P.A.González – eastern Cuba (Loma El Templo)
- Picrasma tetramera* (Urb.) W.W.Thomas – south-central Cuba
- Simarouba glauca DC.
- Simarouba laevis* Griseb.

== Smilacaceae ==
- Smilax aquifolium* Ferrufino & Greuter – western Cuba
- Smilax canellifolia Mill. – Cuba, Cayman Islands, Hispaniola, and Jamaica
- Smilax cristalensis* Ferrufino & Greuter – southeastern Cuba
- Smilax cuprea* Ferrufino & Greuter – eastern Cuba
- Smilax domingensis Willd.
- Smilax gracilior Ferrufino & Greuter – central and eastern Cuba and Bahamas
- Smilax havanensis Jacq. – Cuba, Bahamas, Cayman Islands, Florida, and Turks and Caicos
- Smilax laurifolia L.
- Smilax mollis Humb. & Bonpl. ex Willd.

== Solanaceae ==
- Browallia americana L.
- Brunfelsia acunae* Hadač
- Brunfelsia americana L.
- Brunfelsia cestroides* A.Rich.
- Brunfelsia clarensis* Britton & P.Wilson – eastern Cuba
- Brunfelsia grisebachii* Amshoff
- Brunfelsia linearis* Ekman ex Urb.
- Brunfelsia macroloba* Urb.
- Brunfelsia nitida* Benth.
- Brunfelsia pluriflora* Urb.
- Brunfelsia purpurea* Griseb.
- Brunfelsia shaferi* Britton & P.Wilson
- Brunfelsia sinuata* A.Rich.
- Capsicum annuum L.
- Capsicum frutescens L.
- Cestrum bahamense Britton – Cuba and Bahamas
- Cestrum buxoides* Ekman ex Urb. – eastern Cuba
- Cestrum citrifolium Retz. – Cuba, Hispaniola, Puerto Rico, and Leeward and Windward islands
- Cestrum daphnoides Griseb. – Cuba and Hispaniola
- Cestrum diurnum L.
- Cestrum ekmanii* Urb. & O.E.Schulz – eastern Cuba
- Cestrum ferrugineum* A.Rich.
- Cestrum hirtum Sw. – eastern Cuba and Jamaica
- Cestrum macrophyllum Vent.
- Cestrum moaense* Borhidi & O.Muñiz
- Cestrum moquinianum* Dunal – western Cuba
- Cestrum pinetorum* Britton – eastern Cuba
- Cestrum taylorii* Britton & P.Wilson – eastern Cuba
- Cestrum turquinense* Urb. – eastern Cuba
- Espadaea* A.Rich.
  - Espadaea amoena* A.Rich.
- Henoonia* Griseb.
  - Henoonia myrtifolia* Griseb.
- Iochroma arborescens (L.) J.M.H.Shaw
- Jaltomata antillana (Krug & Urb.) D'Arcy – Cuba, Hsiapniola, Jamaica, and Puerto Rico
- Lycianthes lenta (Cav.) Bitter
- Lycianthes virgata (Lam.) Bitter
- Lycium americanum Jacq.
- Lycium carolinianum Walter
- Lycium martii Sendtn. – Cuba and northeastern Brazil
- Melananthus cubensis Urb. – Cuba and northern and eastern Brazil
- Nicotiana repanda Willd. ex Lehm. – Cuba, eastern Mexico, and Texas
- Physalis angulata L.
- Physalis cordata Houst. ex Mill.
- Physalis ignota Britton
- Physalis lagascae Roem. & Schult.
- Physalis philadelphica Lam.
- Physalis pubescens L.
- Physalis solanacea (Schltdl.) Axelius
- Schwenckia americana L.
- Schwenckia filiformis* Ekman ex Urb.
- Solandra grandiflora Sw.
- Solandra longiflora Tussac
- Solanum americanum Mill.
- Solanum bahamense L.
- Solanum boldoense Dunal & A.DC. – Cuba and Haiti
- Solanum campechiense L.
- Solanum chamaeacanthum* Griseb.
- Solanum erianthum D.Don
- Solanum gundlachii Urb. – Cuba and Haiti
- Solanum havanense Jacq. – Cuba, Cayman Islands, and Jamaica
- Solanum jamaicense Mill.
- Solanum maestrense* Urb.
- Solanum mammosum L.
- Solanum moense* Britton & P.Wilson – eastern Cuba (Sierra de Moa)
- Solanum nigrescens M.Martens & Galeotti
- Solanum nudum Humb. & Bonpl. ex Dunal
- Solanum pachyneurum O.E.Schulz
- Solanum polyacanthos Lam. – Cuba and Hispaniola
- Solanum pyrifolium Lam. – southeastern Cuba, Cayman Islands, and Hispaniola
- Solanum rugosum Dunal
- Solanum schlechtendalianum Walp.
- Solanum seaforthianum Andrews
- Solanum tampicense Dunal
- Solanum tetramerum Dunal – Cuba, Hispaniola, and Jamaica
- Solanum umbellatum Mill.

== Stegnospermataceae ==
- Stegnosperma cubense A.Rich.

== Styracaceae ==
- Styrax obtusifolius Griseb. – Cuba and Hispaniola

== Surianaceae ==
- Suriana maritima L.

== Symplocaceae ==
- Symplocos baracoensis* P.W.Fritsch & Almeda
- Symplocos ciponimoides* Griseb. – southeastern Cuba
- Symplocos cubensis Griseb. – southeastern Cuba and Hispaniola
- Symplocos jurgensenii Hemsl.
- Symplocos leonis* Britton & P.Wilson – southeastern Cuba
- Symplocos lindeniana* Krug & Urb.
- Symplocos moaensis* Borhidi – eastern Cuba
- Symplocos ovalis* C.Wright ex Griseb. – western Cuba
- Symplocos salicifolia* Griseb.

== Talinaceae ==
- Talinum fruticosum (L.) Juss.
- Talinum paniculatum (Jacq.) Gaertn.

== Tapisciaceae ==
- Huertea cubensis Griseb.

== Tetrachondraceae ==
- Polypremum procumbens L.

== Theaceae ==
- Gordonia angustifolia* (Britton & P.Wilson) H.Keng
- Gordonia benitoensis* (Britton & P.Wilson) H.Keng
- Gordonia cristalensis* (Borhidi & O.Muñiz) Greuter & R.Rankin
- Gordonia curtyana* A.Rich.) H.Keng
- Gordonia ekmanii* (O.C.Schmidt) H.Keng
- Gordonia moaensis* (Vict.) H.Keng – eastern Cuba
- Gordonia urbani* (O.C.Schmidt) H.Keng
- Gordonia wrightii* (Griseb.) H.Keng

== Thymelaeaceae ==
- Daphnopsis alainii* Nevling – central Cuba
- Daphnopsis americana (Mill.) J.R.Johnst.
- Daphnopsis angustifolia* C.Wright ex Griseb. – eastern Cuba
- † Daphnopsis bissei* A.Noa – Camagüey
- Daphnopsis calcicola* Ekman ex Urb. – western Cuba
- Daphnopsis cuneata* Radlk. – eastern Cuba
- Daphnopsis guacacoa* C.Wright ex Griseb. – western Cuba
- Daphnopsis oblongifolia* Britton & P.Wilson – central Cuba
- Daphnopsis punctulata* Urb. – southeastern Cuba
- Lagetta valenzuelana* A.Rich.
- Lagetta wrightiana* Krug & Urb.
- Linodendron* Griseb.
  - Linodendron aronifolium* Griseb.
  - Linodendron cubanum* (A.Rich.) Griseb.
  - Linodendron venosum* Griseb.

== Typhaceae ==
- Typha domingensis Pers.

== Ulmaceae ==
- Ampelocera cubensis Griseb. – Cuba and Hispaniola
- Phyllostylon rhamnoides (J.Poiss.) Taub.

== Urticaceae ==
- Boehmeria cylindrica (L.) Sw.
- Boehmeria repens (Griseb.) Wedd.
- Cecropia schreberiana Miq.
- Gyrotaenia myriocarpa Griseb. – Cuba and Hispaniola
- Laportea aestuans (L.) Chew
- Laportea cuneata (A.Rich.) Chew – Cuba and Hispaniola
- Parietaria floridana Nutt.
- Phenax asper* Wedd.
- Phenax microphyllus* Urb.
- Pilea abbreviata* Urb. & Ekman
- Pilea acunae* Grudz.
- Pilea affinis* C.V.Morton
- Pilea ambecarpa* Urb.
- Pilea bissei* Grudz.
- Pilea buchenavii* Urb.
- Pilea bullata* Britton
- Pilea cacuminum* Urb. & Ekman
- Pilea carnosa* Britton
- Pilea cellulosa (Spreng.) Urb. – Cuba and Hispaniola
- Pilea clarana* Urb.
- Pilea clementis* Britton
- Pilea confusa* C.V.Morton
- Pilea cowellii* Britton
- Pilea crenata* Britton & P.Wilson
- Pilea cubensis* Wedd.
- Pilea depressa (Sw.) Blume – Cuba and Hispaniola
- Pilea ermitensis* Britton
- Pilea floridana* Urb.
- Pilea forsythiana* Wedd. – Cuba and Leeward and Windward Islands
- Pilea fruticulosa* C.V.Morton
- Pilea gesnerioides* Grudz.
- Pilea glomerata* Griseb.
- Pilea gnidioides* Griseb.
- Pilea granmae* Grudz.
- Pilea guirana* Urb.
- Pilea hemisphaerica* Urb. & Ekman
- Pilea herniarioides (Sw.) Lindl.
- Pilea heteroneura* Griseb.
- Pilea intermedia* (Wedd.) Urb.
- Pilea laciniata* Urb.
- Pilea libanensis* Urb.
- Pilea loeseneri* Urb. & Ekman
- Pilea lurida C.Wright – Cuba and Hispaniola
- Pilea margarettae Britton – Cuba, Puerto Rico, and Leeward Islands
- Pilea mayarensis* C.V.Morton
- Pilea micromeriifolia Britton & P.Wilson – Cuba and Hispaniola
- Pilea microphylla (L.) Liebm.
- Pilea minguetii Urb. – Cuba and Hispaniola
- Pilea neglecta Britton
- Pilea nipensis Urb. – eastern Cuba
- Pilea nudicaulis (Sw.) Wedd. – Cuba and Jamaica
- Pilea nummulariifolia (Sw.) Wedd.
- Pilea obscura* C.V.Morton
- Pilea obtusangula* Urb.
- Pilea ophiticola* Borhidi
- Pilea orientalis* C.V.Morton
- Pilea ovalifolia* Britton & P.Wilson
- Pilea parciflora* Urb.
- Pilea parietaria (L.) Blume
- Pilea pedroi* Grudz.
- Pilea peladerosi* Grudz.
- Pilea phaeocarpa* Urb.
- Pilea pubescens Liebm.
- Pilea pulchra* C.V.Morton
- Pilea pumileoides* Urb.
- Pilea radiculosa Urb. – Cuba and Haiti
- Pilea rotundata Griseb. – Cuba and Jamaica
  - Pilea rotundata var. filipes* Griseb.
- Pilea sevillensis* Britton
- Pilea shaferi* Britton & P.Wilson ex León & Alain
- Pilea siguaneana* Britton
- Pilea simplex* Urb.
- Pilea spathulata* Griseb.
- Pilea striata* Urb.
- Pilea subintegerrima* (Griseb.) Greuter & R.Rankin
- Pilea sumideroensis* Britton
- Pilea tenerrima Miq.
- Pilea uninervis* Griseb.
- Pilea valenzuelae* Urb.
- Pilea wrightiana* Wedd.
- Pilea yarensis* Britton & P.Wilson
- Rousselia cubensis* Grudz.
- Rousselia humilis (Sw.) Urb.
- Rousselia impariflora* Grudz.
- Urera baccifera (L.) Gaudich. ex Wedd.

== Verbenaceae ==
- Bouchea prismatica (L.) Kuntze
- Citharexylum caudatum L.
- Citharexylum discolor Turcz. – Cuba and Hispaniola
- Citharexylum ekmanii* Moldenke
- Citharexylum × leonis* Moldenke (C. caudatum × C. tristachyum)
- Citharexylum matheanum Borhidi & Kereszty
- Citharexylum spinosum L.
- Citharexylum tristachyum Turcz. – Cuba and Jamaica
- Diphyllocalyx* (Griseb.) Greuter & R.Rankin
  - Diphyllocalyx armatus* (Urb.) Greuter & R.Rankin – southeastern Cuba (Santiago de Cuba International Airport)
  - Diphyllocalyx cayensis* (Britton) Greuter & R.Rankin – eastern and central Cuba
  - Diphyllocalyx galanus* Greuter & R.Rankin – Holguín
  - Diphyllocalyx myrtifolius* (Griseb.) Greuter & R.Rankin – eastern Cuba (Guantánamo: Monte Toro)
  - Diphyllocalyx nipensis* (Urb.) Greuter & R.Rankin – eastern Cuba
  - Diphyllocalyx urquiolae* Greuter & R.Rankin – western Cuba
- Duranta arida Britton & P.Wilson
- Duranta erecta L.
- Lantana angustifolia Mill. – Cuba and Jamaica
- Lantana × bahamensis Britton (L. camara subsp. camara × L. splendens)
- Lantana buchii Urb. – Cuba and Hispaniola
- Lantana camara L.
  - Lantana camara subsp. moldenkei (R.W.Sanders) R.W.Sanders – eastern Cuba and Hispaniola
- Lantana canescens Kunth
- Lantana elenievskii* I.E.Méndez – eastern Cuba (Guantánamo)
- Lantana exarata Urb. & Ekman – Cuba, Hispaniola, and Puerto Rico
- Lantana × flava Medik. – Cuba, Bahamas, Hispaniola, Jamaica, Leeward Islands, and Puerto Rico
- Lantana horrida Kunth
- Lantana insularis Moldenke – Cuba and Jamaica
- Lantana involucrata L.
- Lantana reticulata Pers.
- Lantana scabrida Aiton
- Lantana splendens Medik. – Cuba and Bahamas
- Lantana strigosa (Griseb.) Urb. – western Cuba and Puerto Rico
- Lantana trifolia L.
- Lippia acuminata C.Wright ex Griseb. – central Cuba
- Lippia alba (Mill.) N.E.Br. ex Britton & P.Wilson
- Lippia dulcis Trevir. (synonym Phyla dulcis (Trevir.) Moldenke)
- Lippia micromera Schauer
- Lippia stoechadifolia (L.) Kunth
- Petrea volubilis L.
- Phyla betulifolia (Kunth) Greene
- Phyla nodiflora (L.) Greene
- Priva lappulacea (L.) Pers.
- Stachytarpheta × adulterina Urb. & Ekman (S. jamaicensis × S. mutabilis) – Cuba, Haiti, and Jamaica
- Stachytarpheta cayennensis (Rich.) Vahl
- Stachytarpheta fruticosa (Millsp.) B.L.Rob. – Cuba, Bahamas, and Turks & Caicos
- Stachytarpheta indica (L.) Vahl
- Stachytarpheta jamaicensis (L.) Vahl
- Stachytarpheta mutabilis (Jacq.) Vahl
- Stachytarpheta subincisa* Turcz. – eastern Cuba
- Tamonea curassavica (L.) Pers.
- Tamonea subbiflora Urb. & Ekman – eastern Cuba and Haiti
- Verbena scabra Vahl

== Viburnaceae ==
- Viburnum corymbosum* Urb.
- Viburnum cubense* Urb.
- Viburnum villosum* Sw.

== Violaceae ==
- Hybanthus havanensis Jacq. – Cuba and Hispaniola
- Hybanthus lineatus* (Ortega) M.Gómez
- Hybanthus procumbens* (Griseb.) M.Gómez
- Hybanthus urbanianus* Melch.
- Pombalia linearifolia (Vahl) Paula-Souza – Cuba, Hispaniola, Leeward Islands, and Puerto Rico
- Pombalia wrightii* (Urb.) H.E.Ballard & Paula-Souza

== Vitaceae ==
- Ampelocissus robinsonii Planch. – Cuba, Cayman Islands, Hispaniola, and Jamaica
- Cissus gossypiifolia Standl. – western Cuba, Central America, Colombia, and southern Mexico
- Cissus intermedia A.Rich. – Cuba, Bahamas, Cayman Islands, Hispaniola, and Turks & Caicos
- Cissus microcarpa Vahl
- Cissus obovata Vahl
- Cissus trifoliata (L.) L.
- Cissus verticillata (L.) Nicolson & C.E.Jarvis
- Cissus wrightiana Planch. – Cuba, Cayman Islands, and Hispaniola
- Parthenocissus quinquefolia (L.) Planch.
- Vitis tiliifolia Humb. & Bonpl. ex Schult.

== Xyridaceae ==
- Xyris ambigua Beyr. ex Kunth
- Xyris baldwiniana Schult.
- Xyris bicarinata* Griseb. – western Cuba incl. I. de la Juventud
- Xyris bissei* Urquiola & Kral
- Xyris brevifolia Michx.
- Xyris caroliniana Walter
- Xyris curassavica* Kral & Urquiola – I. de la Juventud
- Xyris ekmanii* Malme – western Cuba
- Xyris elliottii Chapm.
- Xyris flabelliformis Chapm.
- Xyris grandiceps* Griseb. – western Cuba incl. I. de la Juventud
- Xyris jupicai Rich.
- Xyris longibracteata* Britton & P.Wilson – I. de la Juventud
- Xyris mantuensis* Urquiola & Kral
- Xyris navicularis Griseb.
- Xyris paleacea* Kral & Urquiola
- Xyris smalliana Nash

== Zamiaceae ==
- Microcycas* (Miq.) A.DC.
  - Microcycas calocoma* (Miq.) A.DC. – western Cuba
- Zamia angustifolia Jacq. – eastern Cuba and Bahamas
- Zamia erosa O.F.Cook & G.N.Collins – Cuba, western Jamaica, and Puerto Rico
- Zamia integrifolia L.f.
- Zamia pumila L. – Cuba, Dominican Republic, Jamaica, and Puerto Rico
- Zamia pygmaea* Sims – western Cuba incl. I. de la Juventud
- Zamia stricta* Miq. – eastern Cuba

== Zingiberaceae ==
- Renealmia aromatica (Aubl.) Griseb.
- Renealmia jamaicensis (Gaertn.) Horan. – Cuba, Bahamas, Hispaniola, Jamaica, and Puerto Rico

== Zygophyllaceae ==
- Guaiacum officinale L.
- Guaiacum sanctum L.
- Kallstroemia maxima (L.) Hook. & Arn.

== See also ==
- Cuban cactus scrub
- Cuban dry forests
- Cuban moist forests
- Cuban pine forests

== Bibliography ==
- Grisebach, August (1866). Catalogus plantarum cubensium (Catalog of Plants of Cuba). Engelmann, Leipzig. (available at Botanicus.org)
- Grisebach, A.[H.R.] 1862. Plantæ Wrightianæ e Cuba orientali, Pars II. (Monopetalae et Monocotyledones). Mem. Amer. Acad. Arts, ser .2, 8: 503–536.
- Howard, R.A. 1988. Charles Wright in Cuba, 1856–1867. Chadwyck-Healey, Alexandria.
- León, H. (J. S. Sauget) & Alain, H. (E. E. Liogier) 1946-62 (4 volumes); suppl. 1969.Flora de Cuba. 5 Volumes. Havana
- Manitz, H. 1987. Pp. 23–24 in: Las collecciones de Charles Wright en Pinar del Río. IV Conferencia sobre la Flora de Cuba. Resúmenes. Machurrucutu-La Habana.
- Oviedo Prieto, R. 1994. Plantae Wrightianae ex insula Cuba quae in herbario Horti Regii Matritensis asservantur. Fontqueria 39: 165–213.
- Richard, A. (1845). Histoire Physique, Politique et Naturelle de L'Ile de Cuba (Editor: Ramón de la Sagra). Botanique. Plantes Vasculaires. (Physical, Political and Natural History of the island of Cuba, Botany. Vascular plants)(available at Gallica)
- Sauvalle, F.A. 1870. Flora cubana. Anales Acad. Ci. Méd. Habana 7.
- Urban, I. 1902. Symbolae Antillanae, 3. Bornträger, Leipzig. (reprinted 1964, Asher Amsterdam)
