= Harrisia =

Harrisia is the name of two genera of life forms:

- Harrisia (plant): a genus of cacti
- Harrisia (fly): a genus of fly
