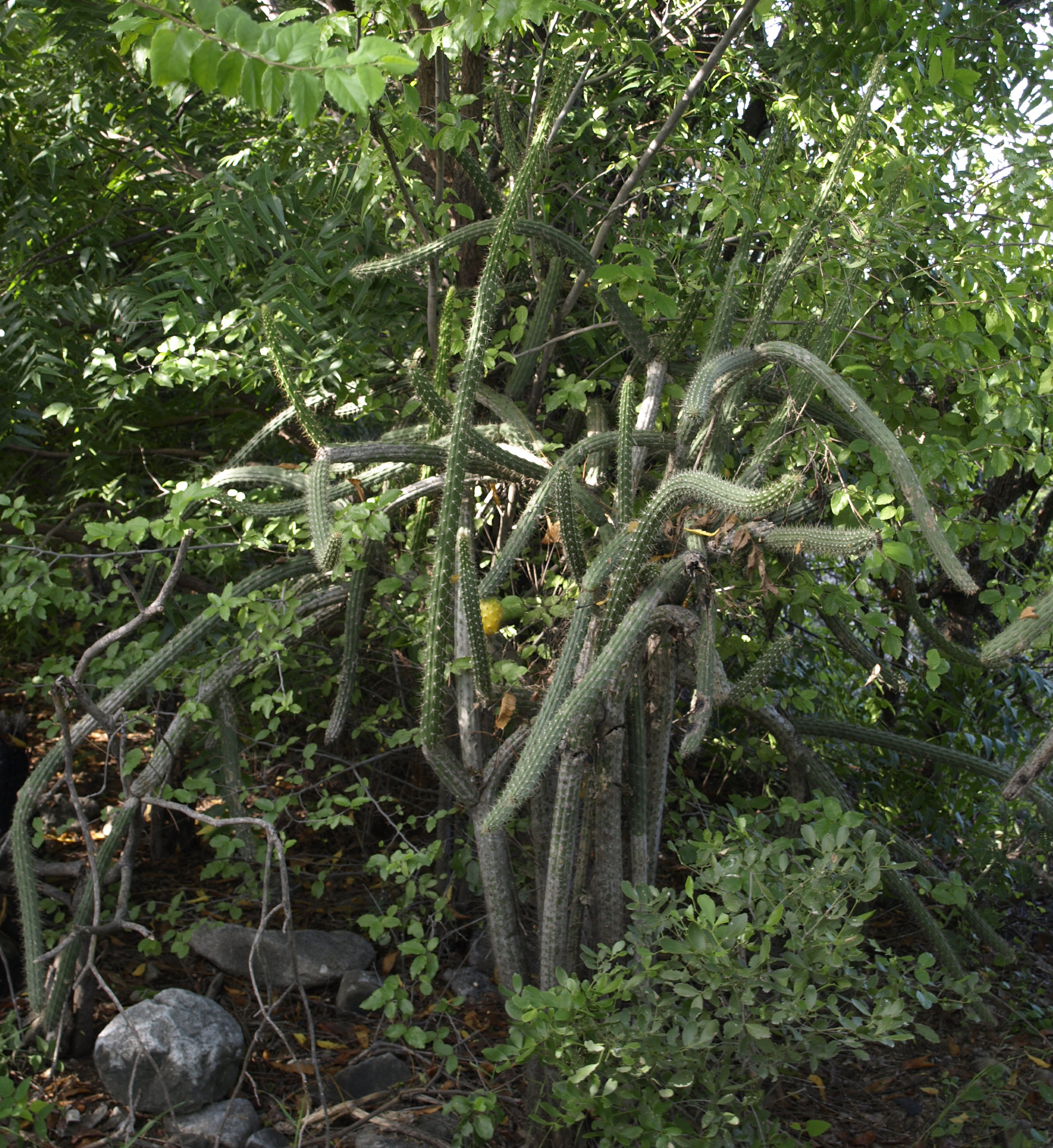

Scientific classification
- Kingdom: Plantae
- Clade: Tracheophytes
- Clade: Angiosperms
- Clade: Eudicots
- Order: Caryophyllales
- Family: Cactaceae
- Subfamily: Cactoideae
- Genus: Harrisia
- Species: H. divaricata

Binomial name
- Harrisia divaricata (Lam.) Lourteig

Synonyms
- Cactus divaricatus Lam. 1785; Cereus divaricatus (Lam.) DC. 1828; Pilocereus divaricatus (Lam.) Lem. 1862; Cephalocereus hermentianus (Monv. ex Lem.) Britton & Rose 1909; Cereus divergens Pfeiff. 1837; Cereus fimbriatus Pfeiff. 1837; Cereus hermentianus Monv. ex Lem. 1859; Cereus nashii (Britton) Vaupel 1913; Harrisia nashii Britton 1908 publ. 1909; Harrisia nashii var. straminea W.T.Marshall 1943; Pilocereus albispinus Salm-Dyck ex C.F.Först. & Rümpler 1885; Pilocereus hermentianus (Monv. ex Lem.) Lem. 1868; Pilosocereus hermentianus (Monv. ex Lem.) Byles & G.D.Rowley 1957; Serrulatocereus serruliflorus (Haw.) Guiggi 2017

= Harrisia divaricata =

Species of cactus

Harrisia divaricata is a species of cactus endemic to Hispaniola.

== Description ==
Harrisia divaricata grows as a shrub up to 1 meter tall with upright, richly branched, slender shoots. There are nine blunt ribs. The four brown central spines are 2 to 2.5 centimeters long. The eight to ten marginal spines are white.

The flowers are large and the globose spherical fruits are yellow. Seeds are 1.4–1.65 × 2.05 –2.6 mm.

== Distribution ==
Harrisia divaricata is widespread on Hispaniola growing in scrublands and scrub forest at 5-400 meters.

== Taxonomy ==
The first description as Cactus divaricatus was made in 1785 by Jean-Baptiste de Lamarck. The specific epithet divaricata means 'spread'. Curt Backeberg placed the species in the genus Harrisia in 1960. Further nomenclature synonyms are Cereus divaricatus (Lam.) DC. (1828), Pilocereus divaricatus (Lam.) Lem. (1862) and Harrisia divaricata (Lam.) Lourteig (1991, nom. inval.).
