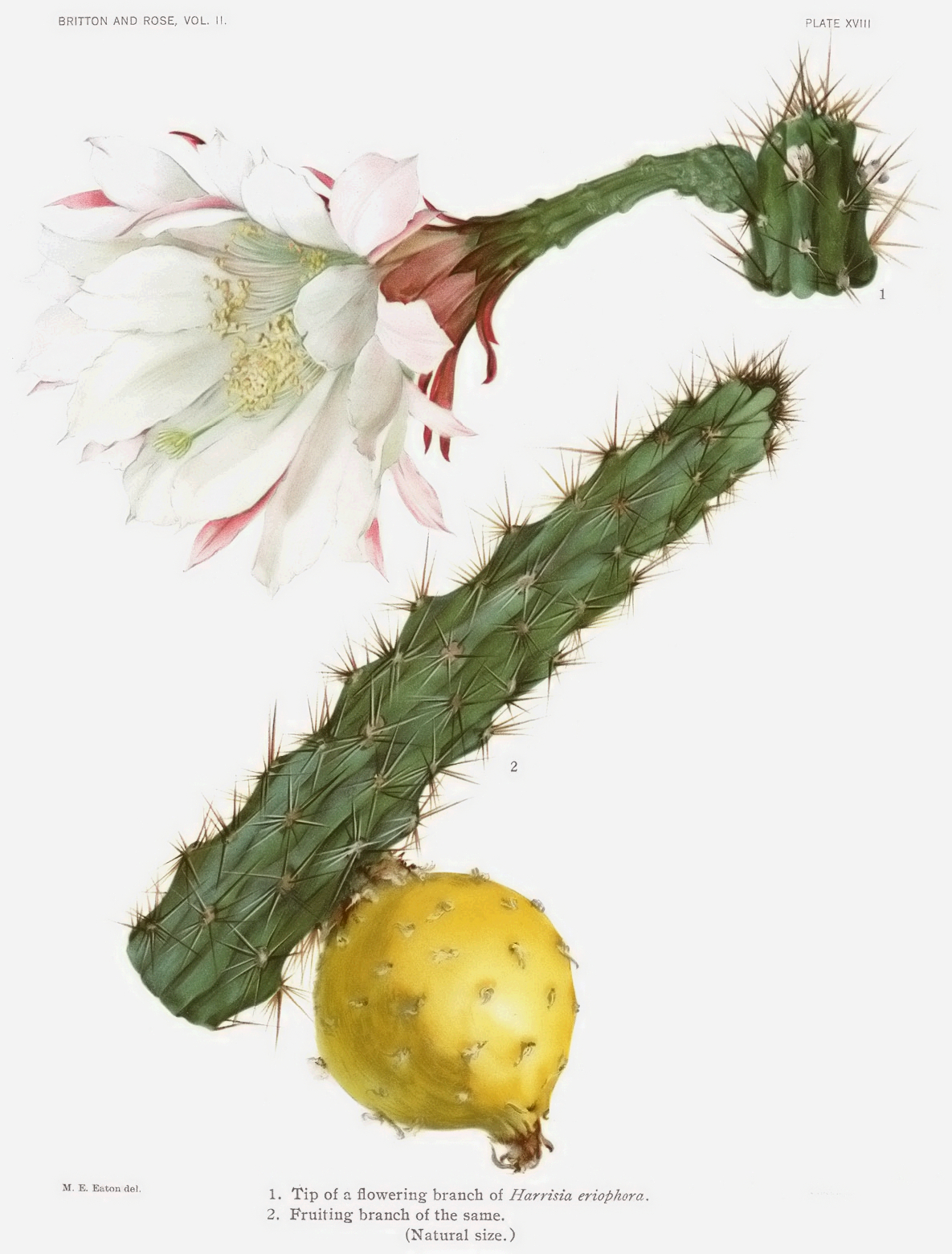

Conservation status
- Least Concern (IUCN 3.1)

Scientific classification
- Kingdom: Plantae
- Clade: Tracheophytes
- Clade: Angiosperms
- Clade: Eudicots
- Order: Caryophyllales
- Family: Cactaceae
- Subfamily: Cactoideae
- Genus: Harrisia
- Species: H. eriophora

Binomial name
- Harrisia eriophora (Pfeiff.) Britton

= Harrisia eriophora =

Species of cactus

Harrisia eriophora is a species of cactus found in Cuba.

== Description ==
Harrisia eriophora grows shrubby and often forms dense groups with upright, arching or spreading shoots with heights of 3 to 5 meters. The initially bright green shoots later become dark green. They have diameters of up to 4 centimeters and more. There are eight to twelve prominent ribs, which are deeply indented between them. The six to 13 needle-like, light brown, gray or yellow spines have a darker tip and are 2 to 4 centimeters long.

The flowers reach a length of 12 to 18 centimeters. Its flower tube is covered with a few scales and long, white hairs. The obovate to spherical, yellow to dull red fruits are edible. They have a diameter of up to 6 centimeters

== Distribution ==
Harrisia eriophora is widespread in the United States in the state of Florida and in Cuba.

== Taxonomy ==
The first description as Cereus eriophorus was made in 1837 by Ludwig Georg Karl Pfeiffer. The specific epithet eriophora means 'wool-bearing'. Nathaniel Lord Britton placed the species in the genus Harrisia in 1909.
