= Harrisia brasiliensis =

Scientific classification
- Kingdom: Animalia
- Phylum: Arthropoda
- Class: Insecta
- Order: Diptera
- Family: Tachinidae
- Subfamily: Exoristinae
- Tribe: Goniini
- Genus: Harrisia
- Species: H. brasiliensis

Binomial name
- Harrisia brasiliensis Robineau-Desvoidy, 1830

Species of fly

Harrisia brasiliensis is a species of fly in the family Tachinidae.

== Distribution ==
Brazil.
