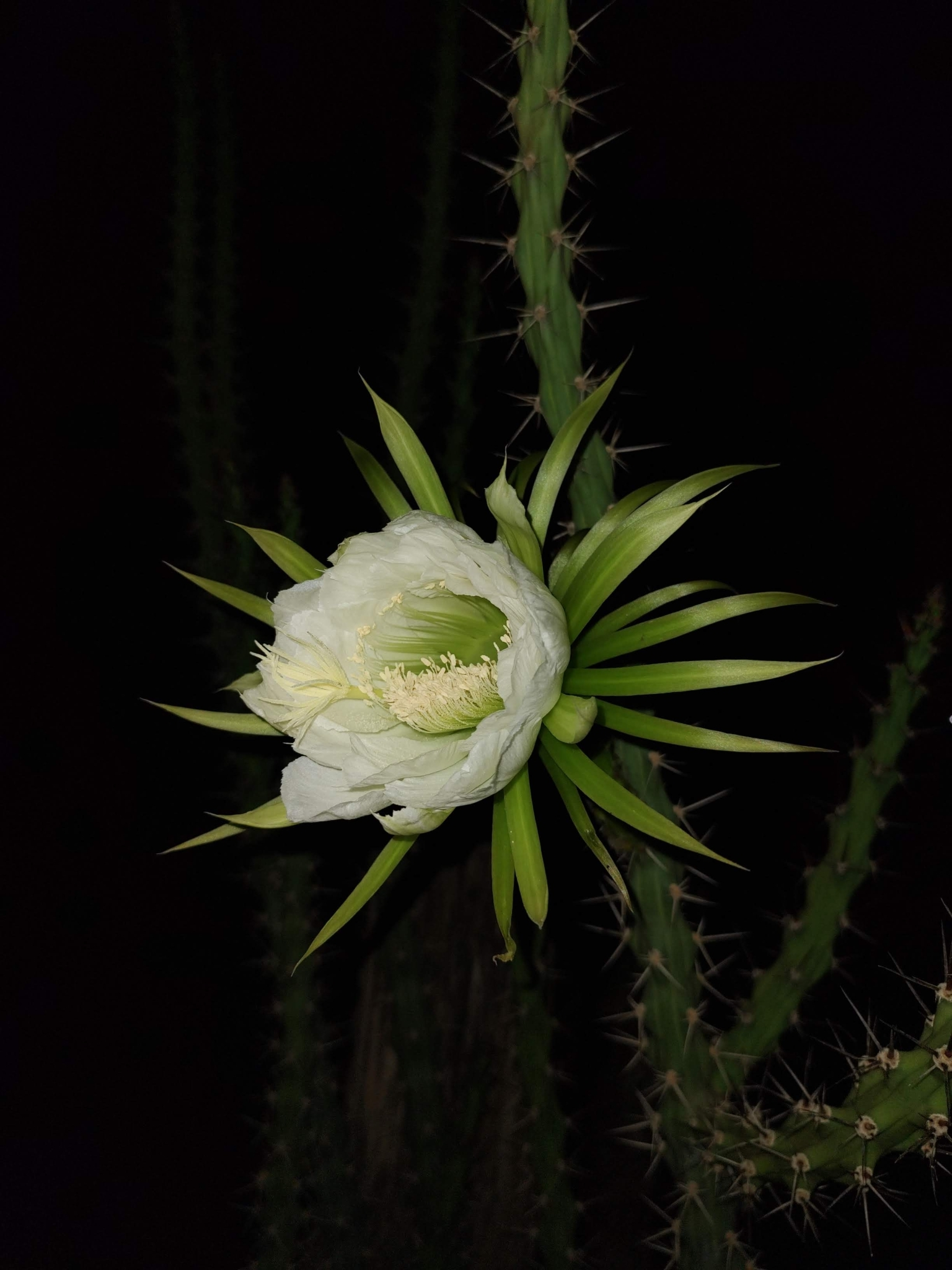

Conservation status
- Least Concern (IUCN 3.1)

Scientific classification
- Kingdom: Plantae
- Clade: Embryophytes
- Clade: Tracheophytes
- Clade: Spermatophytes
- Clade: Angiosperms
- Clade: Eudicots
- Order: Caryophyllales
- Family: Cactaceae
- Subfamily: Cactoideae
- Genus: Harrisia
- Species: H. adscendens

Binomial name
- Harrisia adscendens (Gürke) Britton & Rose

Synonyms
- Cereus adscendens Gürke 1908; Eriocereus adscendens (Gürke) A.Berger 1929; Cereus platygonus Salm-Dyck 1850; Eriocereus platygonus (Salm-Dyck) Riccob. 1909; Harrisia platygona (Salm-Dyck) Britton & Rose 1920

= Harrisia adscendens =

Species of cactus

Harrisia adscendens is a species of cactus found in Brazil.

== Description ==
Harrisia adscendens grows as a shrub with rich, sparsely branched, initially upright, later overhanging or spreading shoots and forms a striking trunk. The shoots have a diameter of 2 to 5 centimeters and are 5 to 8 meters long. There are seven to ten low, rounded ribs that form elongated tubercles. The four to ten strong, yellowish to grayish thorns, thickened at their base, have a darker tip and are 1 to 3 centimeters long.

The flowers reach a length of 15 to 18 centimeters. Its pericarpel and flower tube are covered with scales and long hairs. The spherical, tearing, red fruits are slightly tuberous. They have a diameter of 5 to 6 centimeters.

== Distribution ==
Harrisia adscendens is widespread in northeastern Brazil from the state of Bahia to the south of Ceará and Paraíba at altitudes of 50 to 700 meters.

== Taxonomy ==
The first description as Cereus adscendens was made in 1908 by Max Gürke. The specific epithet adscendens comes from Latin, means 'ascending' and refers to the growth habit of the species. Nathaniel Lord Britton and Joseph Nelson Rose placed the species in the genus Harrisia in 1920. Another nomenclature synonym is Eriocereus adscendens (Gürke) A.Berger (1929).
