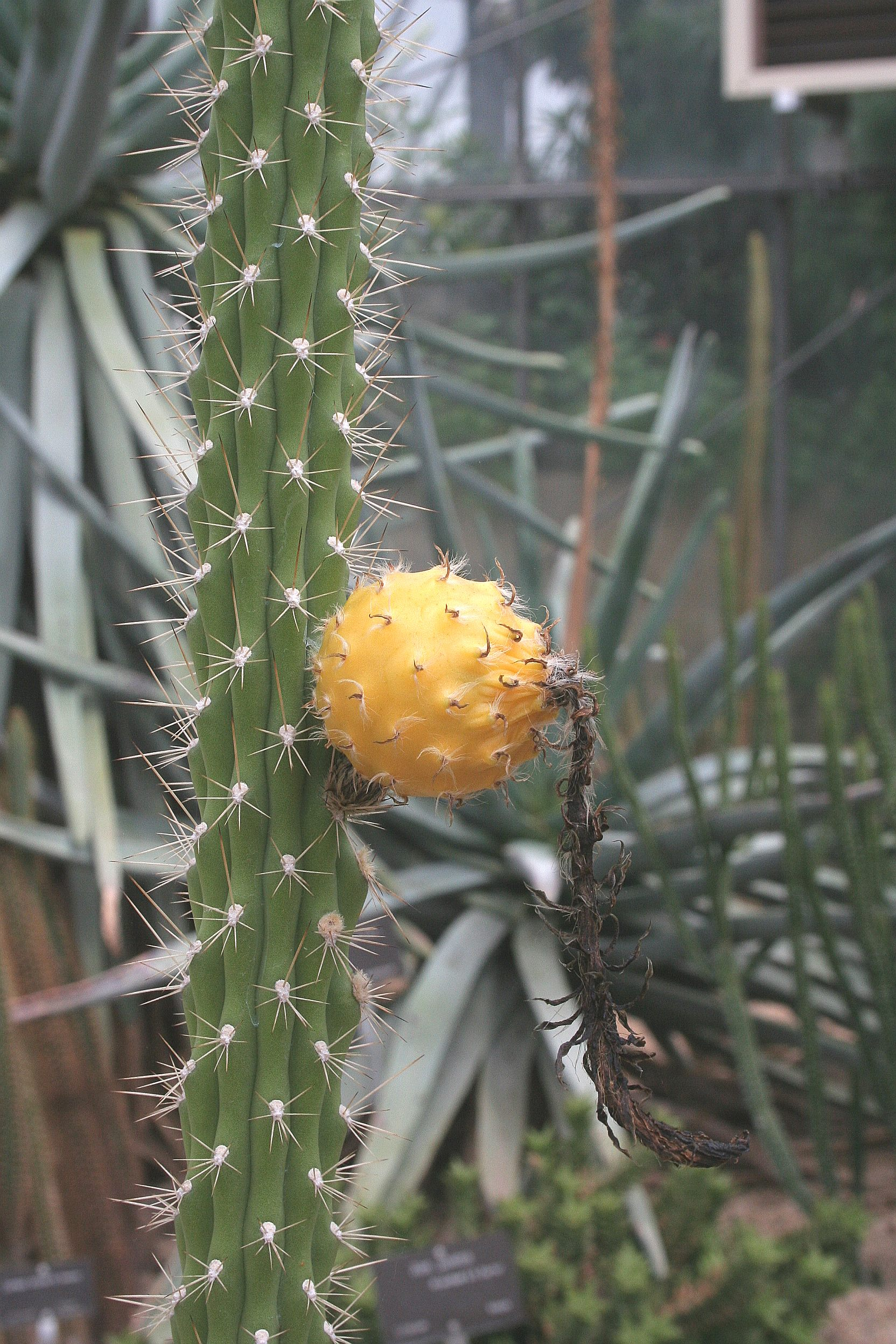

Scientific classification
- Kingdom: Plantae
- Clade: Tracheophytes
- Clade: Angiosperms
- Clade: Eudicots
- Order: Caryophyllales
- Family: Cactaceae
- Subfamily: Cactoideae
- Genus: Harrisia
- Species: H. brookii

Binomial name
- Harrisia brookii Britton

Synonyms
- Cereus brookii (Britton) Vaupel 1913

= Harrisia brookii =

Species of cactus

Harrisia brookii is a species of cactus found in the Bahamas.

== Description ==
Harrisia brookii grows as a shrub with richly branched, light green shoots 3 to 4 centimeters in diameter and reaches heights of up to 5 meters. There are ten distinct, deeply notched ribs. The nine to twelve brown to white thorns are up to 2.5 centimeters long.

The funnel-shaped flowers are around 20 centimeters long. Its floral tube and pericarpel are covered with long, pointed scales. The yellowish, ellipsoid to spherical fruits reach a diameter of up to 8 centimeters. They are covered with low tubercles and perennial scales.

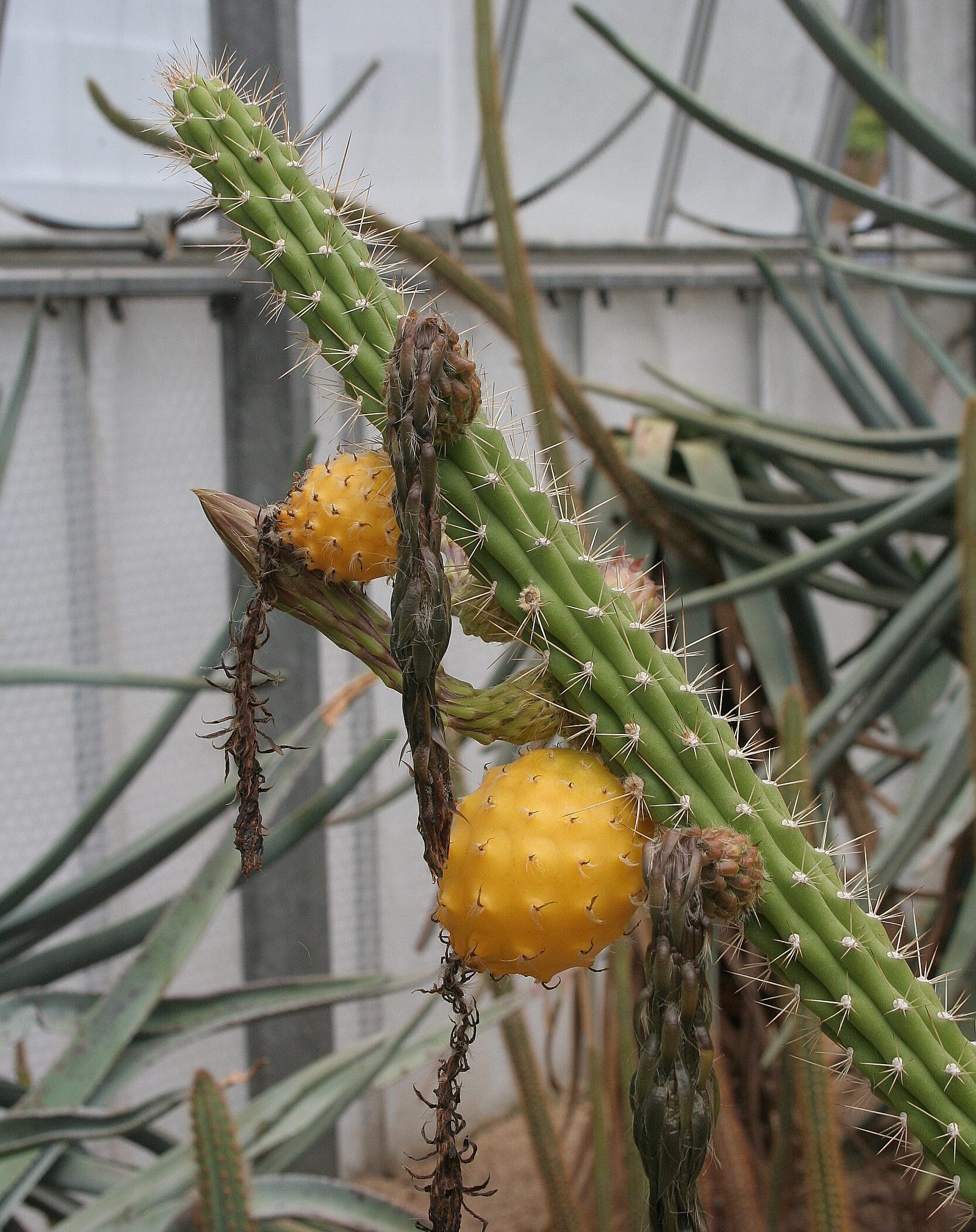

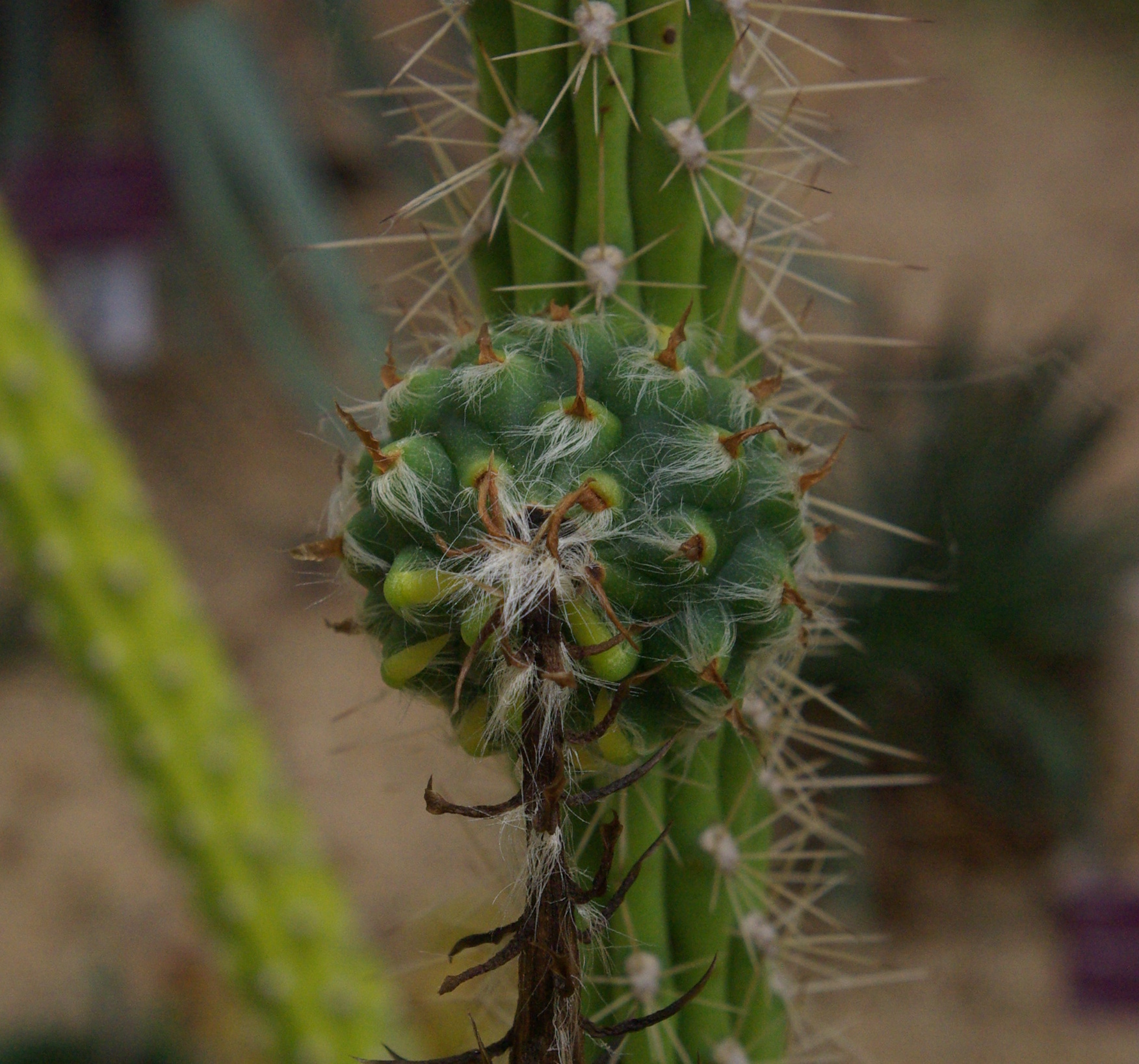

== Distribution ==
Harrisia brookii is common in the Bahamas at elevations of 0–20 meters.

== Taxonomy ==
The first description by Nathaniel Lord Britton was published in 1909. The specific epithet brookii honors the archivist Herbert A. Brooke from the Bahamas. A nomenclature synonym is Cereus brookii (Britton) Vaupel (1913).
