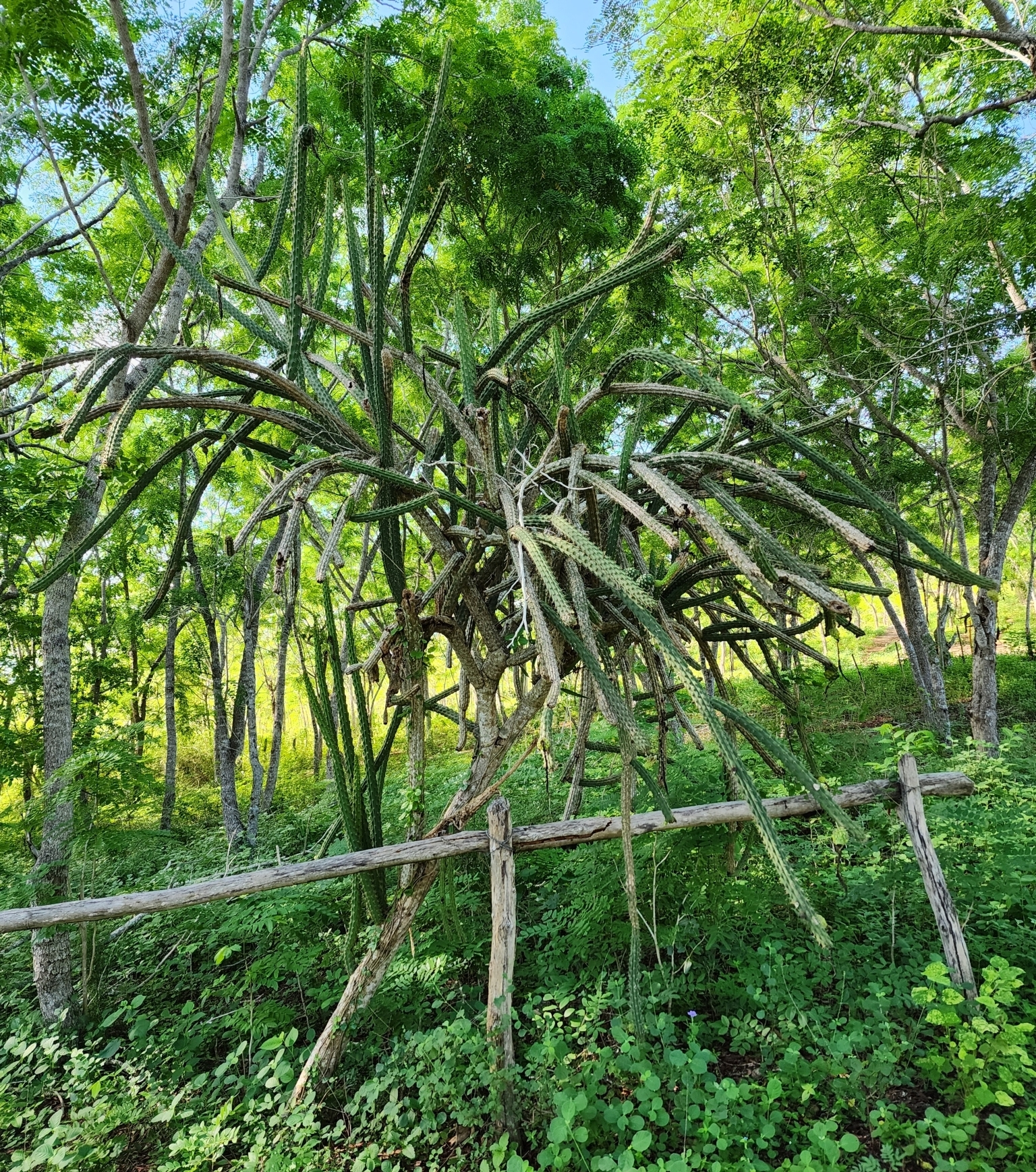

Scientific classification
- Kingdom: Plantae
- Clade: Tracheophytes
- Clade: Angiosperms
- Clade: Eudicots
- Order: Caryophyllales
- Family: Cactaceae
- Subfamily: Cactoideae
- Genus: Harrisia
- Species: H. fernowii

Binomial name
- Harrisia fernowii Britton

= Harrisia fernowii =

Species of cactus

Harrisia fernowii is a species of cactus found in Cuba.

== Description ==
Harrisia fernowii grows with multi-branched, light green shoots up to 2.5 centimeters in diameter and reaches heights of 2.5 to 3 meters. There are nine not very prominent, shallowly notched ribs. The eight to eleven light brown thorns have a darker tip and are up to 6 centimeters long.

The flowers are up to 20 centimeters long. Its floral tube and pericarpel are covered with pointed, 1 to 2 centimeter long scales and tufts of long, brown hairs.

== Distribution ==
Harrisia fernowii is widespread in Cuba.

== Taxonomy ==
The first description by Nathaniel Lord Britton was published in 1909. The specific epithet fernowii honors American forester Bernhard Eduard Fernow (1851–1923).
