= William H. Harris (botanist) =

Irish botanist (1860–1920)

William H. Harris (1860–1920) was a gardener and plant collector from Ireland. He worked in Jamaica.

He was from Enniskillen. He was in charge of King's House Garden in Jamaica and later served as superintendent of public gardens and plantations in Jamaica.The genera Harrisia and Harrisella are named for him.

He collected specimens held by the University of the West Indies' herbarium. He was the first to document various plant species.

He wrote an article on the orchids grown in public gardens in Jamaica.

== See also ==
- British Jamaica
- Linnean Society of London
- William Fawcett (botanist)
- Nathaniel Lord Britton
