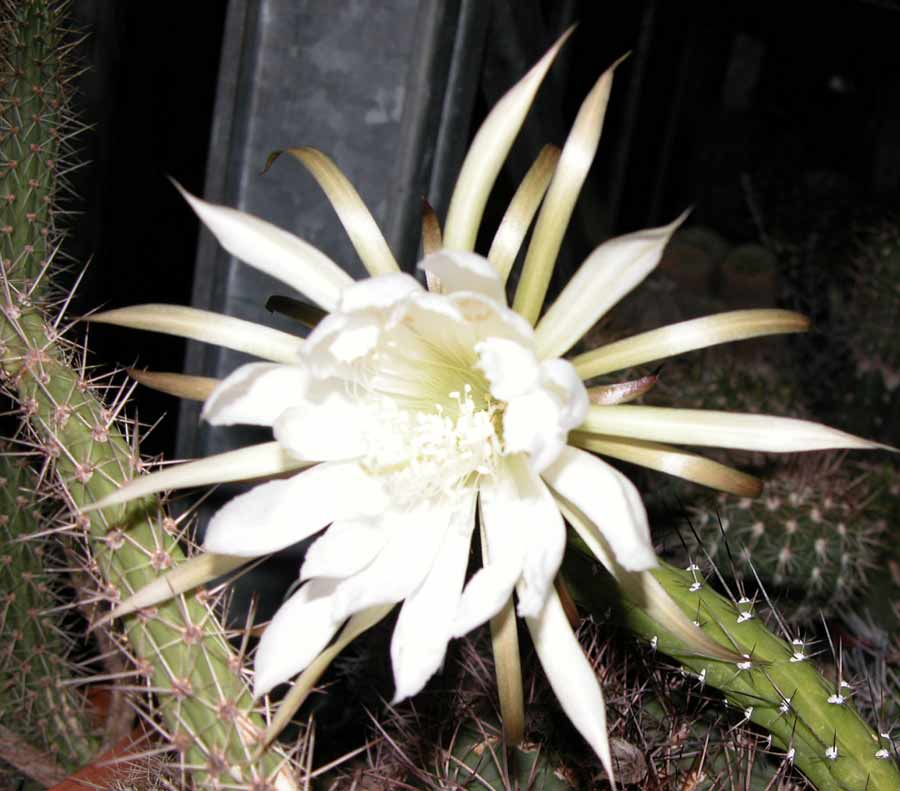

Scientific classification
- Kingdom: Plantae
- Clade: Tracheophytes
- Clade: Angiosperms
- Clade: Eudicots
- Order: Caryophyllales
- Family: Cactaceae
- Subfamily: Cactoideae
- Genus: Harrisia
- Species: H. earlei

Binomial name
- Harrisia earlei Britton & Rose

= Harrisia earlei =

Species of cactus

Harrisia earlei is a species of cactus endemic to Cuba.

== Description ==
Harrisia earlei grows prostrate, shrubby to hanging. The dark green shoots have a diameter of 2 to 6 centimetres (0.8 to 2.4 inches) and are 2 to 3 metres (7 to 10 feet) long. There are five to seven ribs, which are angular on young shoots and almost cylindrical on old shoots. The five to eight needle-like, ascending, initially black thorns later turn gray and are 4 to 5 centimetres (1.6 to 2.0 inches) long.

The flowers reach a length of up to 20 centimetres (8 inches). The yellow, depressed, spherical fruits are initially tuberous and later smooth. They have a diameter of 6 to 7 centimetres (2.4 to 2.8 inches).

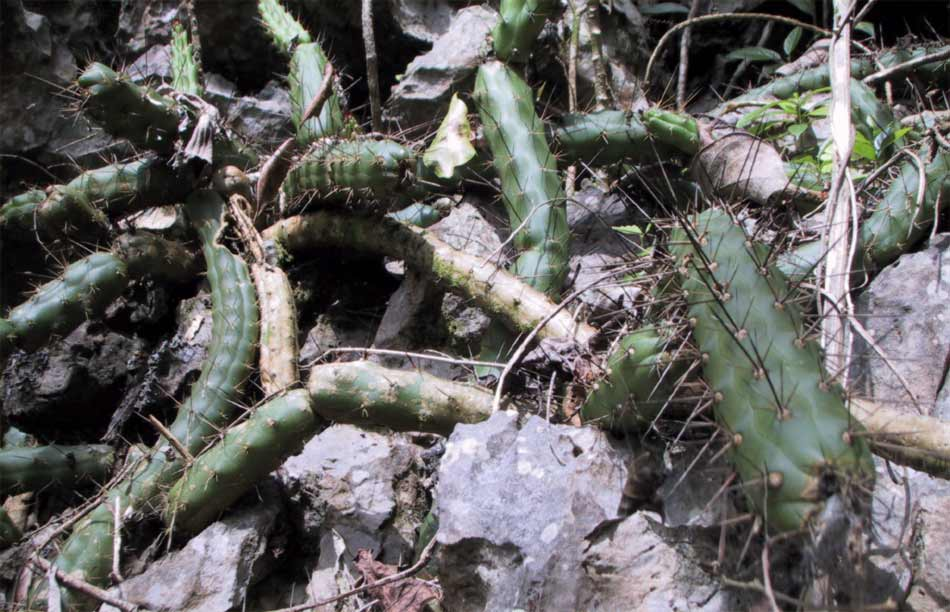

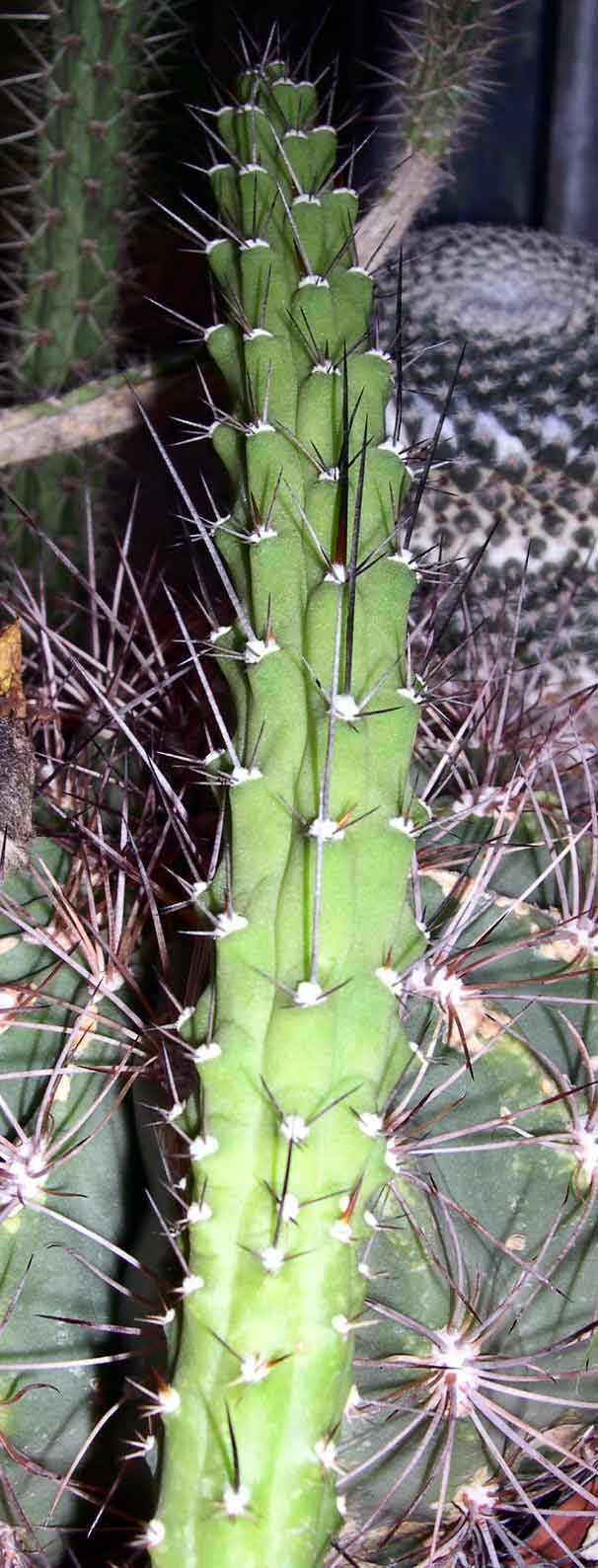

== Distribution ==
Harrisia earlei is widespread in Cuba in the Pinar del Río province on steep limestone cliffs in deciduous bushes at elevations of 100–400 meters.

== Taxonomy ==
The first description was made in 1920 by Nathaniel Lord Britton and Joseph Nelson Rose. The specific epithet earlei honors the American botanist Franklin Sumner Earle (1856–1929).
