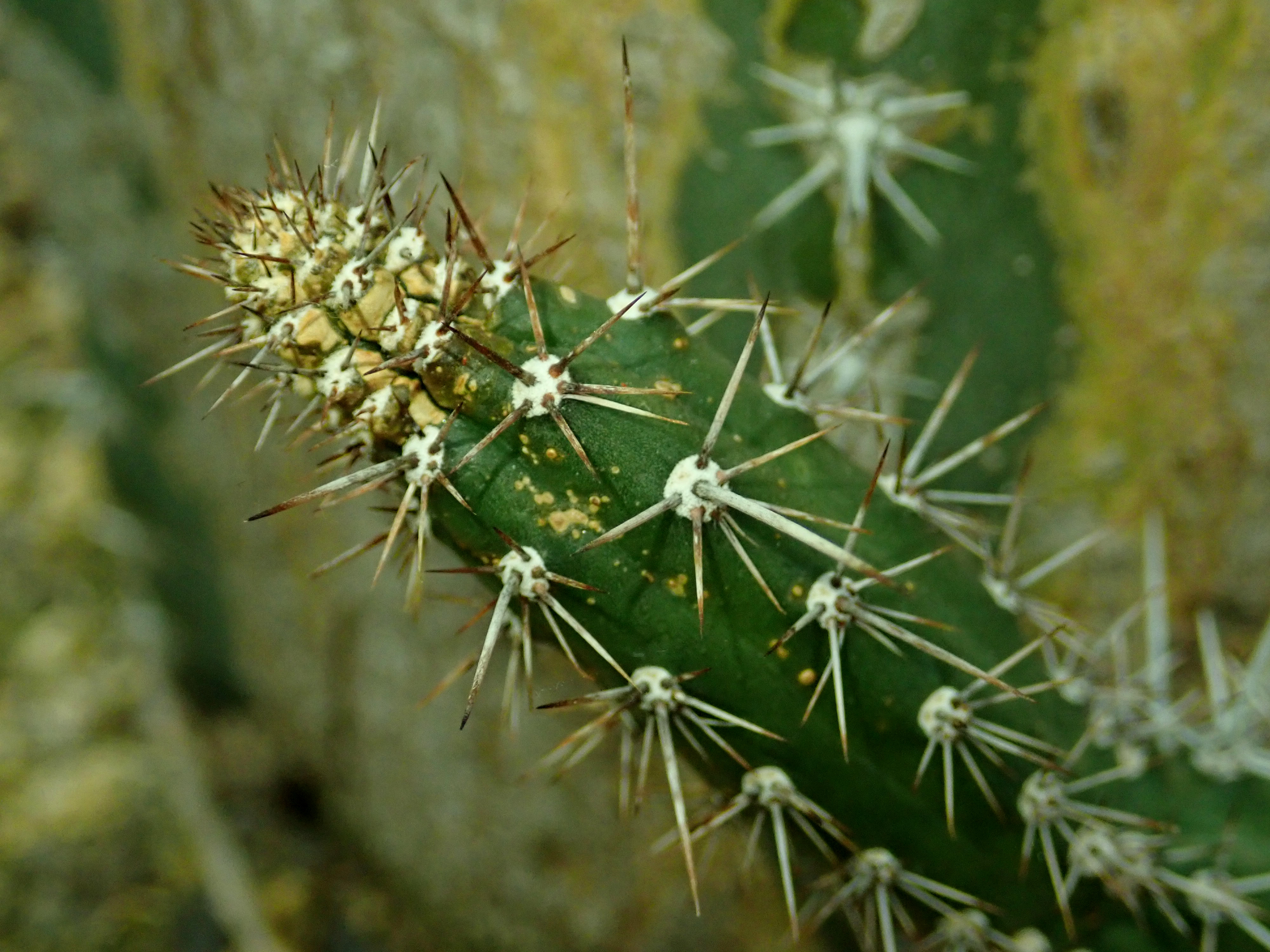

Conservation status
- Least Concern (IUCN 3.1)

Scientific classification
- Kingdom: Plantae
- Clade: Tracheophytes
- Clade: Angiosperms
- Clade: Eudicots
- Order: Caryophyllales
- Family: Cactaceae
- Subfamily: Cactoideae
- Genus: Harrisia
- Species: H. tortuosa

Binomial name
- Harrisia tortuosa (J. Forbes ex Otto & A. Dietr.) Britton & Rose

= Harrisia tortuosa =

Species of cactus

Harrisia tortuosa is a species of cactus in the Trichocereeae tribe.

== Description ==
Harrisia tortuosa grows as a shrub with upright or later arched or prostrate, dark green shoots that are up to 1 meter long with diameters of 2 to 4 centimeters. There are usually seven rounded, slightly tuberous ribs. The one to three strong central thorns, initially red, later become almost black. They are 3 to 4 centimeters long. The six to ten pale and light-colored marginal spines reach a length of up to 2 centimeters.

The flowers reach a length of up to 16 centimeters. The spherical, bumpy red fruits have a few thorns and reach a diameter of 3 to 4 centimeters.

== Distribution ==
It is native to low altitudes in Uruguay, Paraguay, northeastern Argentina at elevations of 80-300 meters.

Harrisia tortuosa is considered an exotic invasive in Australia.

== Taxonomy ==
The first description as Cereus tortuosus was made in 1838 by Christoph Friedrich Otto and Albert Gottfried Dietrich. The specific epithet tortuosa means 'tortuous, abundant with coils'. Nathaniel Lord Britton and Joseph Nelson Rose placed the species in the genus Harrisia in 1920. Another nomenclature synonym is Eriocereus tortuosus (J.Forbes ex Otto & A.Dietr.) Riccob. (1909).
