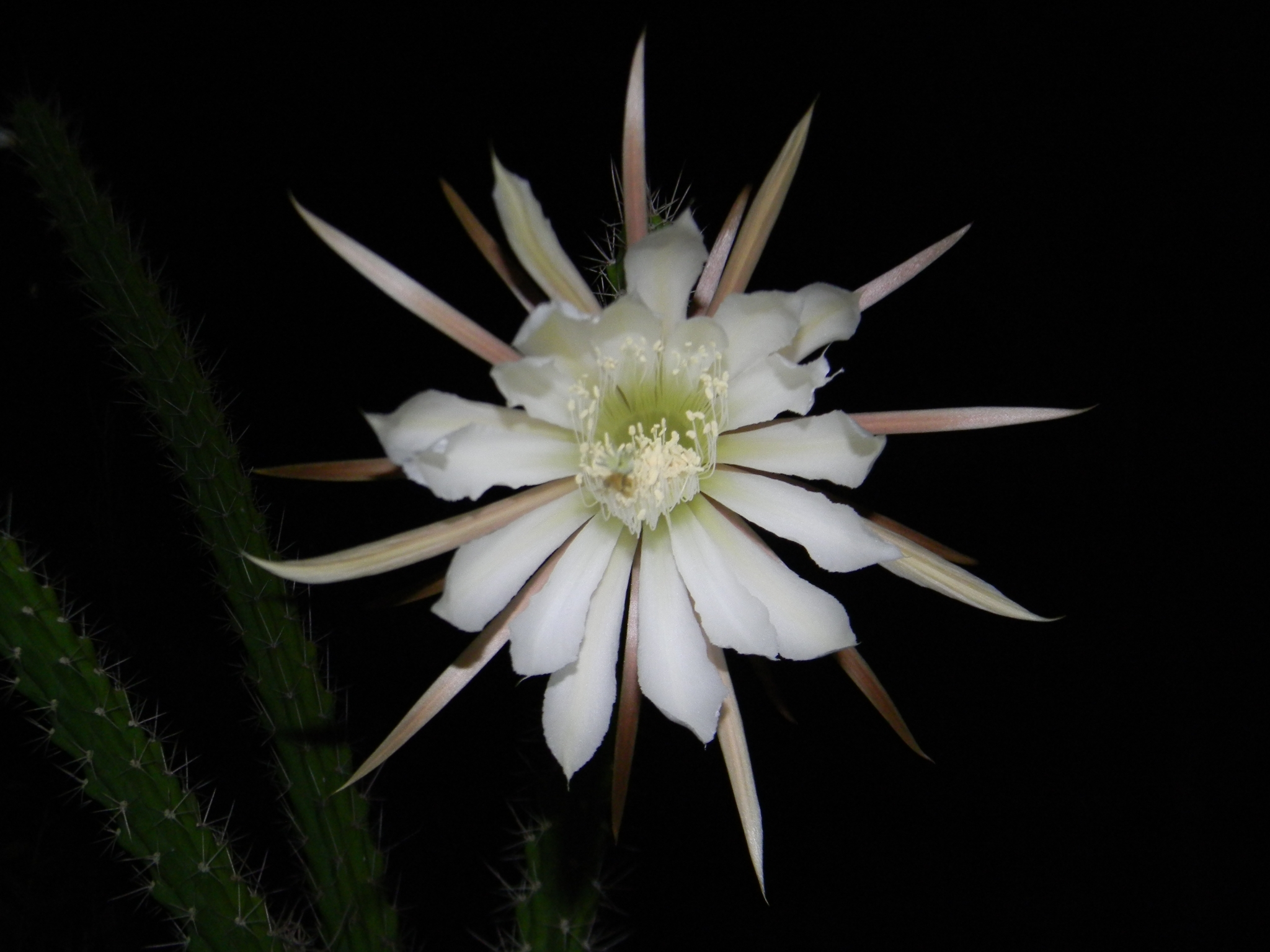

Scientific classification
- Kingdom: Plantae
- Clade: Embryophytes
- Clade: Tracheophytes
- Clade: Spermatophytes
- Clade: Angiosperms
- Clade: Eudicots
- Order: Caryophyllales
- Family: Cactaceae
- Subfamily: Cactoideae
- Genus: Harrisia
- Species: H. taetra

Binomial name
- Harrisia taetra Areces

= Harrisia taetra =

Species of cactus

Harrisia taetra is a species of cactus found in Cuba.

== Description ==
Harrisia taetra grows like a shrub and reaches heights of 1 to 2.5 meters. The somewhat articulated, cylindrical shoots have a diameter of 6.5 to 8 centimeters and are 0.3 to 1 meter long. There are eight to ten ribs. The stiff, needle-like, straight thorns, initially almost black, later turn whitish yellow. The two to three central spines are 4 to 9 centimeters long. The six to nine marginal spines are 0.7 to 4.4 centimeters long.

The flowers reach a length of 16.5 to 20 centimeters and a diameter of 12 to 15 centimeters. The light to golden yellow, broadly ovoid to somewhat spherical fruits are smooth and covered with a few tiny scales. They have a diameter of 3.8 to 7.2 centimeters and reach a length of 3.5 to 7.3 centimeters.

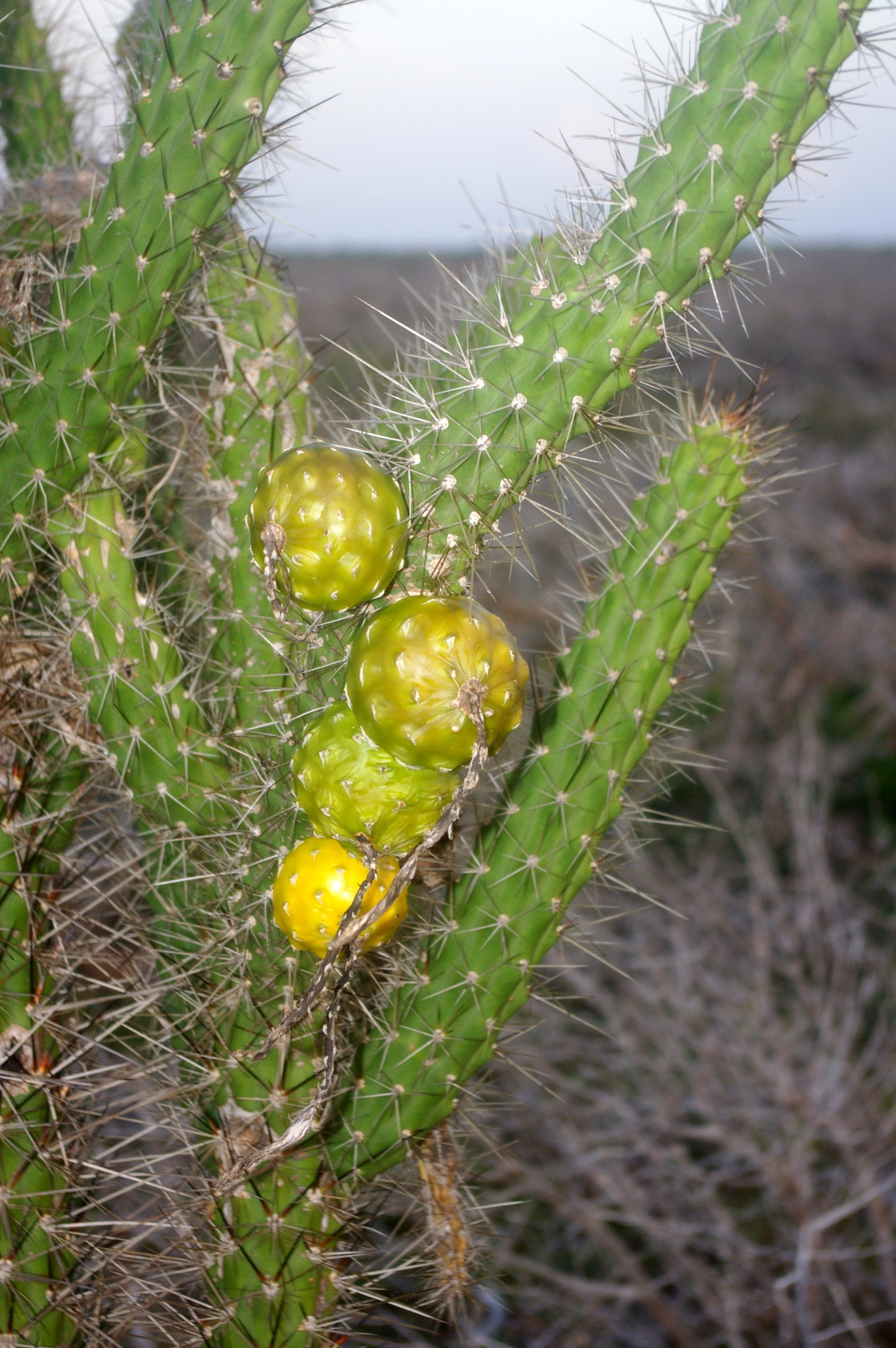
Fruits

== Distribution ==
Harrisia taetra is widespread in Cuba in the Pinar del Río province on the Guanahacabibes Peninsula.

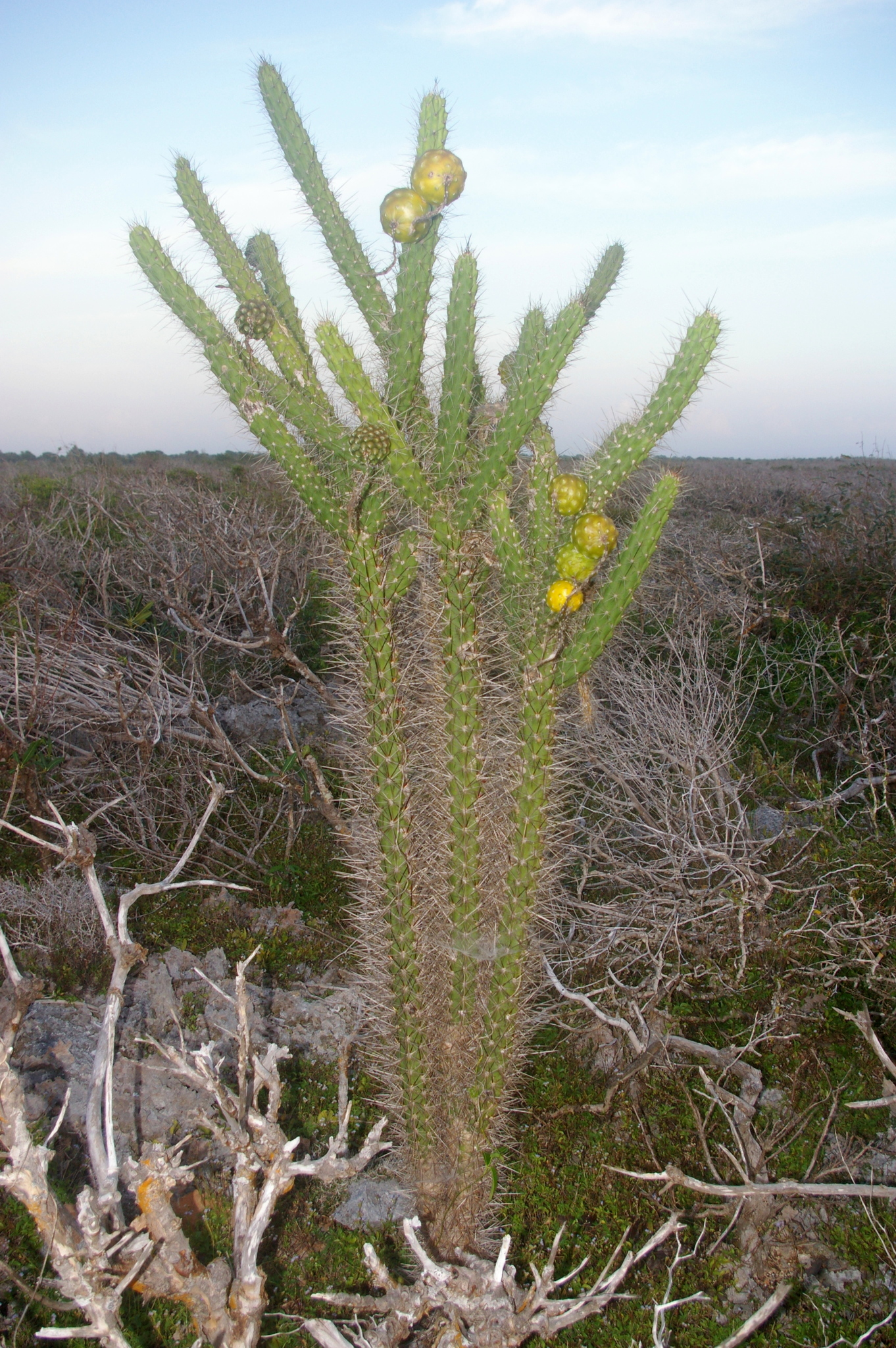
Adult plant in habitat

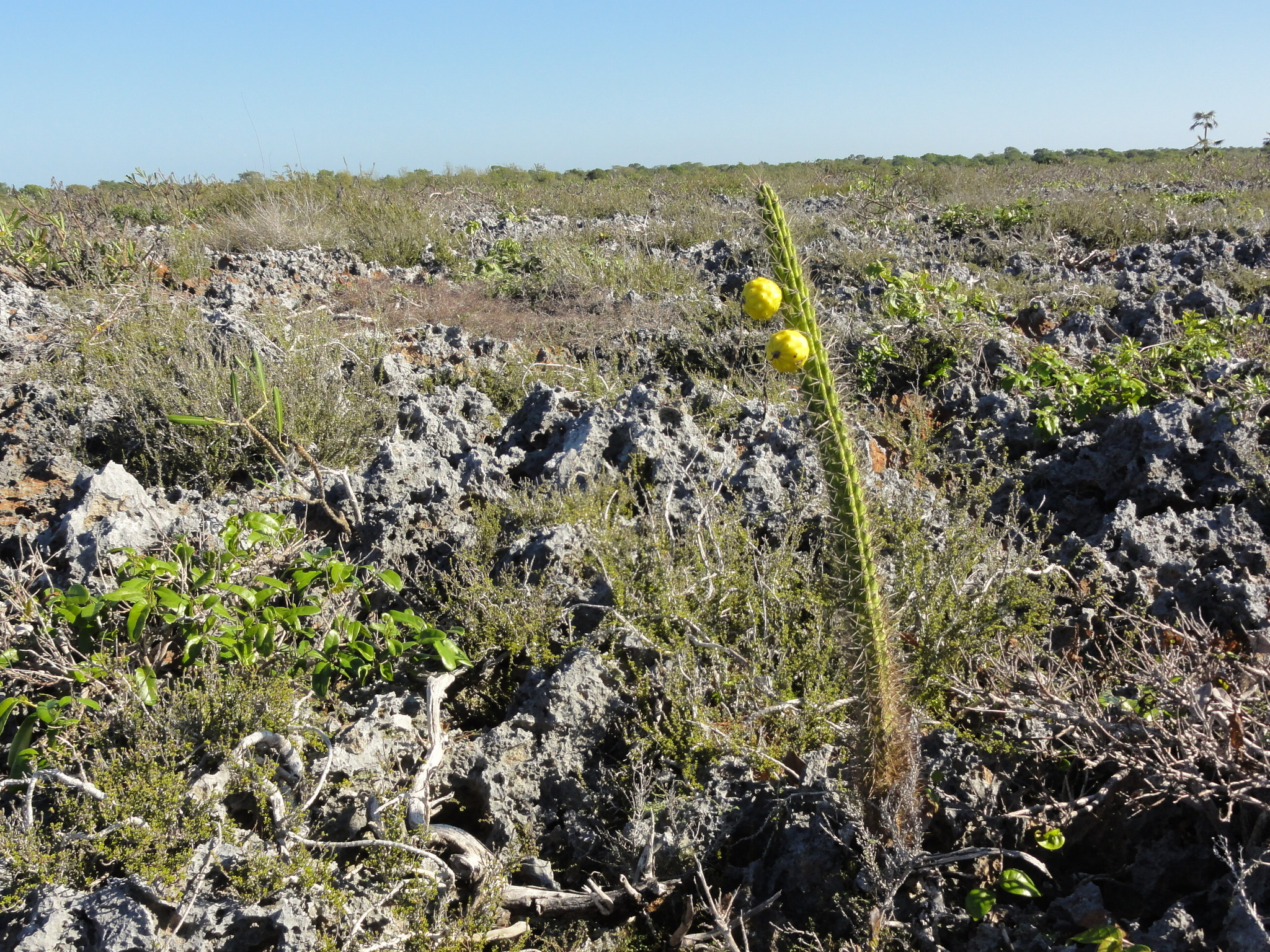
Habitat in Perjuicio, Cuba

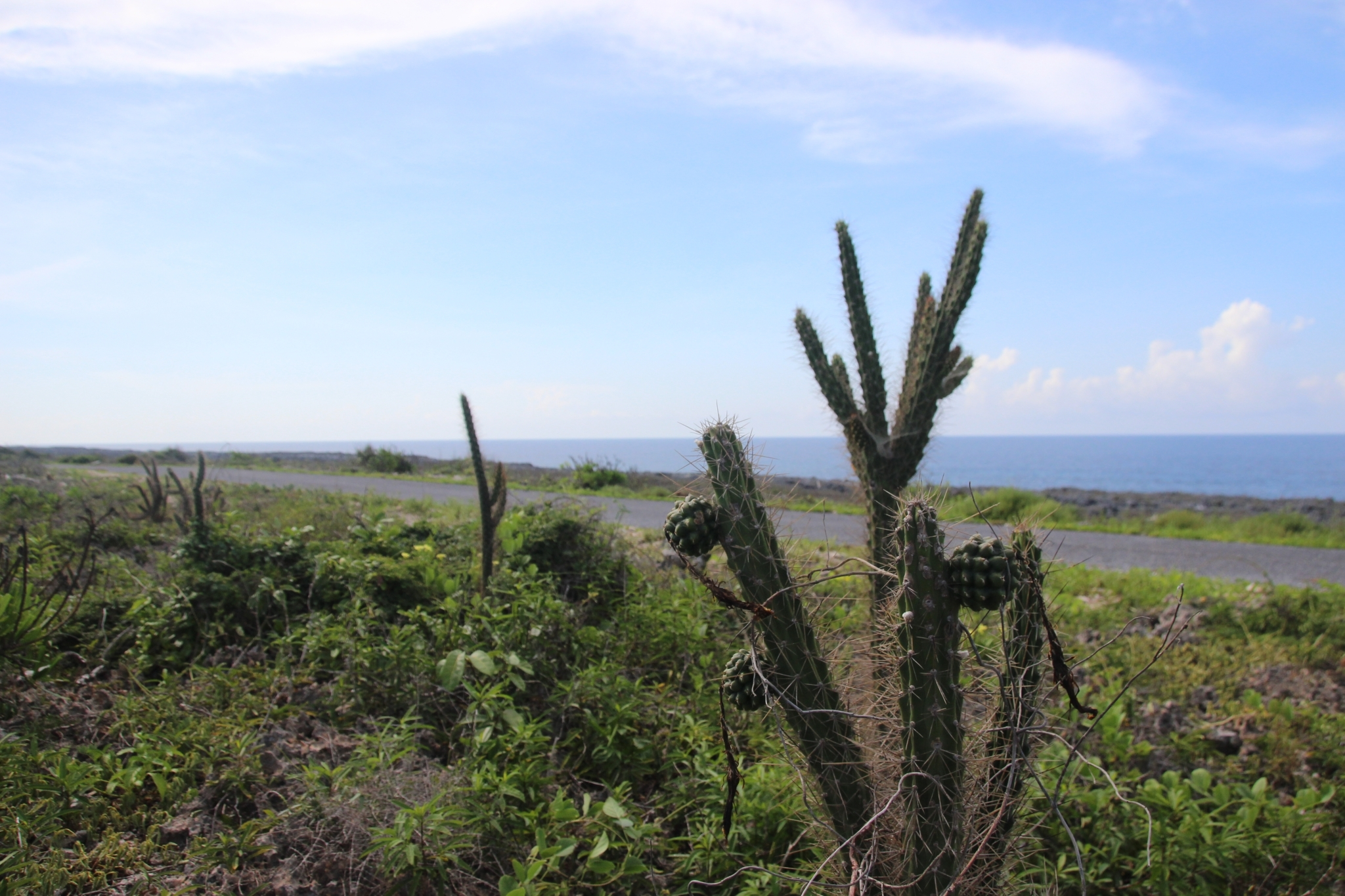
Habitat in El Holandés, Cuba

== Taxonomy ==
The first description was made in 1981 by L. Alberto E. Areces-Mallea. The specific epithet taetra means 'hideous, hideous, ugly, repulsive'.
