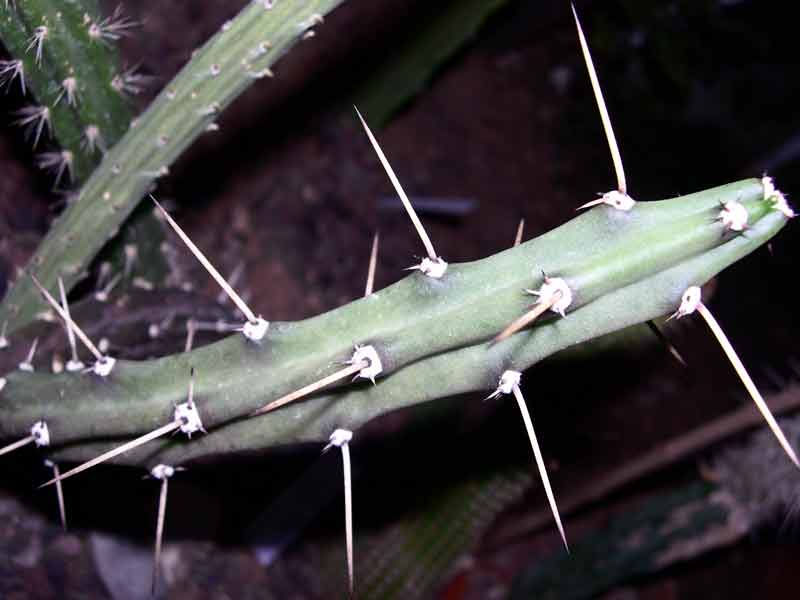

Scientific classification
- Kingdom: Plantae
- Clade: Tracheophytes
- Clade: Angiosperms
- Clade: Eudicots
- Order: Caryophyllales
- Family: Cactaceae
- Subfamily: Cactoideae
- Genus: Harrisia
- Species: H. regelii

Binomial name
- Harrisia regelii (Weing.) Borg

Synonyms
- Cereus regelii Weing. (1910; Eriocereus martini var. regelii (Weing.) W.T.Marshall 1941; Eriocereus regelii (Weing.) Backeb. 1936; Harrisia pomanensis subsp. regelii (Weing.) R.Kiesling 1996

= Harrisia regelii =

Species of cactus

Harrisia regelii is a species of cactus endemic to Argentina and Uruguay.

== Description ==
Harrisia regelii grows bushy, scrambling, upright, sometimes arched or prostrate, with green stems that have 4-5 tuberculate ribs. Plants have 1–4 spines, needle-like, initially reddish to almost white thorns later turn gray with a black tip. The individual central spine is 1 to 2 centimeters long. The flowers reach a length of up to 9–22 centimeters with reddish hairs on the buds, spineless and pale green sepals. The spherical, slightly bumpy red fruits have a few scales.

== Distribution ==
Plants are found growing from Argentina (Santa Fé, Entre Ríos) to Uruguay.
