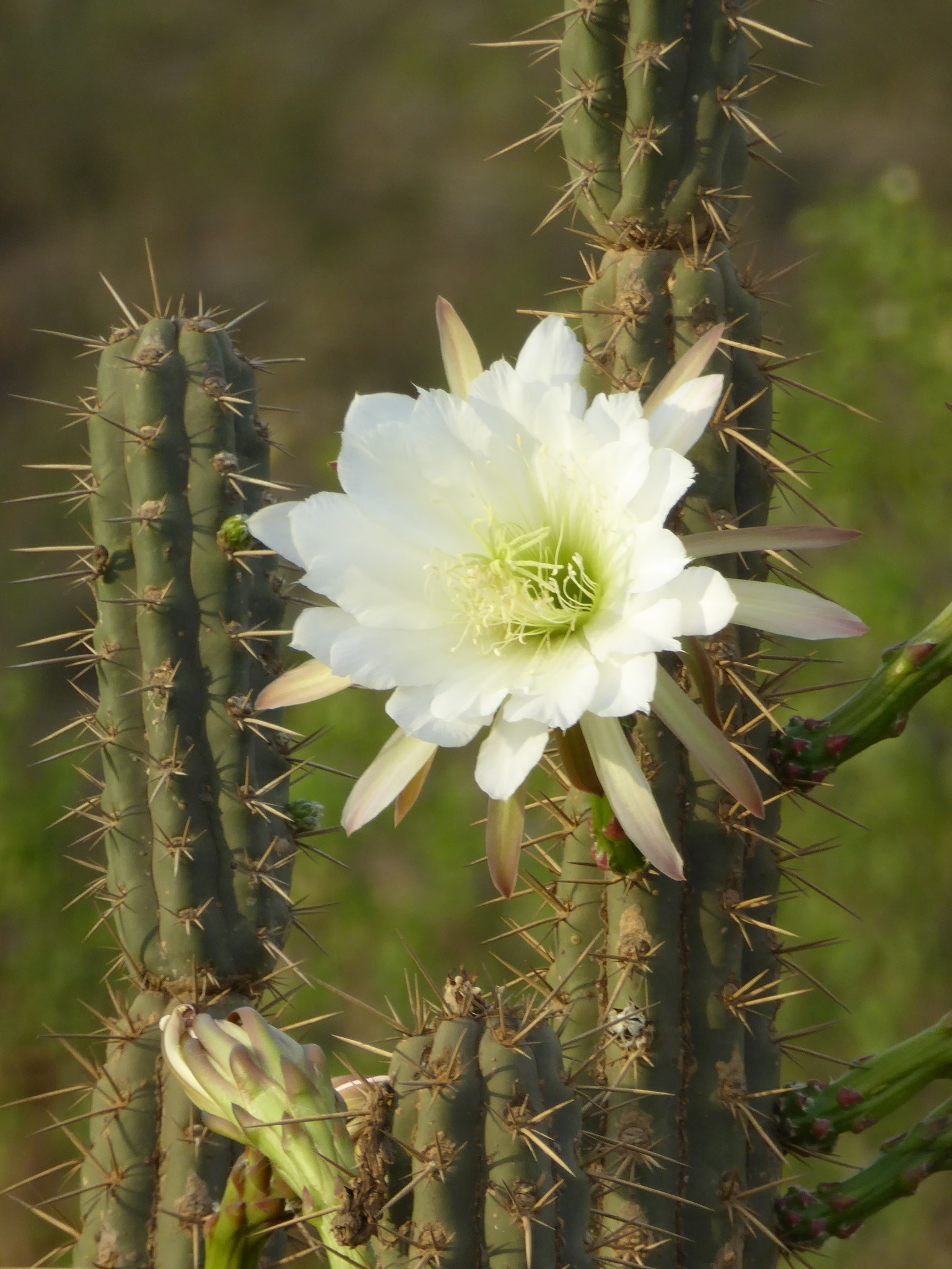

Scientific classification
- Kingdom: Plantae
- Clade: Embryophytes
- Clade: Tracheophytes
- Clade: Spermatophytes
- Clade: Angiosperms
- Clade: Eudicots
- Order: Caryophyllales
- Family: Cactaceae
- Subfamily: Cactoideae
- Genus: Harrisia
- Species: H. tetracantha

Binomial name
- Harrisia tetracantha (Labour.) D.R.Hunt

Synonyms
- Cereus tetracanthus Labour. 1855; Echinopsis tetracantha (Labour.) Anceschi & Magli 2013; Eriocereus tetracanthus (Labour.) Riccob. 1909; Roseocereus tetracanthus (Labour.) Backeb. 1942; Trichocereus tetracanthus (Labour.) Borg 1937; Cereus bolivianus (F.A.C.Weber ex K.Schum.) F.A.C.Weber ex K.Schum. 1902; Cereus tephracanthus Link & Otto ex Steud. 1840; Cereus tetracanthus var. bolivianus F.A.C.Weber ex K.Schum. 1897; Eriocereus tetracanthus var. boliviensis (F.A.C.Weber ex K.Schum.) Backeb. 1936; Trichocereus tetracanthus var. bolivianus (F.A.C.Weber ex K.Schum.) Borg 1937

= Harrisia tetracantha =

Species of cactus

Harrisia tetracantha is a species of cactus found in Bolivia.

== Description ==
Harrisia tetracantha grows in a shrub-like to tree-like manner, is usually branched above the ground and reaches heights of up to 3 meters. The blue-green to gray-green shoots have a diameter of up to 6 centimeters. There are eight rounded and tuberous ribs. The single, strong, initially brownish central spine later becomes white to ash-gray. The four to seven white marginal spines have a brown tip.

The flowers reach a length of 18 to 22 centimeters.

== Distribution ==
Harrisia tetracantha is found growing in open forest in the Bolivian departments of Cochabamba, Chuquisaca, Potosi, Santa Cruz and Tarija in dry scrub forest at elevations of 1200–2600 meters.

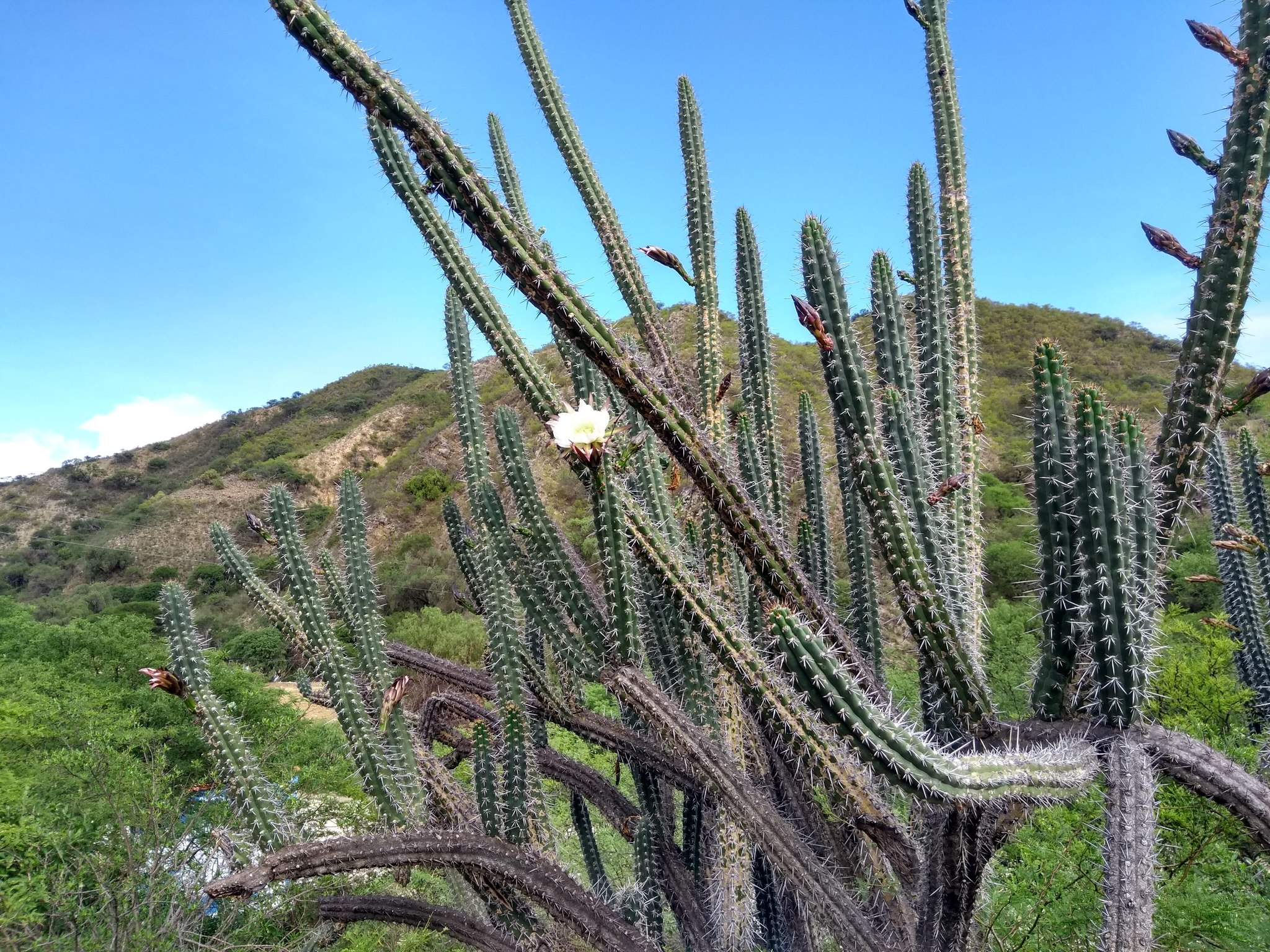
Habitat in Parajtí, Bolivia

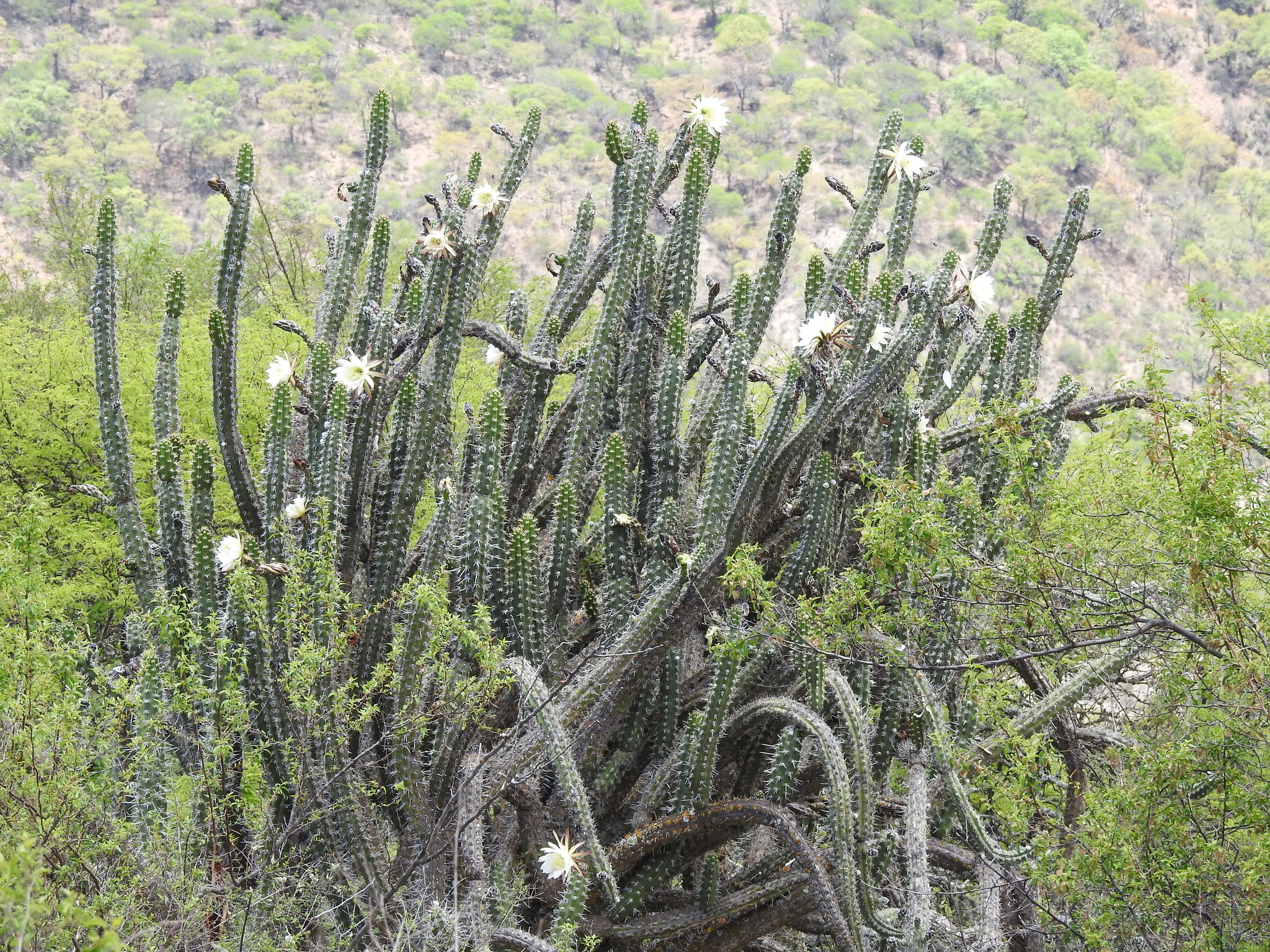
Adult blooming plant in Taipirina, Bolivia

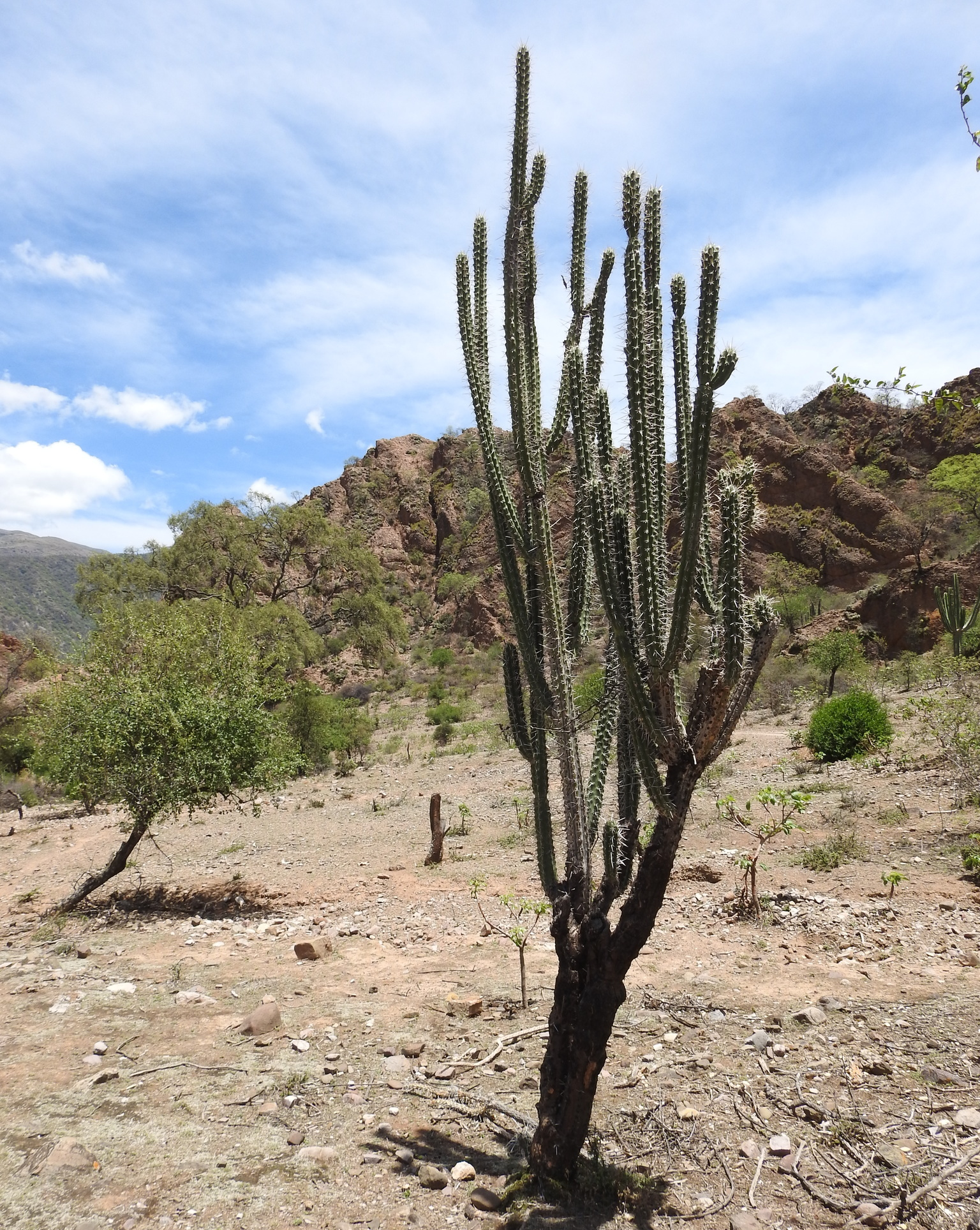
Habitat in Mojtulo, Bolivia

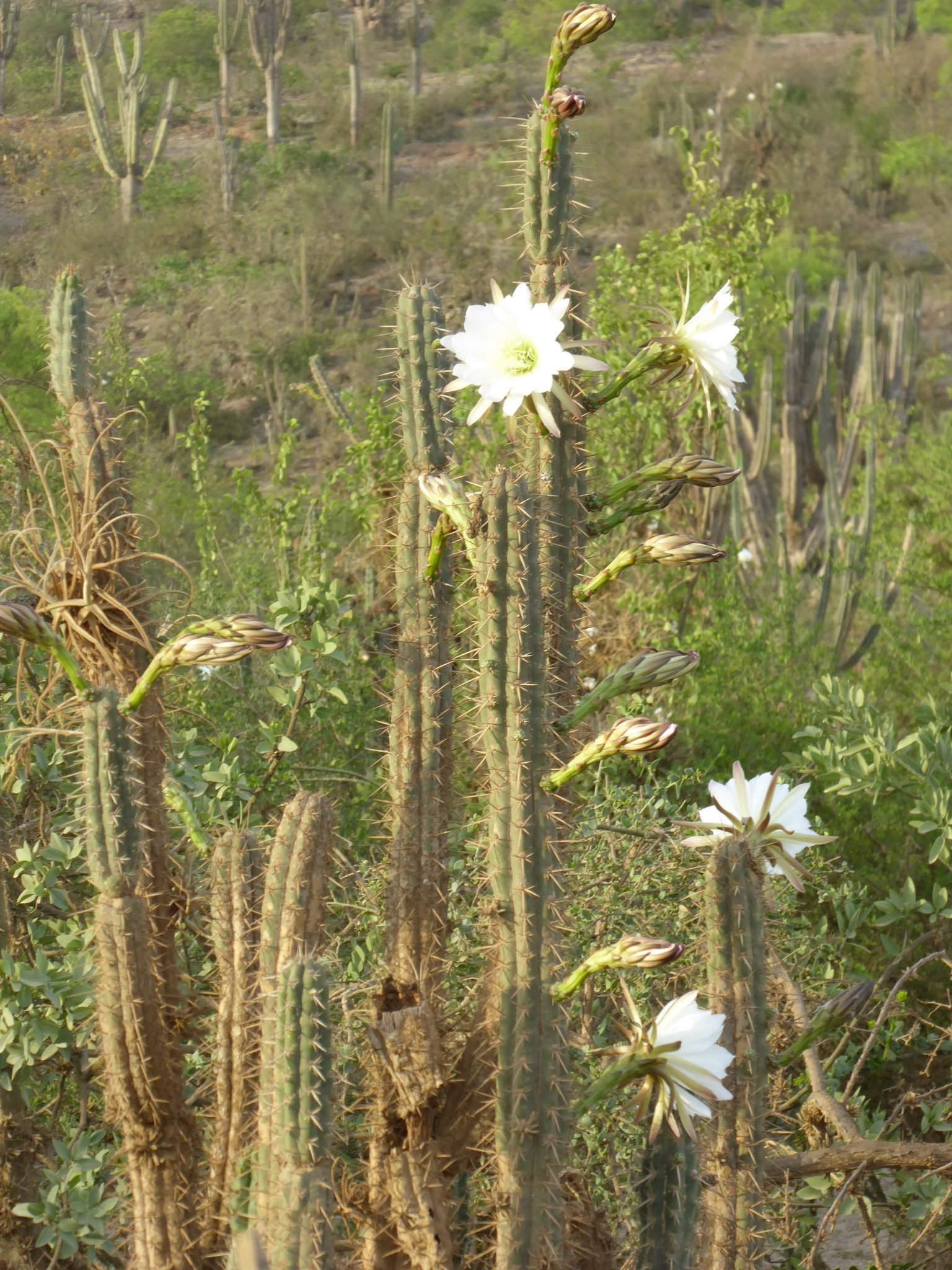
Plant in San José de la Capilla, Bolivia

== Taxonomy ==
The first description as Cereus tetracanthus was made in 1855 by J. Labouret. David Richard Hunt placed the species in the genus Harrisia in 1987. Further nomenclature synonyms are Eriocereus tetracanthus (Labour.) Riccob. (1909), Trichocereus tetracanthus (Labour.) Borg (1937), Roseocereus tephracanthus (Labour.) Backeb. (1942), Roseocereus tetracanthus (Labour.) Backeb. (1942) and Echinopsis tetracanthus (Labour.) Anceschi & Magli (2013).
