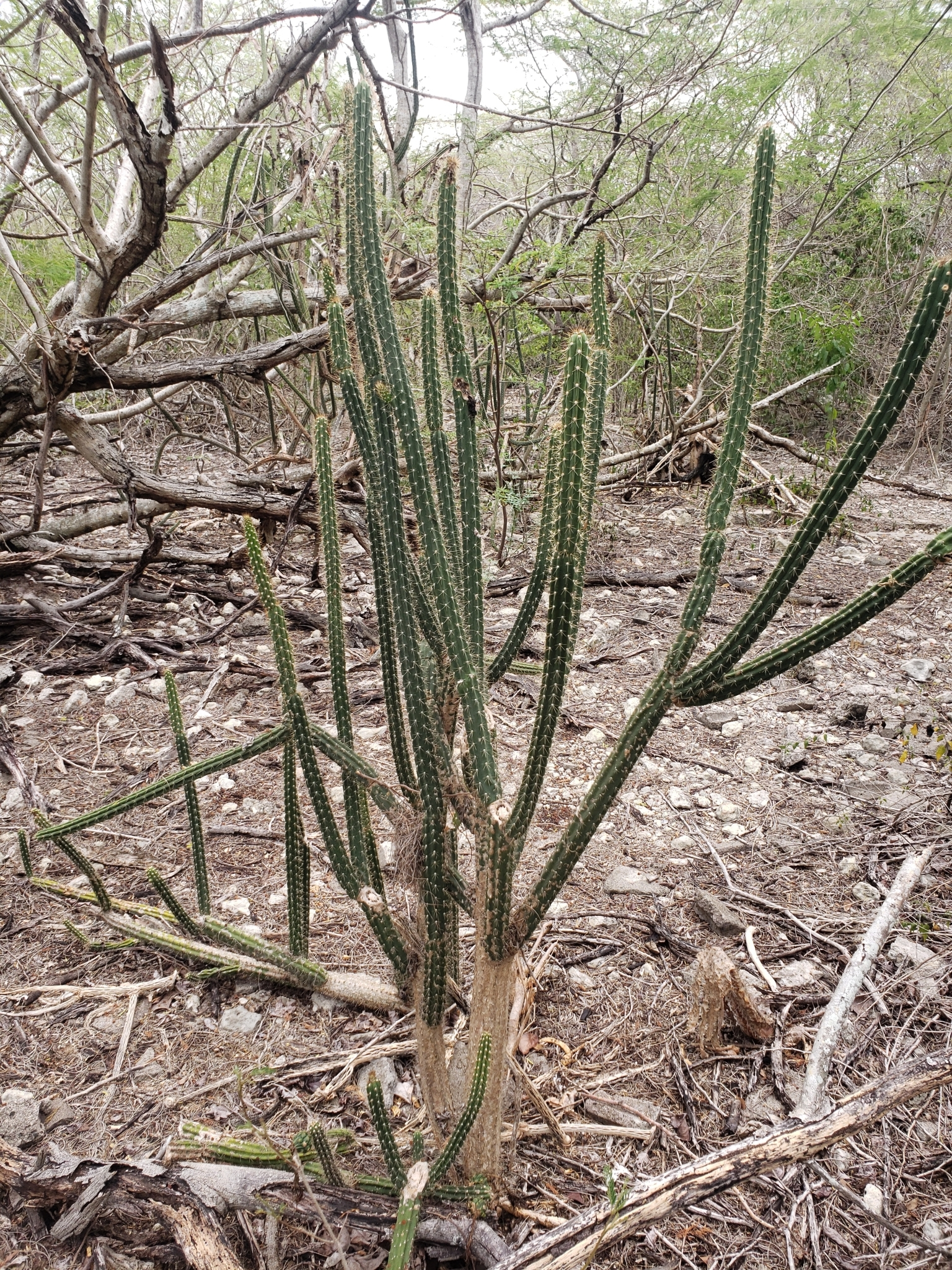

Conservation status
- Least Concern (IUCN 3.1)

Scientific classification
- Kingdom: Plantae
- Clade: Embryophytes
- Clade: Tracheophytes
- Clade: Spermatophytes
- Clade: Angiosperms
- Clade: Eudicots
- Order: Caryophyllales
- Family: Cactaceae
- Subfamily: Cactoideae
- Genus: Harrisia
- Species: H. gracilis

Binomial name
- Harrisia gracilis (Mill.) Britton

Synonyms
- Cactus gracilis (Mill.) Weston 1770; Cereus gracilis Mill. 1768; Echinopsis gracilis (Mill.) Molinari & Mayta 2015; Cactus subrepandus (Haw.) Spreng. 1825; Cereus imbricatus Pfeiff. 1837; Cereus subrepandus Haw. 1819; Harrisia donae-antoniae Hooten 1992

= Harrisia gracilis =

Species of cactus

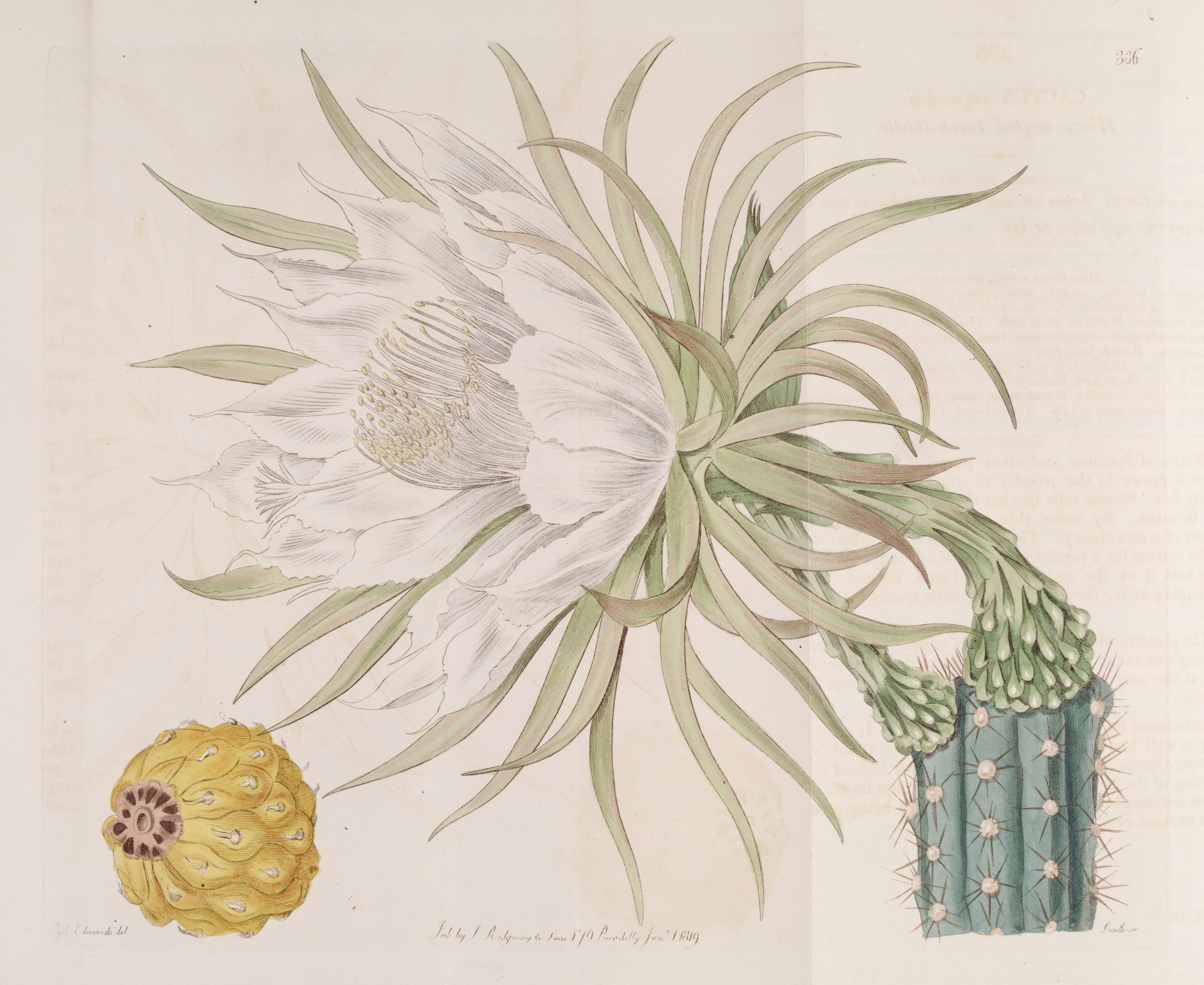
Drawing from 1818

Harrisia gracilis is a species of cactus found in Jamaica.

== Description ==
Harrisia gracilis grows shrubby, is richly branched and forms groups with upright to spreading shoots. The green, cylindrical shoots are greatly elongated. They have diameters of 2.5 to 4 centimeters and reach lengths of 3 to 5 meters. There are nine to eleven ribs. The seven to 16 thorns are spread out, straight, strong and needle-like. They are grayish ocher or gray, almost completely covering the shoots and are up to 2.5 centimeters long.

The flowers reach a length of 15 to 20 centimeters and a diameter of 10 to 12 centimeters. Its flower tube is covered with soft, white hairs. The yellow, smooth fruits are covered with a few hair-like thorns. They have a diameter of 3 to 6.2 centimeters and reach a length of 3 to 4 centimeters.

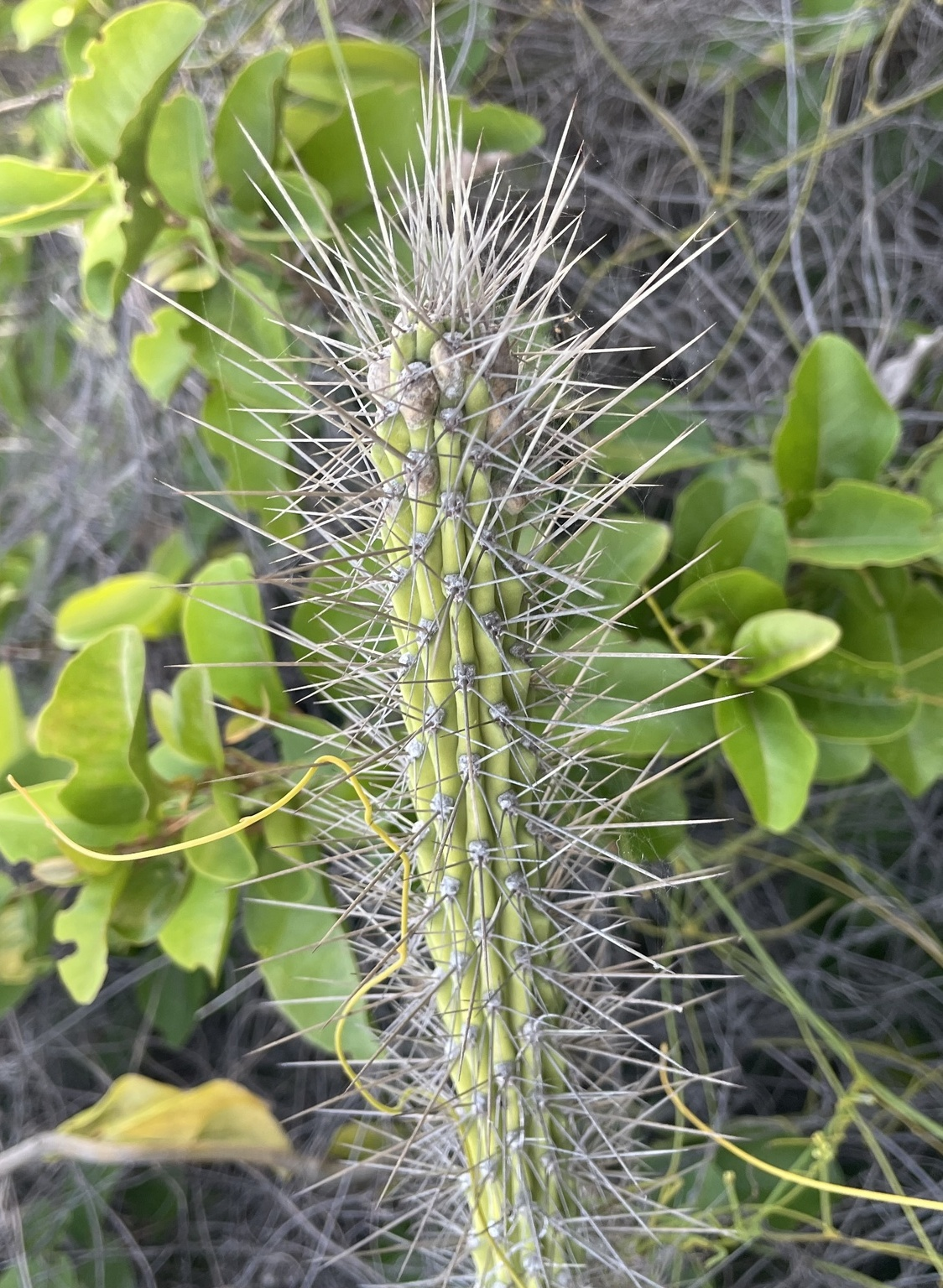
Stem and spines

== Distribution ==
Harrisia gracilis is found in scrub forest in the southern coast of Jamaica at elevations between 5 and 100 meters.

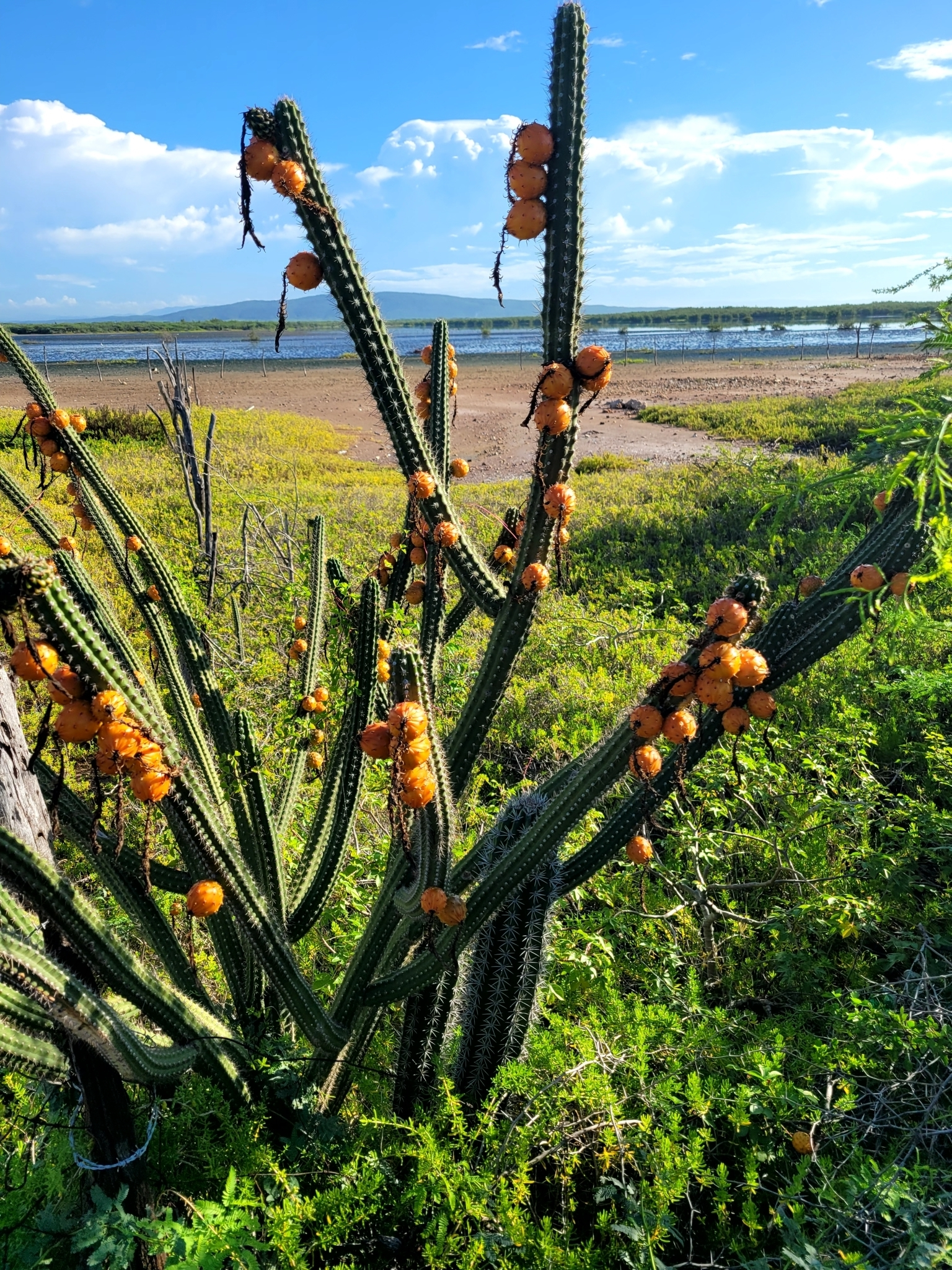
Fruiting plant in Portland Cottage, Jamaica

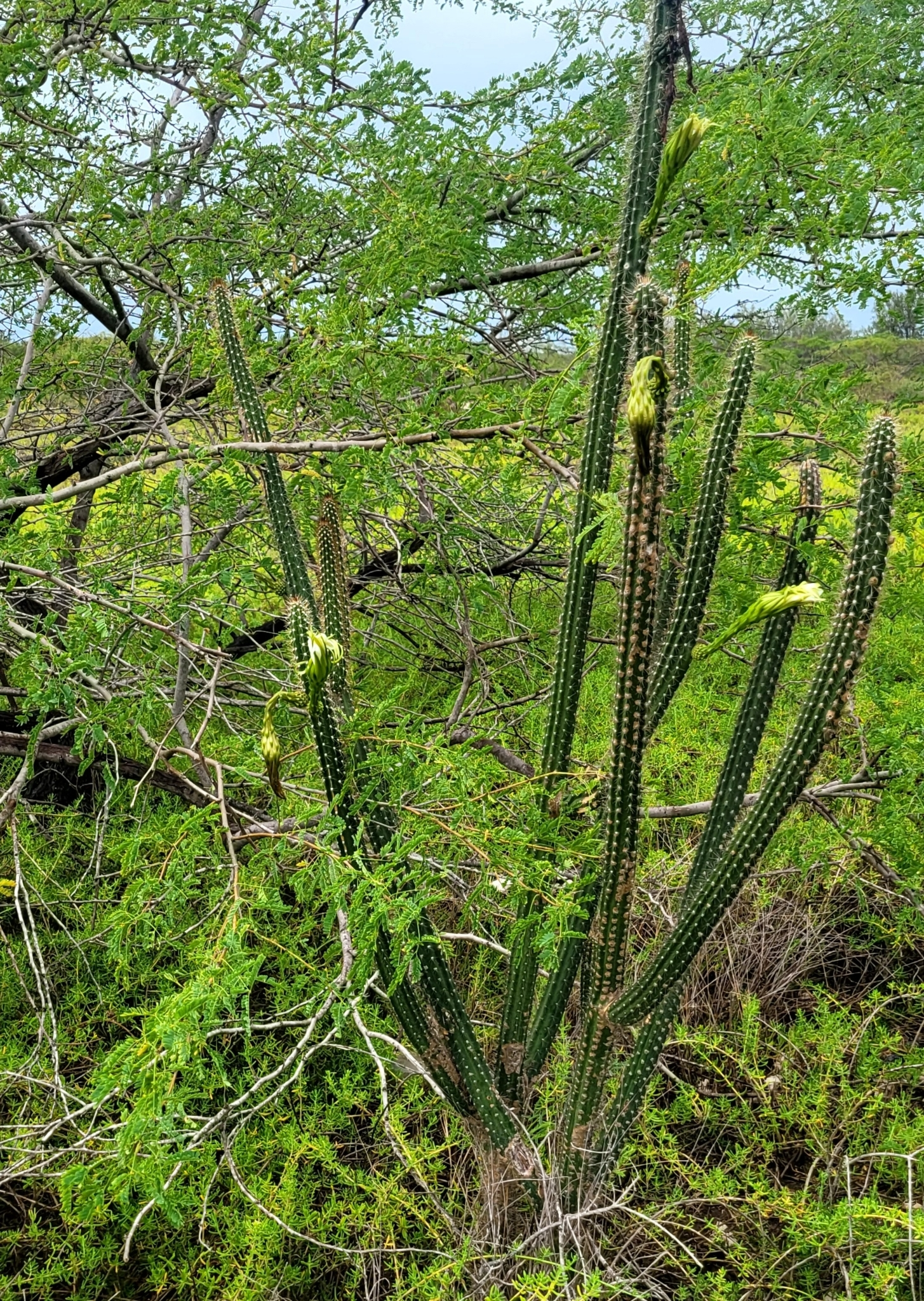
Plant growing in Salt River, Jamaica

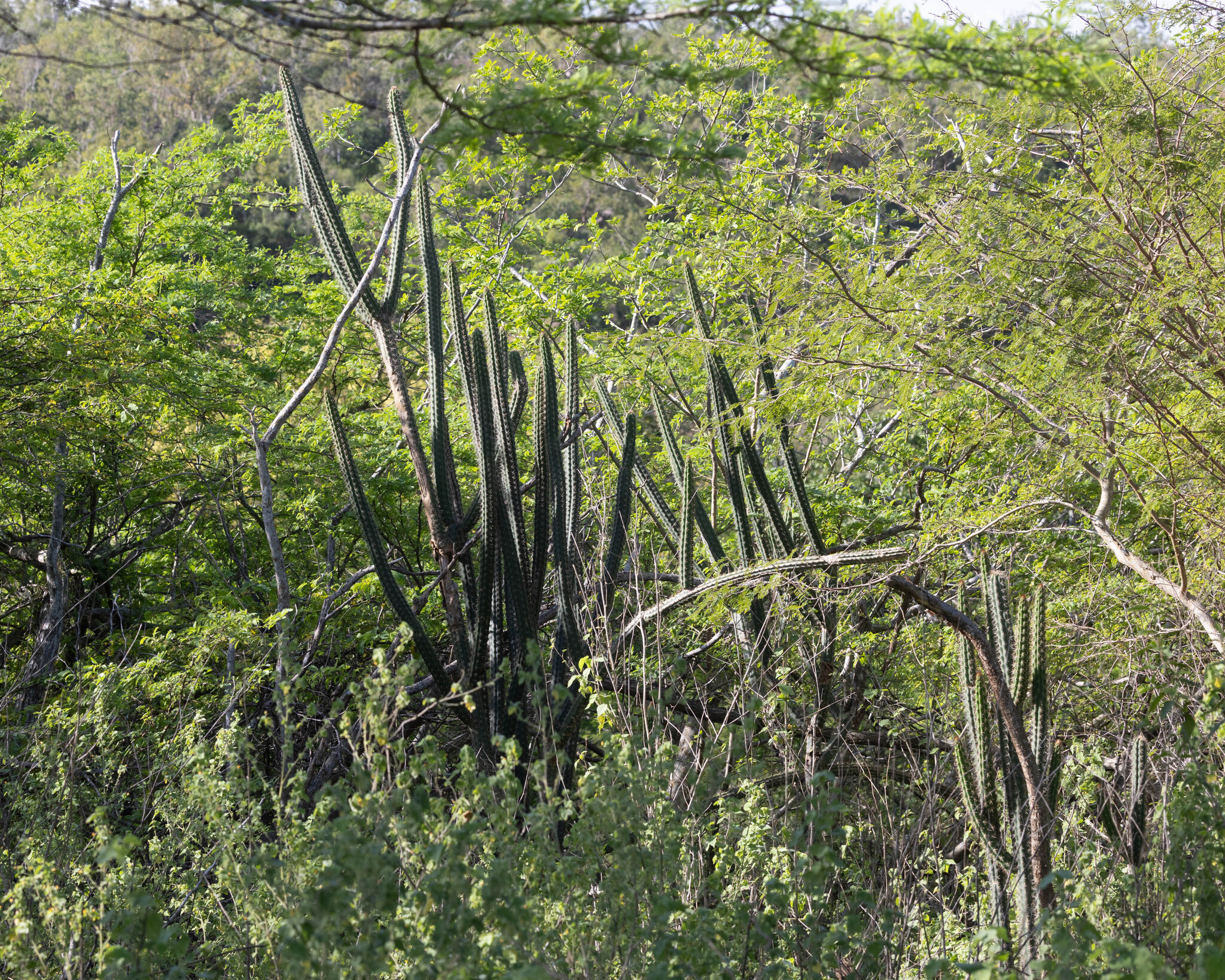
Plant in habitat in Portland Cottage, Jamaica

== Taxonomy ==
It was first described as Cereus gracilis in 1768 by Philip Miller. The specific epithet gracilis means 'delicate, slim, thin'. Nathaniel Lord Britton placed the species in the genus Harrisia in 1909. Other nomenclature synonyms are Cactus gracilis (Mill.) Weston (1770) and Echinopsis gracilis (Mill.) Molinari & Mayta (2015).
