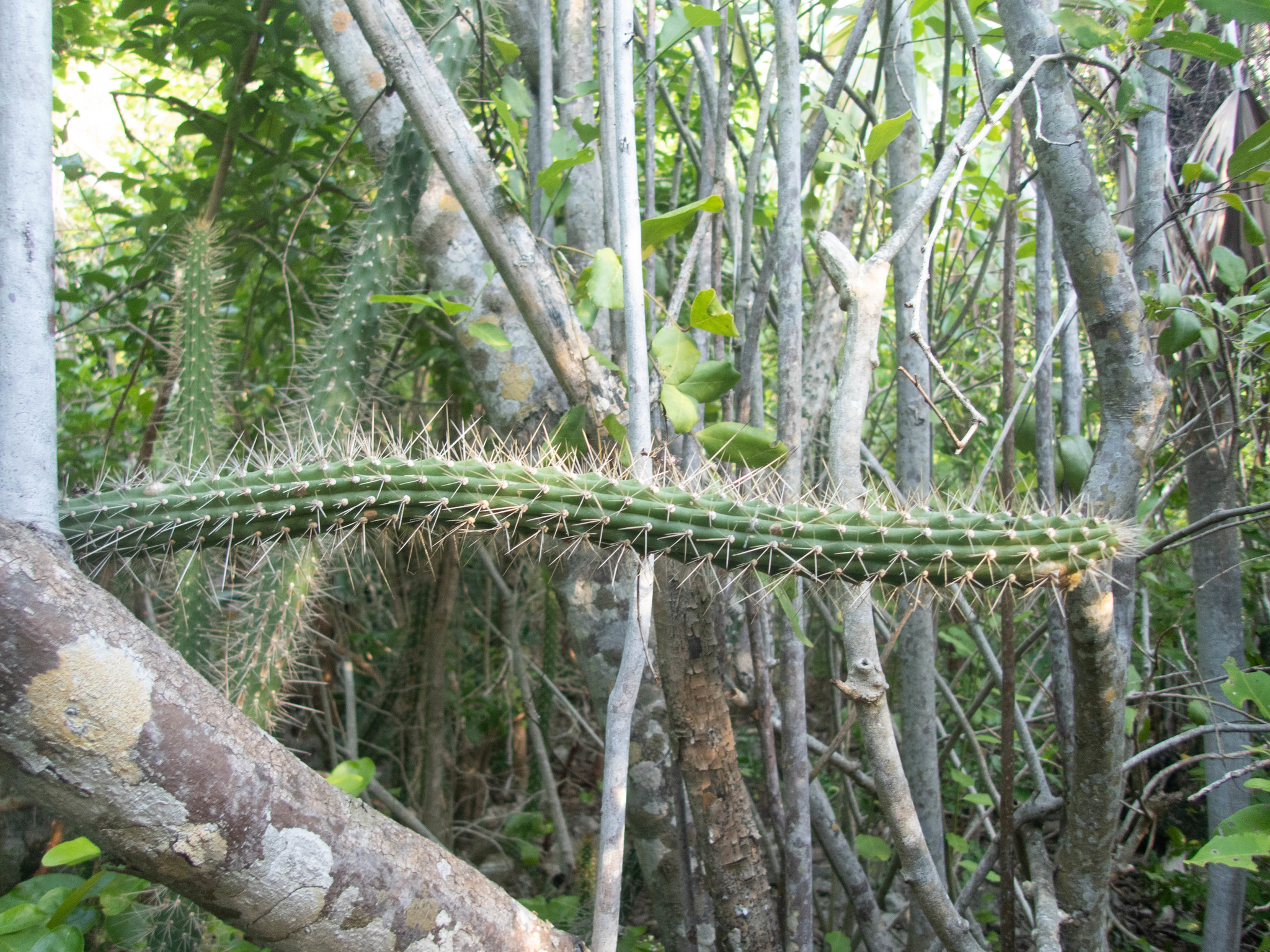

Scientific classification
- Kingdom: Plantae
- Clade: Embryophytes
- Clade: Tracheophytes
- Clade: Spermatophytes
- Clade: Angiosperms
- Clade: Eudicots
- Order: Caryophyllales
- Family: Cactaceae
- Subfamily: Cactoideae
- Genus: Harrisia
- Species: H. caymanensis

Binomial name
- Harrisia caymanensis A.R.Franck

= Harrisia caymanensis =

Species of cactus

Harrisia caymanensis is a species of cactus found in the Cayman and Swan Islands.

== Description ==
Harrisia caymanensis grows as a shrub light green shoots, often as long or longer than stem width, to 2.5 cm (1 in) long and 0.5 mm (0.02 in) thick. The distal areoles often overlapping 6.5 cm (2.6 in) long and 0.7 mm (0.03 in) thick.

The flowers are around 15 centimetres (6 inches) long. Its pericarpel are scales light green to green, ovate-lanceolate. The yellowish, ellipsoid to spherical fruits are smooth. Seeds 1.4 mm–1.5 mm × 1.9 mm–2.1 mm (0.055 in–0.059 in × 0.075 in–0.083 in).

== Distribution ==
Harrisia caymanensis grow in coastal scrub and scrubby woodland on exposed limestone rock in the Cayman and Swan Islands at elevations of 5–50 metres (16–164 feet).
