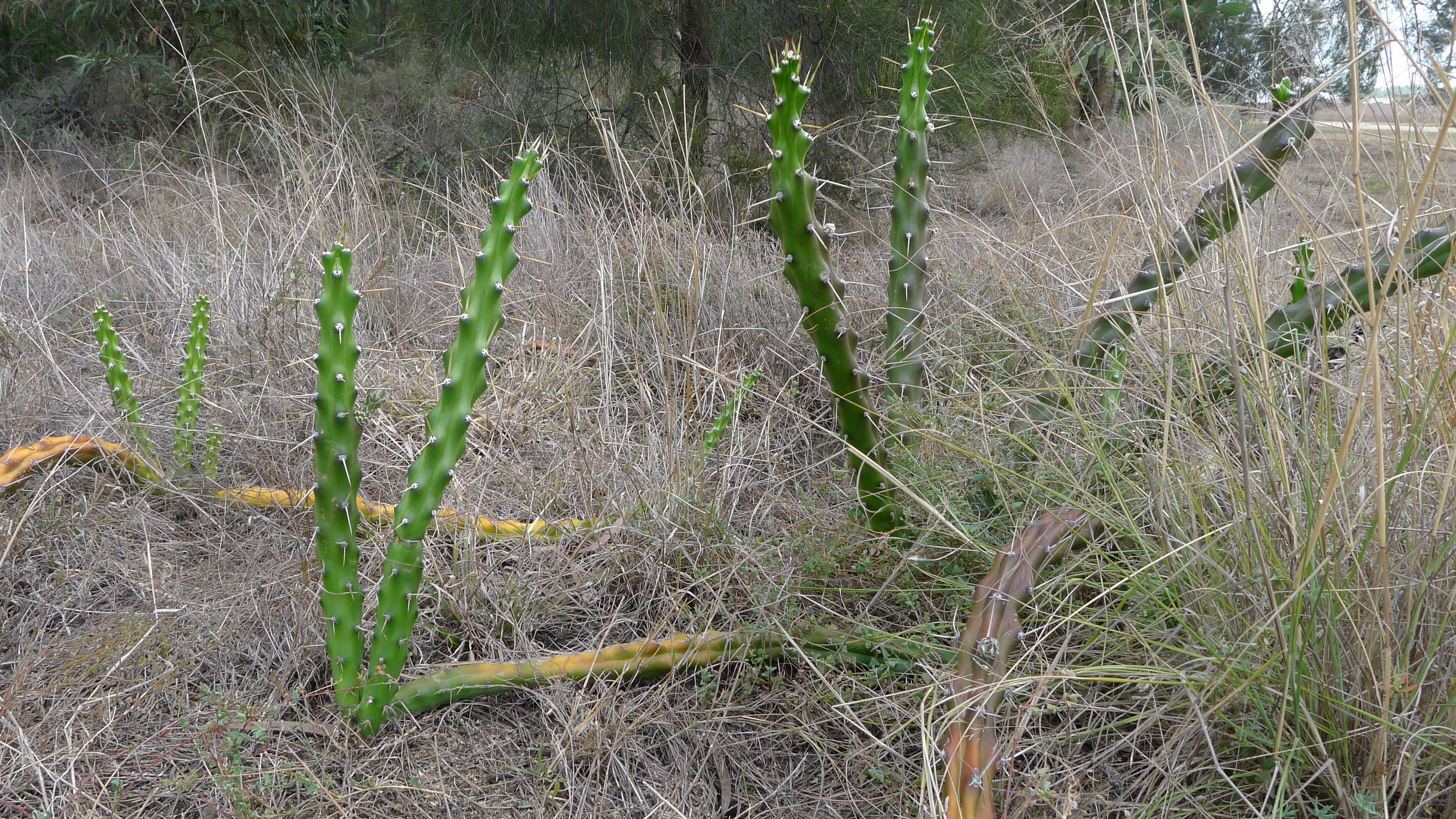

Conservation status
- Least Concern (IUCN 3.1)

Scientific classification
- Kingdom: Plantae
- Clade: Tracheophytes
- Clade: Angiosperms
- Clade: Eudicots
- Order: Caryophyllales
- Family: Cactaceae
- Subfamily: Cactoideae
- Genus: Harrisia
- Species: H. martinii

Binomial name
- Harrisia martinii (Labour.) Britton

Synonyms
- Cereus martinii Labour. 1854; Echinopsis martinii (Labour.) Anceschi & Magli 2021; Eriocereus martinii (Labour.) Riccob. 1909; Cereus martinii var. perviridis Weing. 1914; Cereus monacanthus Cels ex K.Schum. 1897; Eriocereus perviridis (Weing.) Backeb. 1936; Harrisia perviridis (Weing.) Borg 1937; Pilocereus monacanthus Lawr. 1841

= Harrisia martinii =

Species of cactus

Harrisia martinii, commonly called the Martin applecactus, is a species of night-blooming, rope-like cacti native to South America. With large showy flowers that attract the hawk moth, it is considered by some a useful landscape plant in areas that do not freeze.

== Description ==
Harrisia martinii grows richly branched with spreading, green to gray-green shoots that reach lengths of up to 2 meters or more with diameters of 2 to 2.5 centimeters. Young shoots are tapered to a point and have four to five edges. Older shoots are round. The single strong, yellowish central spine has a darker tip and is 2 to 3 centimeters long. The five to seven marginal spines are significantly shorter.

The flowers reach a length of up to 20 centimeters. Their pericarpel is covered with scales and brown wool. The more or less spherical, red fruits are tuberous and have scales and thorns. The plant has edible red globular fruit.

== Distribution ==
Harrisia martinii is widespread in the Chaco vegetation in Paraguay and the Argentine provinces of Formosa, Chaco, Corrientes, Entre Ríos and Santa Fe at elevations of 50–100 meters. The species was first found in Brazil in 2007

Harrisia martinii is considered an exotic invasive in Australia, South Africa, and the U.S. state of Hawaii.

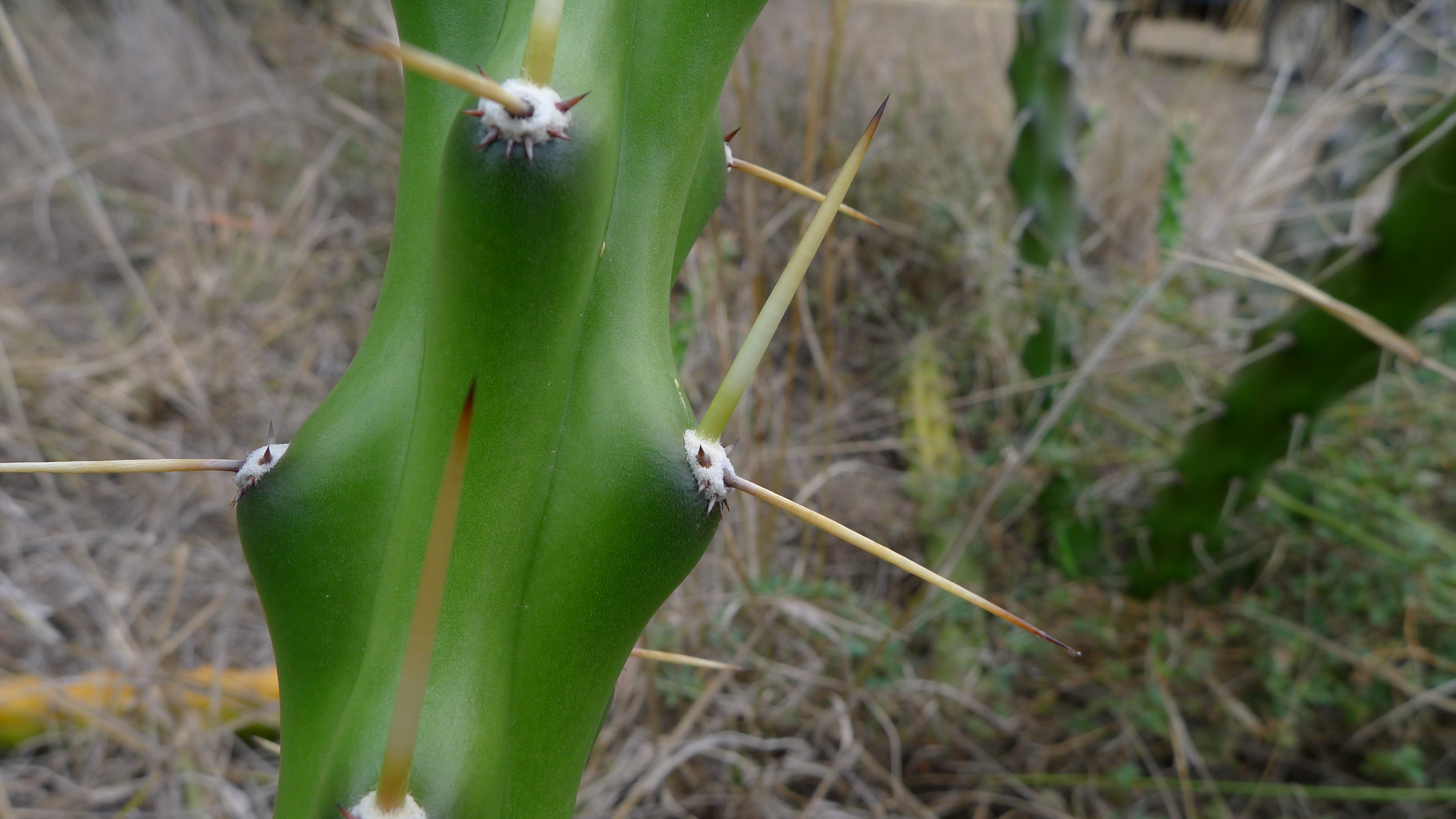

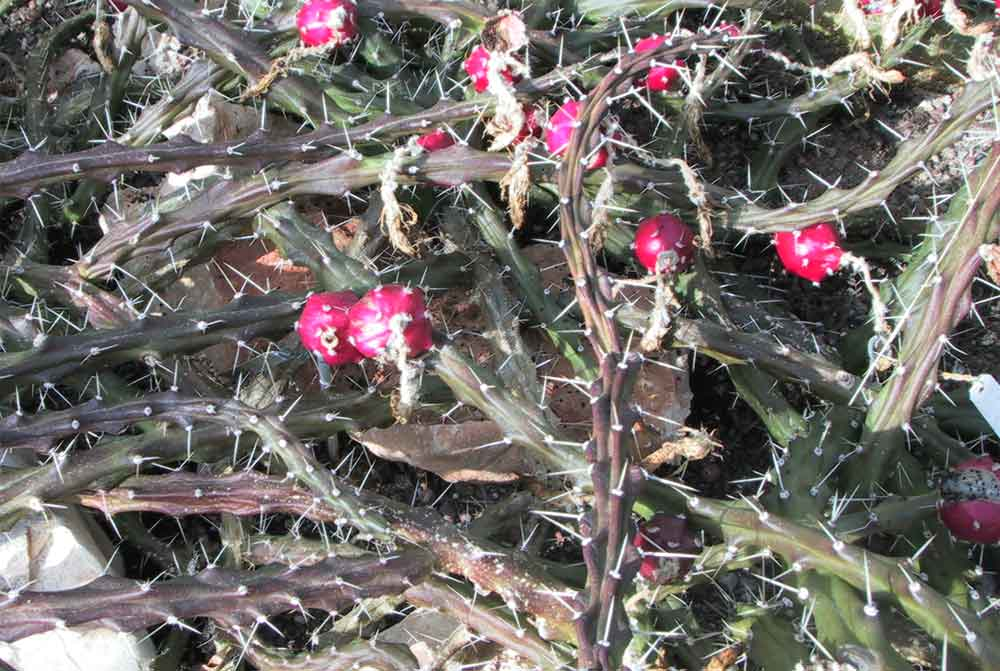

== Taxonomy ==
The first description as Cereus martinii was made in 1854 by J. Labouret. The specific epithet martinii honors the French cactus lover Raymond Martin from Toulouse. Nathaniel Lord Britton placed the species in the genus Harrisia in 1917. A nomenclature synonym is Eriocereus martinii (Labour.) Riccob. (1909).
