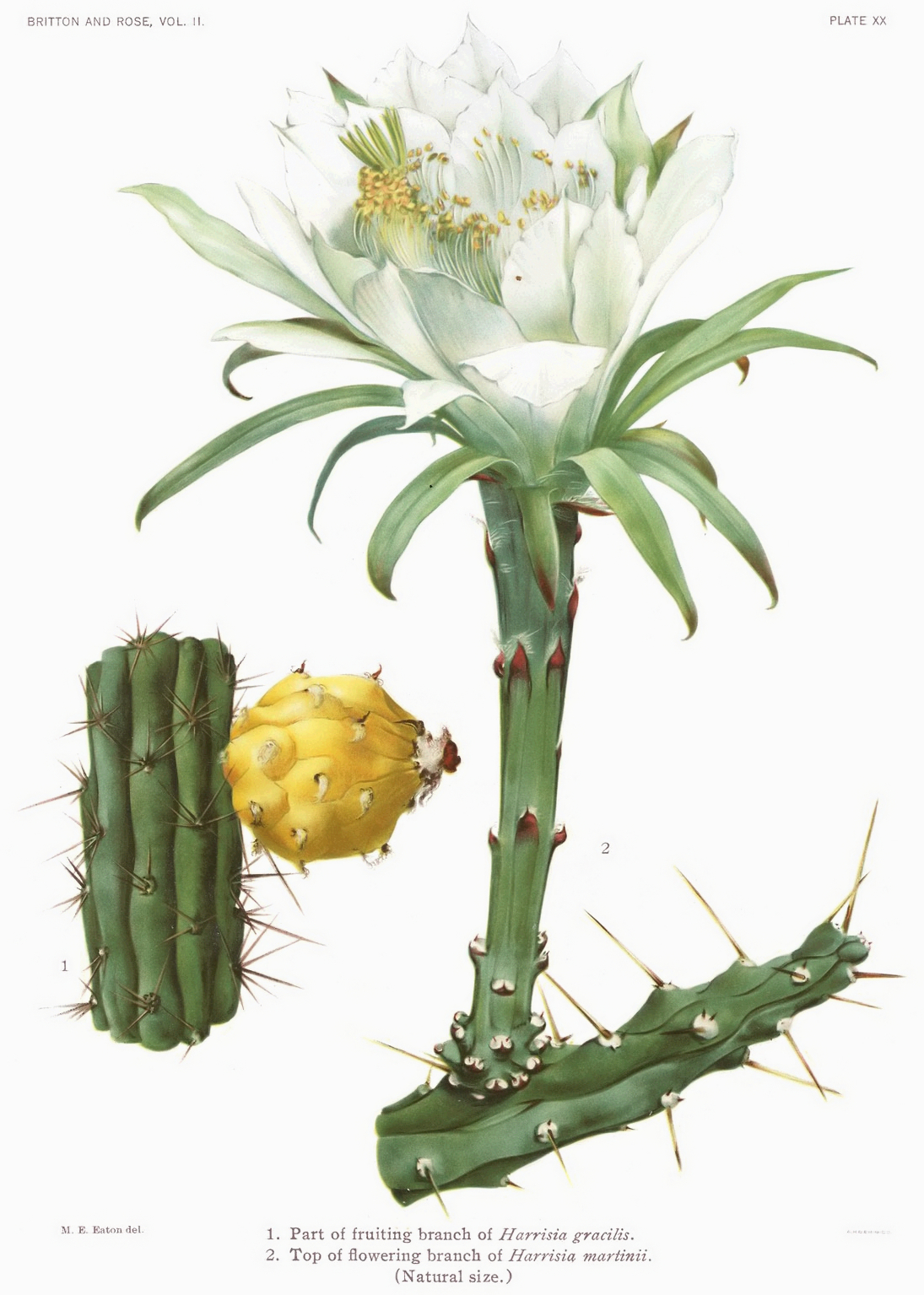
- Harrisia gracilis and Harrisia martinii

Scientific classification
- Kingdom: Plantae
- Clade: Tracheophytes
- Clade: Angiosperms
- Clade: Eudicots
- Order: Caryophyllales
- Family: Cactaceae
- Subfamily: Cactoideae
- Tribe: Cereeae
- Subtribe: Trichocereinae
- Genus: Harrisia; Britton

Type species
- Harrisia gracilis

Species
- See text.

Synonyms
- Eriocereus Riccob.; Erythrocereus Houghton; Roseocereus (Backeb.) Backeb.

= Harrisia (plant) =

Genus of cacti

Harrisia (applecactus and moonlight cactus) is a genus of night blooming cacti.

== Description ==
They are tree-shaped, sometimes climbing or shrub-like cacti with cylindrical shoots. They reach heights of up to 7 m. The shoots are ribbed (four to twelve ribs) and do not form aerial roots. The flowers open at night, are white and up to 12 cm in diameter. After successful pollination, rounded fruits are formed, which are red to orange in color. The fruits have scales with areoles in the axils. The black seeds are 2 to 3 × 1.5 mm in size.

== Distribution ==
Plants are native to Argentina, Paraguay, Brazil, Bolivia, Uruguay, the Greater Antilles, the Bahamas, and the U.S. state of Florida. The genus is named after William Harris, an important botanist of Jamaica. There are about 20 species.

Harrisia is an exotic invasive in Australia in Queensland and New South Wales, in Africa, and in the U.S. state of Hawaii.

== Taxonomy ==
The genus was established by Nathaniel Lord Britton in 1909.

=== Species ===
As of September 2026, Plants of the World Online accepted the following species separated into two subgenera:

Subgenus	Image	Scientific name	Distribution
Eriocereus (A. Berger) A.R. Franck		Harrisia bonplandii (J.Parm. ex Pfeiff.) Britton & Rose	Paraguay, Argentina, Bolivia
Eriocereus (A. Berger) A.R. Franck		Harrisia martinii (Labour.) Britton	E. Paraguay to NE. Argentina.
Eriocereus (A. Berger) A.R. Franck		Harrisia pomanensis (F.A.C.Weber ex K.Schum.) Britton & Rose	Argentina, Bolivia, Paraguay
Eriocereus (A. Berger) A.R. Franck		Harrisia regelii (Weing.) Borg	Argentina (Santa Fé, Entre Ríos) to Uruguay.
Eriocereus (A. Berger) A.R. Franck		Harrisia tetracantha (Labour.) D.R.Hunt	Bolivia.
Eriocereus (A. Berger) A.R. Franck		Harrisia tortuosa (J.Forbes) Britton & Rose	Bolivia to Uruguay.
Harrisia		Harrisia aboriginum Small ex Britton & Rose	Florida, on the Gulf Coast of Lee, Sarasota, and Charlotte Counties.
Harrisia		Harrisia adscendens (Gürke) Britton & Rose	Brazil
Harrisia		Harrisia brookii Britton	Bahamas.
Harrisia		Harrisia caymanensis A.R.Franck	Cayman Islands, Swan Islands.
Harrisia		Harrisia divaricata (Lam.) Backeb.	Hispaniola.
Harrisia		Harrisia earlei Britton & Rose	Cuba
Harrisia		Harrisia eriophora (Pfeiff.) Britton	Cuba.
Harrisia		Harrisia fernowii Britton	Cuba.
Harrisia		Harrisia fragrans Small ex Britton & Rose	St. Lucie County, Florida
Harrisia		Harrisia gracilis (Mill.) Britton	Jamaica
Harrisia		Harrisia portoricensis Britton	Puerto Rico
Harrisia		Harrisia taetra Areces	Cuba.
