= Harrisia (fly) =

Scientific classification
- Kingdom: Animalia
- Phylum: Arthropoda
- Class: Insecta
- Order: Diptera
- Family: Tachinidae
- Subfamily: Exoristinae
- Tribe: Goniini
- Genus: Harrisia; Robineau-Desvoidy, 1830

Type species
- Harrisia scutellaris Robineau-Desvoidy, 1830

Synonyms
- Harrysia Rondani, 1865

Genus of flies

Harrisia is a genus of flies in the family Tachinidae.

== Species ==
- Harrisia brasiliensis Robineau-Desvoidy, 1830
- Harrisia scutellaris Robineau-Desvoidy, 1830
