= Schwenckia alvaroana =

Scientific classification
- Kingdom: Plantae
- Clade: Embryophytes
- Clade: Tracheophytes
- Clade: Spermatophytes
- Clade: Angiosperms
- Clade: Eudicots
- Clade: Asterids
- Order: Solanales
- Family: Solanaceae
- Genus: Schwenckia
- Species: S. alvaroana

Binomial name
- Schwenckia alvaroana Benítez

Species of flowering plant

Schwenckia alvaroana is a species of flowering plant in the family Solanaceae. It is a climbing shrub that grows in wet tropical biomes, at altitudes between 100–600 m (330–1,970 ft) and is native to Colombia, particularly the Caquetá Department.

It was first described by Venezuelan botanist, Carmen E. Benítez de Rojas, in 2006.

== Description ==
The species is closely related to Schwenckia americana within the same genus (Schwenckia), it has two fertile stamens with the staminodes gradually reduced in size. The corollas are similar in structure, and the leaves are solitary and distributed along the stem. However, it differs in having a smaller corolla (5–7.5 mm long rather than 9–13 mm), a calyx that is densely pubescent rather than loosely hairy, and a climbing habit, in contrast to the typically erect or procumbent stems of S. americana.
