= Schwenckia huberi =

Scientific classification
- Kingdom: Plantae
- Clade: Embryophytes
- Clade: Tracheophytes
- Clade: Spermatophytes
- Clade: Angiosperms
- Clade: Eudicots
- Clade: Asterids
- Order: Solanales
- Family: Solanaceae
- Genus: Schwenckia
- Species: S. huberi

Binomial name
- Schwenckia huberi Benítez

Species of flowering plant

Schwenckia huberi is a species of flowering plant in the family Solanaceae. It grows primarily in wet tropical biomes, particularly in shrubby savannas on well-drained soils. The species is native to the Amazonas region of Venezuela. It was discovered during a botanical research expedition on 27 February 1986, when the Venezuelan botanist Carmen Emilia Benítez de Rojas collected specimens and identified two new species of the genus: S. huberi and S. trujilloi.

== Description ==
Schwenckia huberi is a creeping herb with a taproot and a short primary stem that branches into long creeping shoots. The stems are silvery-green and densely covered with silky hairs.

The leaves have a firm, papery texture with petioles measuring 3–6 mm in length. The leaf blades are elliptical to ovate, ranging from 13–20 mm long (occasionally up to 40 mm) and 6–13 mm wide. Both surfaces of the leaves are covered with silky hairs mixed with long erect hairs. The leaf apex is obtuse to acute, while the base is cuneate (wedge-shaped).

The inflorescence is terminal and erect, forming a very loose panicle that can reach up to 55 cm in height. Its axis is smooth, reddish, and glossy. The flowers are numerous but usually fall early, with relatively few developing into fruit.

The calyx is tubular, about 4 mm long, slightly hairy externally, and divided into five acute lobes approximately 1 mm long. The corolla is erect, smooth, and dark with violet to brownish tones, measuring 1.1–1.2 cm in length.

The plant has two fertile stamens with laminar filaments that are hairy toward the base. The anthers are oblong and about 1 mm long.

The fruits are globose capsules, 2–2.5 mm in diameter, partially enclosed within the calyx. Each fruit contains 10–20 dark brown seeds.
