= Schwenckia longiseta =

Scientific classification
- Kingdom: Plantae
- Clade: Embryophytes
- Clade: Tracheophytes
- Clade: Angiosperms
- Clade: Eudicots
- Clade: Asterids
- Order: Solanales
- Family: Solanaceae
- Genus: Schwenckia
- Species: S. longiseta

Binomial name
- Schwenckia longiseta Casar.

Species of flowering plant

Schwenckia longiseta is a species of flowering plant in the family Solanaceae. It is native to southeastern Brazil, particularly in the state of Rio de Janeiro, where it grows mainly in wet tropical biomes. The species was first described by the Italian botanist Giovanni Casaretto. It was originally published in Novarum Stirpium Brasiliensium Decades in 1842, a botanical work describing plants collected in Brazil.

== Description ==
The plant has an erect, branched stem covered with fine hairs. Its leaves are petiolate, oblong to ovate-oblong in shape, nearly hairless, and have slightly rough margins. The flowers are borne singly on very short stalks arising outside the leaf axils. The flowers are yellowish-green and are distinguished by a corolla with five very long bristle-like appendages. The calyx is tubular and ribbed, with narrow pointed lobes as long as the tube. The corolla tube is about twice the length of the calyx and bears small rounded teeth between the long bristles.

== Habitat ==
The species was originally reported from the mountains of Serra d'Estrela in the state of Rio de Janeiro, Brazil.
