= Schwenckia mollissima =

Scientific classification
- Kingdom: Plantae
- Clade: Embryophytes
- Clade: Tracheophytes
- Clade: Spermatophytes
- Clade: Angiosperms
- Clade: Eudicots
- Clade: Asterids
- Order: Solanales
- Family: Solanaceae
- Genus: Schwenckia
- Species: S. mollissima

Binomial name
- Schwenckia mollissima Nees & Mart.

Species of flowering plant

Schwenckia mollissima is a species of flowering plant in the family Solanaceae. it is native to Suriname and Brazil. It primarily grows in wet tropical biomes.

Schwenckia mollissima was first described by the botanists Christian Gottfried Daniel Nees von Esenbeck and Carl Friedrich Philipp von Martius.

== Description ==
The plant is an undershrub covered in soft grayish-white hairs. Its branches are slender and become less hairy as they mature. The leaves are arranged alternately along the stem and range from heart-shaped to lance-shaped, with pointed tips and smooth or occasionally finely toothed edges. The upper surface of the leaves is bright green and sparsely hairy, while the underside is more densely covered with hairs, especially along the veins. The flowers are borne in a leafy cluster and have a straight, grayish-white hairy corolla. The fruit is an egg-shaped capsule containing irregular, wrinkled seeds.
