= Schwenckia hyssopifolia =

Scientific classification
- Kingdom: Plantae
- Clade: Embryophytes
- Clade: Tracheophytes
- Clade: Spermatophytes
- Clade: Angiosperms
- Clade: Eudicots
- Clade: Asterids
- Order: Solanales
- Family: Solanaceae
- Genus: Schwenckia
- Species: S. hyssopifolia

Binomial name
- Schwenckia hyssopifolia Benth.

Species of flowering plant

Schwenckia hyssopifolia is a species of flowering plant in the family Solanaceae. It is native to northeastern Brazil, where it primarily grows in seasonally dry tropical biomes. The species was first described by the British botanist George Bentham and published in Flora Brasiliensis in 1846.

== Description ==
The leaves are hairless, with the lower leaves borne on short stalks and the upper leaves stalkless. They are oblong in shape and have a truncate-hastate base. The flowers are arranged in a loose panicle with very short, glandular-hairy pedicels. The calyx teeth are much shorter than the calyx tube and are somewhat pointed. The corolla segments extend beyond the lobes between the sinuses.
