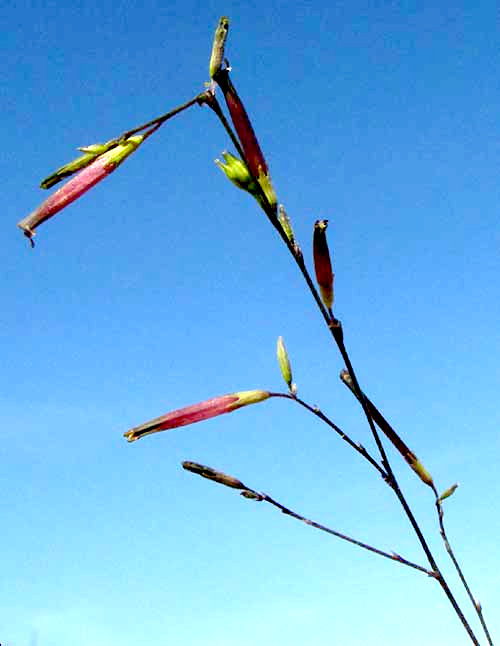
- Schwenckia americana in Mexico

Scientific classification
- Kingdom: Plantae
- Clade: Tracheophytes
- Clade: Angiosperms
- Clade: Eudicots
- Clade: Asterids
- Order: Solanales
- Family: Solanaceae
- Genus: Schwenckia
- Species: S. americana

Binomial name
- Schwenckia americana L.

Synonyms
- Schwenckia adscendens Schult.; Schwenckia americana var. angustifolia J.A.Schmidt; Schwenckia americana var. hirta (Klotzsch) Carvalho; Schwenckia americana var. macedo Carvalho; Schwenckia guianensis Benth.; Schwenckia guineensis Schumach. & Thonn.; Schwenckia hilariana DC.; Schwenckia hirta Klotzsch; Schwenckia karstenii Vatke

= Schwenckia americana =

Species of flowering plant

Schwenckia americana is a species of flowering plant in the family Solanaceae. The species is native to South America (Argentina, Paraguay, Brazil, Bolivia, Colombia, Venezuela, the Guyanas), Central America (Panama to Mexico) and the Caribbean (Cuba to Leeward Antilles), as well as being introduced and widespread in Africa.

It is an annual or short-living perennial herb, with grooved stems up to 90 cm (35 in) tall erect.

== Taxonomy ==
Schwenckia americana was first described by Carl Linnaeus in 1764. The species has a complex taxonomic history and has been published under many different names, including several varieties and synonyms, which are now all considered part of the same species.

Schwenckia americana var. angustifolia was first described in 1862. (Schwenckia angustifolia is a different species.) It was said to have narrowly linear leaves and all flower stalks (pedicels) elongated and very slender. It is no longer recognized as a distinct variety and is now treated as part of Schwenckia americana, reflecting the consolidation of several historically described forms into a single, variable species.

== Habitat ==
A weed in fields, woodland and disturbed localities, at elevations up to 1,100 m (3,600 ft) dry rocky open hillsides or open thickets, sometimes in brushy pine forests, at elevations up to 1,500 m (4,900 ft) in Guatemala.

== Uses ==
It is used by locals as a traditional medicine, as animal fodder, and is sometimes eaten.
