= Schwenckia trujilloi =

Conservation status
- Vulnerable (IUCN 3.1)

Scientific classification
- Kingdom: Plantae
- Clade: Tracheophytes
- Clade: Angiosperms
- Clade: Eudicots
- Clade: Asterids
- Order: Solanales
- Family: Solanaceae
- Genus: Schwenckia
- Species: S. trujilloi

Binomial name
- Schwenckia trujilloi Benítez

Species of flowering plant

Schwenckia trujilloi is a species of flowering plant in the family Solanaceae. It grows primarily in wet tropical biomes, particularly in shrubby savannas on well-drained soils. The species is native to the Amazonas region of Venezuela. It was discovered during a botanical research expedition on 27 February 1986, when the Venezuelan botanist Carmen Emilia Benítez de Rojas collected specimens and identified two new species of the genus, this species and S. huberi.

== Description ==
The plant is a multi-stemmed shrub with brownish-olive stems up to 4 m long. The stems are initially erect and leafless, later becoming flexible, somewhat branched, and leafy. The leaves are thin and membranous, borne on hairy stalks. They are broadly ovate, with pointed tips and broadly heart-shaped bases. The upper surface is sparsely covered with fine hairs, while the underside is hairier, especially along the veins.

The flowers are arranged in loose, branching clusters that may arise from the leaf axils or the ends of the stems. The flower stalks are 3–6 mm long and covered with fine hairs. The calyx is tubular and hairy on the inside, with five short lobes. The corolla is smooth, greenish-violet, and 1.5–2 cm long, with a cylindrical tube that gradually widens toward the top. It bears 5 small, curved tooth-like median lobes, and lateral lobes joined in a somewhat triangular shape.

The plant has two fertile stamens that extend beyond the corolla, along with an exserted style. The fruit is a small globose capsule containing 6–14 reddish-brown seeds.

== Rarity ==
Schwenckia trujilloi is listed on the IUCN Red List as Vulnerable in 2020 under criteria D2.
