= Schwenckia micrantha =

Scientific classification
- Kingdom: Plantae
- Clade: Embryophytes
- Clade: Tracheophytes
- Clade: Spermatophytes
- Clade: Angiosperms
- Clade: Eudicots
- Clade: Asterids
- Order: Solanales
- Family: Solanaceae
- Genus: Schwenckia
- Species: S. micrantha

Binomial name
- Schwenckia micrantha Benth.

Species of flowering plant

Schwenckia micrantha is a species of flowering plant in the family Solanaceae. It is native to Costa Rica and parts of northern and northeastern Brazil, where it grows mainly in wet tropical biomes. The species typically grows as a small subshrub. The species was first officially described by the English botanist George Bentham in the year 1846.

It was published in the famous multi-volume botanical encyclopedia Prodromus Systematis Naturalis Regni Vegetabilis

== Description ==
S. micrantha was described by George Bentham. Although the author did not see an authentic specimen of this species, the Riedel specimens preserved in the Imperial Herbarium of St. Petersburg.

It is annual or biennial herb, erect. Root fibrous, with thin descending fibers. Stems of the thickness of a raven's quill, branched either at the base or only at the apex, in some cases a foot and a half long, in others much shorter, cylindrical, subtly striated, grayish-pubescent. Lower leaves very shortly petiolate, upper sessile, all oblong-lanceolate, obtuse, entire, base auriculate-cordate, 6–10 lines long, 2–4 lines wide; floral leaves decreasing, all membranous, very thinly pubescent, grayish-green, median vein prominent beneath, secondary veins obsolete. Panicle large, loose, leafy, with erect branches and remote flowers. Pedicels very short, straight, angled. Calyxes campanulate, 4 lines long, nearly hairless, veined, 5-toothed, with short, somewhat pointed teeth. Corollas yellow-green, in the examined specimens sometimes minute, slightly exceeding the calyx, sometimes elongated, slender, 6–8 lines long, with club-shaped teeth barely exceeding the ovate lobes of the sinuses. Genitalia included. Capsule globose, somewhat pointed, slightly longer than the calyx, with membranous, intact, somewhat shiny valves. Dissepiment flat-compressed, margin thickened. Seeds numerous, angular, warty-wrinkled, darkening.
