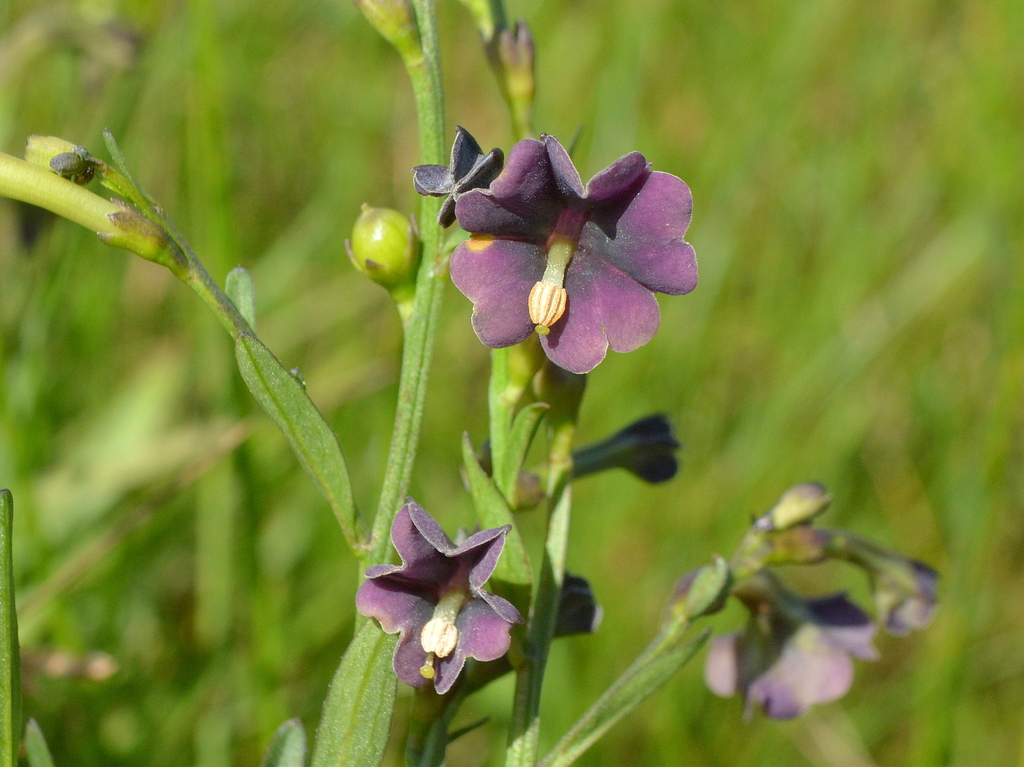
- Flowers of Schwenckia curviflora

Scientific classification
- Kingdom: Plantae
- Clade: Embryophytes
- Clade: Tracheophytes
- Clade: Spermatophytes
- Clade: Angiosperms
- Clade: Eudicots
- Clade: Asterids
- Order: Solanales
- Family: Solanaceae
- Genus: Schwenckia
- Species: S. curviflora

Binomial name
- Schwenckia curviflora Benth.

Synonyms
- Schwenckia curviflora var. tweedyana (Benth.) J.A.Schmidt; Schwenckia ovalifolia J.A.Schmidt; Schwenckia tweedyana Benth.

= Schwenckia curviflora =

Species of flowering plant

Schwenckia curviflora is a species of flowering plant in the family Solanaceae. It is native to southeastern and southern Brazil as well as southeastern Uruguay. It is a perennial plant that grows primarily in seasonally dry tropical biomes. The species belongs to the genus Schwenckia, a group of herbaceous plants and subshrubs mainly distributed in tropical regions of the Americas. It was described by Geroge Bentham in 1846 in Flora Brasiliensis.

== Description ==
This plant is completely hairless, with its stem growing in an angled position. Its leaves are long and narrow, with a slightly leathery texture and finely toothed edges. The flowers are arranged in a one-sided cluster, but there are only a few blooms. The leaves are heart-shaped.

== Taxonomy ==
Schwenckia curviflora was once confused with similar plants and given different names by early botanists. In the 1800s, George Bentham helped sort out its classification and described its variation. Schwenckia curviflora var. tweedyana has smaller, heart-shaped corolla lobes, but is otherwise similar to related forms.
