= Schwenckia glabrata =

Scientific classification
- Kingdom: Plantae
- Clade: Tracheophytes
- Clade: Angiosperms
- Clade: Eudicots
- Clade: Asterids
- Order: Solanales
- Family: Solanaceae
- Genus: Schwenckia
- Species: S. glabrata

Binomial name
- Schwenckia glabrata Kunth

Synonyms
- Schwenckia pallens D.Dietr.; Schwenckia patens Kunth

Species of flowering plant

Schwenckia glabrata is a species of flowering plant in the family Solanaceae. It belongs to the genus Schwenckia, a group of herbaceous plants and subshrubs distributed mainly in tropical regions of the Americas.

The species was first described by German botanist Carl Sigismund Kunth in 1818.

== Distribution ==
Schwenckia glabrata is indigenous to Colombia, Venezuela and northern Brazil. The species grows primarily in tropical environments, where it occurs in open habitats. It is adapted to warm climates and seasonal conditions.

== Description ==
The erect corolla are up to 4 cm (1.6 in) long and are infundibuliform (funnel-shaped) and gamopetalous (petals fused). It has obcordate inter-appendicular corolla lobes, which differentiate it from other species of Schwenckia.
