= Schwenckia paniculata =

Scientific classification
- Kingdom: Plantae
- Clade: Embryophytes
- Clade: Tracheophytes
- Clade: Spermatophytes
- Clade: Angiosperms
- Clade: Eudicots
- Clade: Asterids
- Order: Solanales
- Family: Solanaceae
- Genus: Schwenckia
- Species: S. paniculata

Binomial name
- Schwenckia paniculata (Raddi) Carvalho

Synonyms
- Matthissonia paniculata Raddi; Schwenckia divaricata Benth.; Schwenckia mollissima Gardner; Schwenckia pubescens Nees & Mart.; Schwenkia divaricata Benth.

Species of plant

Schwenckia paniculata is a species of flowering plant in the family Solanaceae. It is native to southeastern and south-central Brazil, where it grows primarily in wet tropical biomes. The species is typically found in tropical vegetation and open habitats.

The species was originally described by the Italian botanist Giuseppe Raddi under a different genus. It was later transferred to the genus Schwenckia by the Brazilian botanist André Maurício Vieira de Carvalho. The accepted name Schwenckia paniculata was published in the botanical journal Loefgrenia, issue 37 (1969).

== Description ==
The herbarium specimen of a dried Schwenckia paniculata shows a robust, straight stem with widely spaced branches and a scandent habit.

Leaves are alternate, petiolate, and broadly ovate to lanceolate with visible pinnate venation, remaining well-developed before gradually reducing into bracts near the apex.

== Taxonomy ==
Just like some other species in the genus, Schwenckia paniculata has a complex taxonomic history in which botanists have often treated different collections as separate species or varieties, which were later reduced to synonymy under S. paniculata after closer morphological comparison.
