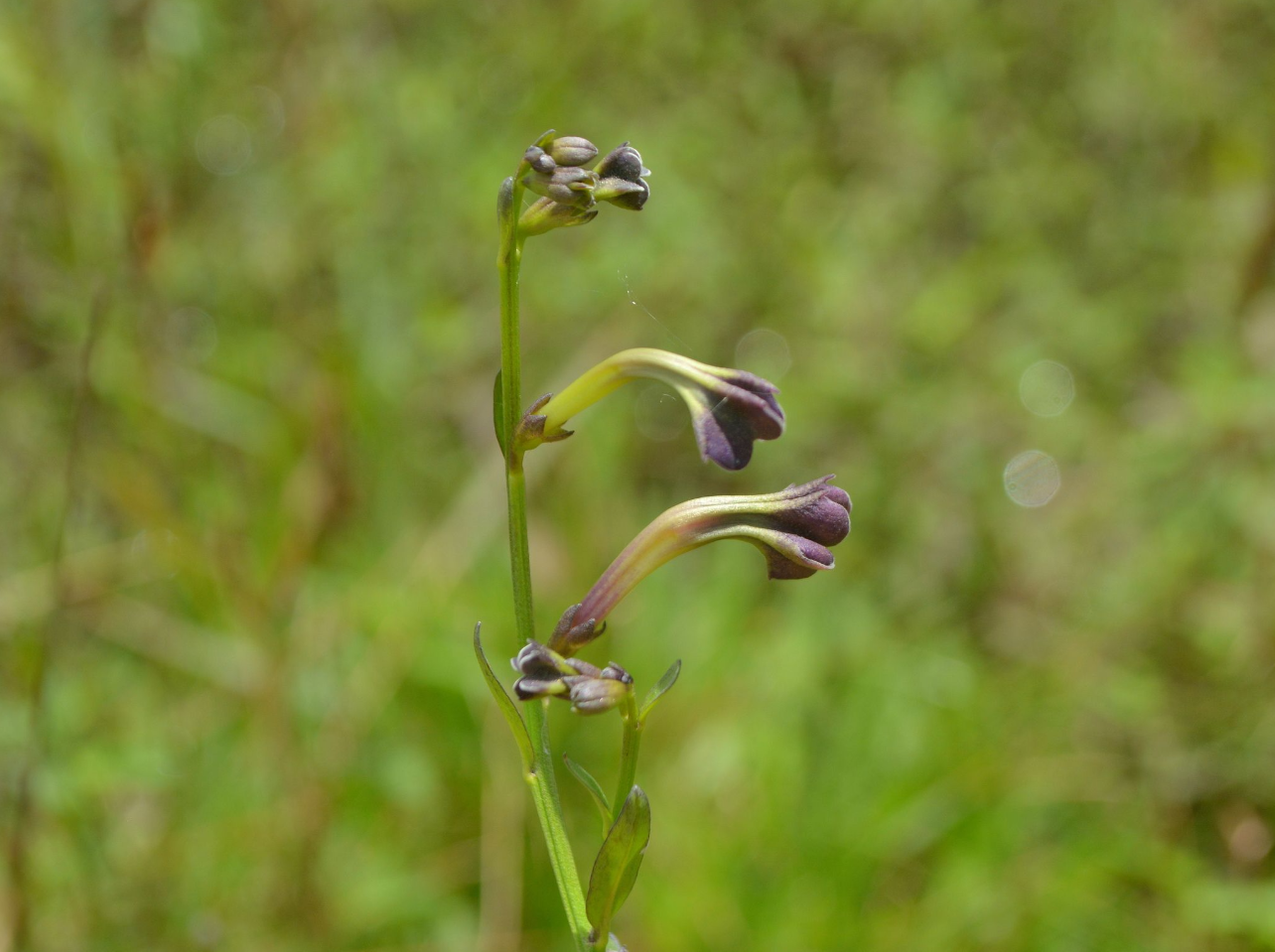
- Flowers of Schwenckia curviflora

Scientific classification
- Kingdom: Plantae
- Clade: Tracheophytes
- Clade: Angiosperms
- Clade: Eudicots
- Clade: Asterids
- Order: Solanales
- Family: Solanaceae
- Subfamily: Schwenckioideae
- Genus: Schwenckia; L.

Species
- See text

Synonyms
- Chaetochilus Vahl; Mathaea Vell.; Matthissonia Raddi

= Schwenckia =

Genus of flowering plants

Schwenckia is a genus of flowering plants in the family Solanaceae, native to Central America and South America, and with one species, S. americana, a widespread weed in Africa. In the title of the generic description Linnaeus wrote "Schwenkia" but gave the binomial of the type species as Schwenckia americana, while quoting Dav. van Royen as the author.

== Species ==
Currently accepted species include:

- Schwenckia alvaroana Benítez
- Schwenckia americana L.
- Schwenckia angustifolia Benth.
- Schwenckia aurantiaca Paucar & Stehmann
- Schwenckia breviseta Casar.
- Schwenckia curviflora Benth.
- Schwenckia elegans Carvalho
- Schwenckia filiformis Ekman ex Urb.
- Schwenckia glabrata Kunth
- Schwenckia grandiflora Benth.
- Schwenckia heterantha Carvalho
- Schwenckia huberi Benítez
- Schwenckia hyssopifolia Benth.
- Schwenckia juncoides Chodat
- Schwenckia lateriflora (Vahl) Carvalho
- Schwenckia longiseta Casar.
- Schwenckia micrantha Benth.
- Schwenckia mollissima Nees & Mart.
- Schwenckia novaveneciana Carvalho
- Schwenckia paniculata (Raddi) Carvalho
- Schwenckia trujilloi Benítez
- Schwenckia volubilis Benth.
