= Schwenckia volubilis =

Scientific classification
- Kingdom: Plantae
- Clade: Embryophytes
- Clade: Tracheophytes
- Clade: Spermatophytes
- Clade: Angiosperms
- Clade: Eudicots
- Clade: Asterids
- Order: Solanales
- Family: Solanaceae
- Genus: Schwenckia
- Species: S. volubilis

Binomial name
- Schwenckia volubilis Benth.

Species of flowering plant

Schwenckia volubilis is a species of flowering plant in the family Solanaceae. It is native to Brazil, where it primarily grows in seasonally dry tropical biomes. The species was first described by the British botanist George Bentham, and the name was published in 1846 in the botanical work Prodromus Systematis Naturalis Regni Vegetabilis.

== Description ==
The plant is an undershrub several feet tall capable of climbing. Its branches are slender, spreading, and somewhat angular, sometimes hollow or slightly flattened, becoming less hairy with age. The leaves are arranged alternately and are spaced apart, with long stalks. They are oblong to slightly heart-shaped, tapering to a pointed tip, with a wedge-shaped base and smooth margins. The leaves are thin, sparsely hairy—especially along the veins—and vary from yellowish green to bright green.
