= Schwenckia novaveneciana =

Scientific classification
- Kingdom: Plantae
- Clade: Embryophytes
- Clade: Tracheophytes
- Clade: Spermatophytes
- Clade: Angiosperms
- Clade: Eudicots
- Clade: Asterids
- Order: Solanales
- Family: Solanaceae
- Genus: Schwenckia
- Species: S. novaveneciana

Binomial name
- Schwenckia novaveneciana Carvalho

Species of flowering plant

Schwenckia novaveneciana is a species of flowering plant in the family Solanaceae. It is native to Brazil, particularly in the states of Bahia, Espírito Santo, and Minas Gerais, where it grows primarily in wet tropical biomes. The species occurs as a shrub, typically found in tropical vegetation and open habitats.

The species was first described by the Brazilian botanist André Maurício Vieira de Carvalho.
