= Schwenckia heterantha =

Scientific classification
- Kingdom: Plantae
- Clade: Embryophytes
- Clade: Tracheophytes
- Clade: Spermatophytes
- Clade: Angiosperms
- Clade: Eudicots
- Clade: Asterids
- Order: Solanales
- Family: Solanaceae
- Genus: Schwenckia
- Species: S. heterantha

Binomial name
- Schwenckia heterantha Carvalho, 1969

Species of flowering plant

Schwenckia heterantha is a species of flowering plant in the family Solanaceae, commonly known as the nightshade family. It is native to Venezuela and parts of Brazil, where it grows primarily in wet tropical biomes. The species was first described by the Brazilian botanist Lucia d'Avila Freire de Carvalho and published in Loefgrenia 33: 1 in 1969.

== Habitat ==
Unlike its sister species, which typically occur in dry tropical biomes or seasonally dry habitats, Schwenckia heterantha is the only species in the group known to inhabit wet tropical environments.

== Rarity ==
It is one of the rarest species in the genus, largely because it is the only one adapted to wet tropical environments.
