= Schwenckia filiformis =

Scientific classification
- Kingdom: Plantae
- Clade: Embryophytes
- Clade: Tracheophytes
- Clade: Spermatophytes
- Clade: Angiosperms
- Clade: Eudicots
- Clade: Asterids
- Order: Solanales
- Family: Solanaceae
- Genus: Schwenckia
- Species: S. filiformis

Binomial name
- Schwenckia filiformis Ekman ex Urb.

Species of flowering plant

Schwenckia filiformis is a species of flowering plant in the family Solanaceae.

The species was first collected by Swedish botanist, Erik Leonard Ekman and later described by German botanist, Ignatz Urban, with the description published in Symbolae Antillanae 9:251 in 1924.

== Distribution ==
S. filiformis is indigenous to Cuba, the Cayman Islands and Hispaniola. It grows primarily in seasonally dry tropical biomes.

== Description ==
The plant is an annual or short-lived subshrub reaching 35–40 cm in length and is completely hairless. Its lower stems become woody and produce numerous thin, thread-like branches. The leaves are sparse and vary in shape along the stem, ranging from elliptical or lance-shaped on the lower parts to very narrow, almost needle-like leaves near the top.

The flowers are borne in small, loosely spaced clusters. The calyx is tubular, while the corolla is pale blue and about 10 mm long, with a narrow cylindrical tube. The plant has two fertile stamens and several reduced sterile stamens. The fruit is a small oval capsule containing tiny brown, finely textured seeds.
