= Schwenckia elegans =

Scientific classification
- Kingdom: Plantae
- Clade: Embryophytes
- Clade: Tracheophytes
- Clade: Spermatophytes
- Clade: Angiosperms
- Clade: Eudicots
- Clade: Asterids
- Order: Solanales
- Family: Solanaceae
- Genus: Schwenckia
- Species: S. elegans

Binomial name
- Schwenckia elegans Carvalho

Species of flowering plant

Schwenckia elegans is a flowering species of the Solanaceae family or commonly named the Nightshade family. It was first described by Brazilian botanist, Lúcia d’Ávila Freire de Carvalho, in 1969, when it was published in Loefgrenia 33: 2, figs. 6-9. 1969.

== Distribution ==
The native range of this species is Colombia, Venezuela to Guyana and Northern Brazil. It is a subshrub and primarily grows in wet tropical biomes growing up to 1.2 m (3.9 ft). It can tolerant many rang of soil types.

== Uses ==
It is a ornamental plant because of its bright colour and bloom that lasts very long. It is also used as a cut flower in floral arrangements.
