= Schwenckia aurantiaca =

Scientific classification
- Kingdom: Plantae
- Clade: Embryophytes
- Clade: Tracheophytes
- Clade: Spermatophytes
- Clade: Angiosperms
- Clade: Eudicots
- Clade: Asterids
- Order: Solanales
- Family: Solanaceae
- Genus: Schwenckia
- Species: S. aurantiaca

Binomial name
- Schwenckia aurantiaca Paucar & Stehmann

Species of flowering plant

Schwenckia aurantiaca is a species of flowering plant in the family Solanaceae. It is native to Minas Gerais, Brazil, where it grows primarily in seasonally dry tropical biomes. The species is an annual herb adapted to open habitats in dry tropical environments. The species was first described by botanists Jenny Olga Arrea Paucar and João Renato Stehmann and was published in the journal Phytotaxa in 2021.

== Description ==
Schwenckia aurantiaca is characterized by a cylindrical corolla tube bearing five orange, linear appendages. The androecium consists of two fertile stamens and three unequal pilose staminodes. The calyx is persistent and splits to the base when the fruit develops.
