= Schwenckia lateriflora =

Scientific classification
- Kingdom: Plantae
- Clade: Embryophytes
- Clade: Tracheophytes
- Clade: Spermatophytes
- Clade: Angiosperms
- Clade: Eudicots
- Clade: Asterids
- Order: Solanales
- Family: Solanaceae
- Genus: Schwenckia
- Species: S. lateriflora

Binomial name
- Schwenckia lateriflora (Vahl) Carvalho

Species of flowering plant

Schwenckia lateriflora is a species of flowering plant in the family Solanaceae. It is native to Nicaragua to Costa Rica, Venezuela to Guyana, eastern Bolivia, and eastern Brazil. It grows primarily in wet tropical biomes and is typically found in open vegetation and disturbed habitats in tropical regions of Central and South America. The species was originally described by the Danish botanist Martin Vahl and later placed in the genus Schwenckia by the Brazilian botanist André Maurício Vieira de Carvalho. The accepted name was published in the botanical journal Loefgrenia, issue 37, page 2 (1969).
