= Schwenckia grandiflora =

Scientific classification
- Kingdom: Plantae
- Clade: Embryophytes
- Clade: Tracheophytes
- Clade: Spermatophytes
- Clade: Angiosperms
- Clade: Eudicots
- Clade: Asterids
- Order: Solanales
- Family: Solanaceae
- Genus: Schwenckia
- Species: S. grandiflora

Binomial name
- Schwenckia grandiflora Benth., 1846

Species of flowering plant

Schwenckia grandiflora is a species of flowering plant in the family Solanaceae, commonly known as the nightshade family. It is native to tropical South America, particularly eastern and central regions of Brazil. The species is a climbing shrub that primarily grows in wet tropical biomes and open forest habitats.

The species was first described by the English botanist George Bentham and published in Prodromus Systematis Naturalis Regni Vegetabilis volume 10, page 193, in 1846.

== Description ==
It is one of two climbing subshrubs in the genus Schwenckia, with slender, twining stems. The young branches are green, slightly glossy, and covered with fine hairs. The leaves are arranged alternately along the stem and are attached by short, slightly hairy stalks. They are oblong to heart-shaped, with pointed tips and mostly smooth edges. The upper surface of the leaves is nearly hairless, while the underside is covered with fine hairs, especially along the veins. The flowers are borne in a large, loose, branching cluster. Small, narrow bracts are present at the base of the flower stalks. As suggested by its name, this variety is characterized by its relatively large flowers.
