= Schwenckia juncoides =

Scientific classification
- Kingdom: Plantae
- Clade: Embryophytes
- Clade: Tracheophytes
- Clade: Spermatophytes
- Clade: Angiosperms
- Clade: Eudicots
- Clade: Asterids
- Order: Solanales
- Family: Solanaceae
- Genus: Schwenckia
- Species: S. juncoides

Binomial name
- Schwenckia juncoides Chodat

Species of flowering plant

Schwenckia juncoides is flowering plant in the nightshade family that is native to southern Brazil and Paraguay.

S. juncoides has a smooth, non-twining stem, which can reach 30–40 cm (12–16 in). Its leaves are linear to lanceolate, narrow and grass like to shaped like a spear head. The flowers are longer than 1.6 cm (0.63 in) with a straight tube.

== Taxonomy ==
Schwenckia juncoides was scientifically described in 1916 by Swiss botanist Robert Hippolyte Chodat. It is classified in the genus Schwenckia as part of the Solanaceae family. It has no botanical synonyms or subspecies.

== Range and habitat ==
In Brazil it grows in the central-west in the state of Mato Grosso do Sul and in the south in the state of Paraná. It is also found in Paraguay. It grows in veredas, a type of savanna swamp found in South America in the Pantanal.
