= Schwenckia breviseta =

Scientific classification
- Kingdom: Plantae
- Clade: Embryophytes
- Clade: Tracheophytes
- Clade: Spermatophytes
- Clade: Angiosperms
- Clade: Eudicots
- Clade: Asterids
- Order: Solanales
- Family: Solanaceae
- Genus: Schwenckia
- Species: S. breviseta

Binomial name
- Schwenckia breviseta Casar.

Synonyms
- Schwenkia breviseta Casar; Schwenkia grandiflora Benth.

Species of flowering plant

Schwenckia breviseta is a species of flowering plant in the family Solanaceae, native to southeastern Brazil, primarily the São Paulo region, where it grows as a subshrub in seasonally dry tropical biomes and is adapted to open, dry habitats.

It was first described by the Italian botanist Giovanni Casaretto and published in Novarum Stirpium Brasiliensium Decades in 1842.

== Description ==
Schwenckia breviseta has a branched, finely hairy stem, with widely spreading small branches. Petiolates are ovate to cordate with acuminate and almost hairless leaves, and ovate to lanceolate floral leaves. Peduncles have 1 to 3 flowers. The corollae are three or four times longer than the sepals; and it has oblong appendages that are much longer than the teeth placed between them.

== Taxonomy ==
Similar to other species in the genus, Schwenckia breviseta had a complex taxonomic history in which Schwenckia grandiflora was at times misinterpreted by botanists and incorrectly associated with or confused with Schwenckia breviseta, before later revisions clarified their distinct identities and synonymy relationships.
