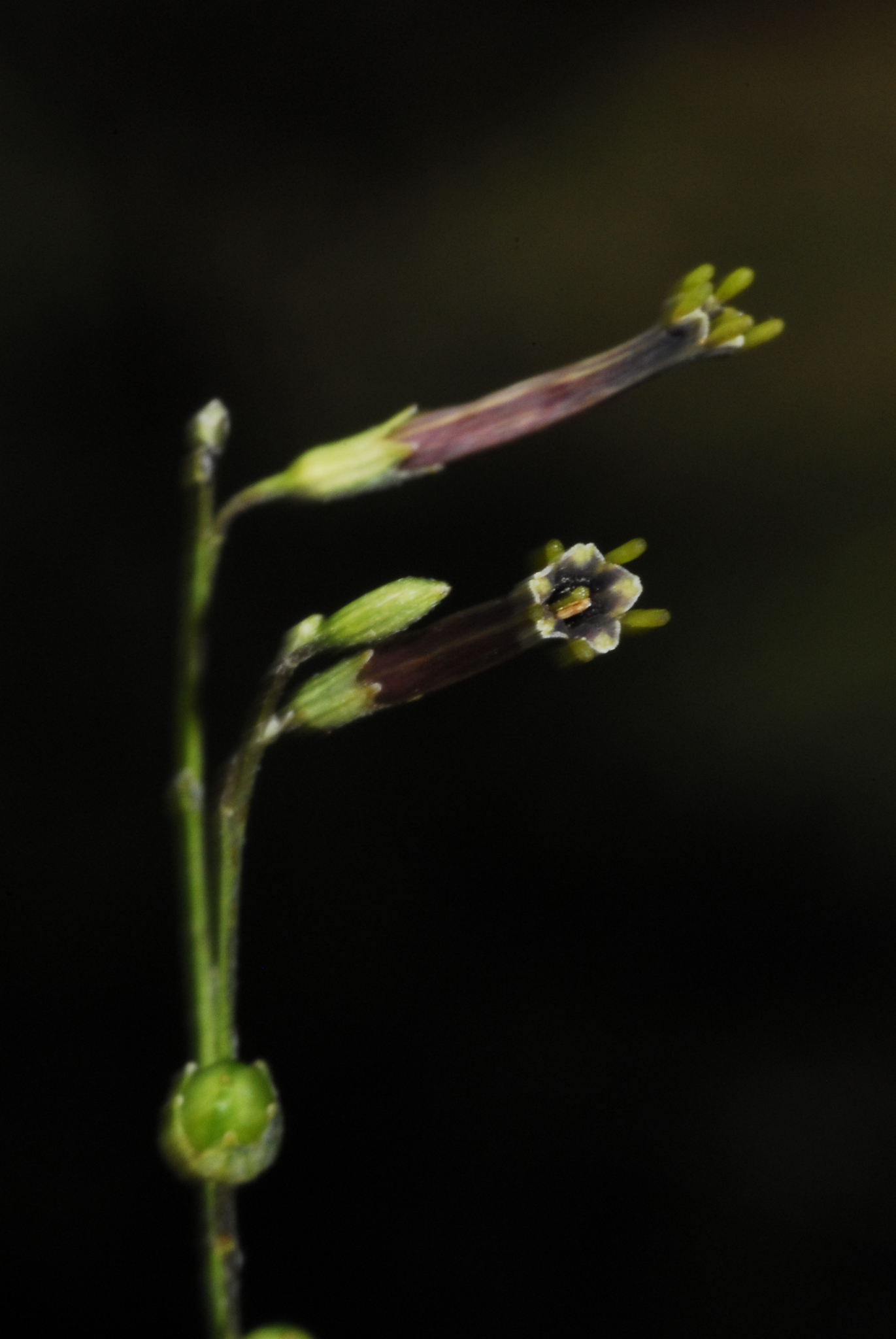

Scientific classification
- Kingdom: Plantae
- Clade: Embryophytes
- Clade: Tracheophytes
- Clade: Spermatophytes
- Clade: Angiosperms
- Clade: Eudicots
- Clade: Asterids
- Order: Solanales
- Family: Solanaceae
- Genus: Schwenckia
- Species: S. angustifolia

Binomial name
- Schwenckia angustifolia Benth.

= Schwenckia angustifolia =

Species of flowering plant

Schwenckia angustifolia is a species of flowering plant in the family Solanaceae. It belongs to the genus Schwenckia, a group of herbaceous plants native mainly to tropical regions of the Americas. S. angustifolia is native to Brazil.

== Habitat ==
It grows in open areas and dry tropical environments.

== Description ==
Schwenckia angustifolia is hairless, featuring stalkless, linear leaves that are narrowed at the base. It has slender, somewhat panicle-like clusters with widely spaced, nearly stalkless flowers. The calyx is 5-toothed, and the corolla teeth are club-shaped and bristle-like, exceeding the lobes of the sinuses by 2 to 3 times.
