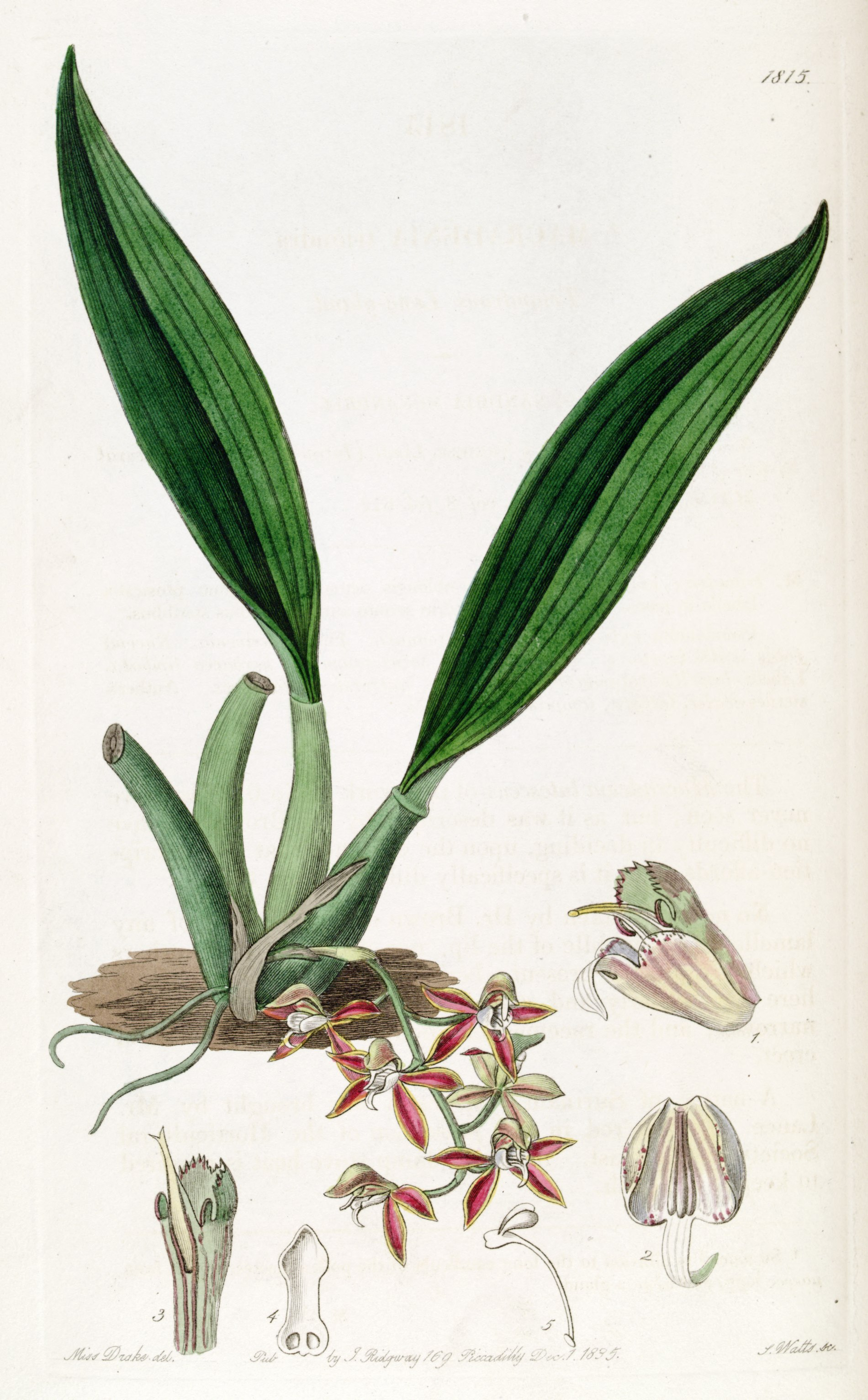

Scientific classification
- Kingdom: Plantae
- Clade: Tracheophytes
- Clade: Angiosperms
- Clade: Monocots
- Order: Asparagales
- Family: Orchidaceae
- Subfamily: Epidendroideae
- Genus: Macradenia
- Species: M. lutescens

Binomial name
- Macradenia lutescens R.Br.

Synonyms
- Macradenia triandra Lindl.; Rhynchadenia cubensis A.Rich. in R.de la Sagra; Macradenia surinamensis Rchb.f. & Wullschl. in W.G.Walpers

= Macradenia lutescens =

Species of orchid

Macradenia lutescens is a species of epiphytic orchid known by the common name longgland orchid. It is native to South America (Brazil, Peru, Ecuador, Colombia, Venezuela, the Guianas), the West Indies (Trinidad, Cuba, Hispaniola, Jamaica, Bahamas), and southern Florida (Miami-Dade County).
