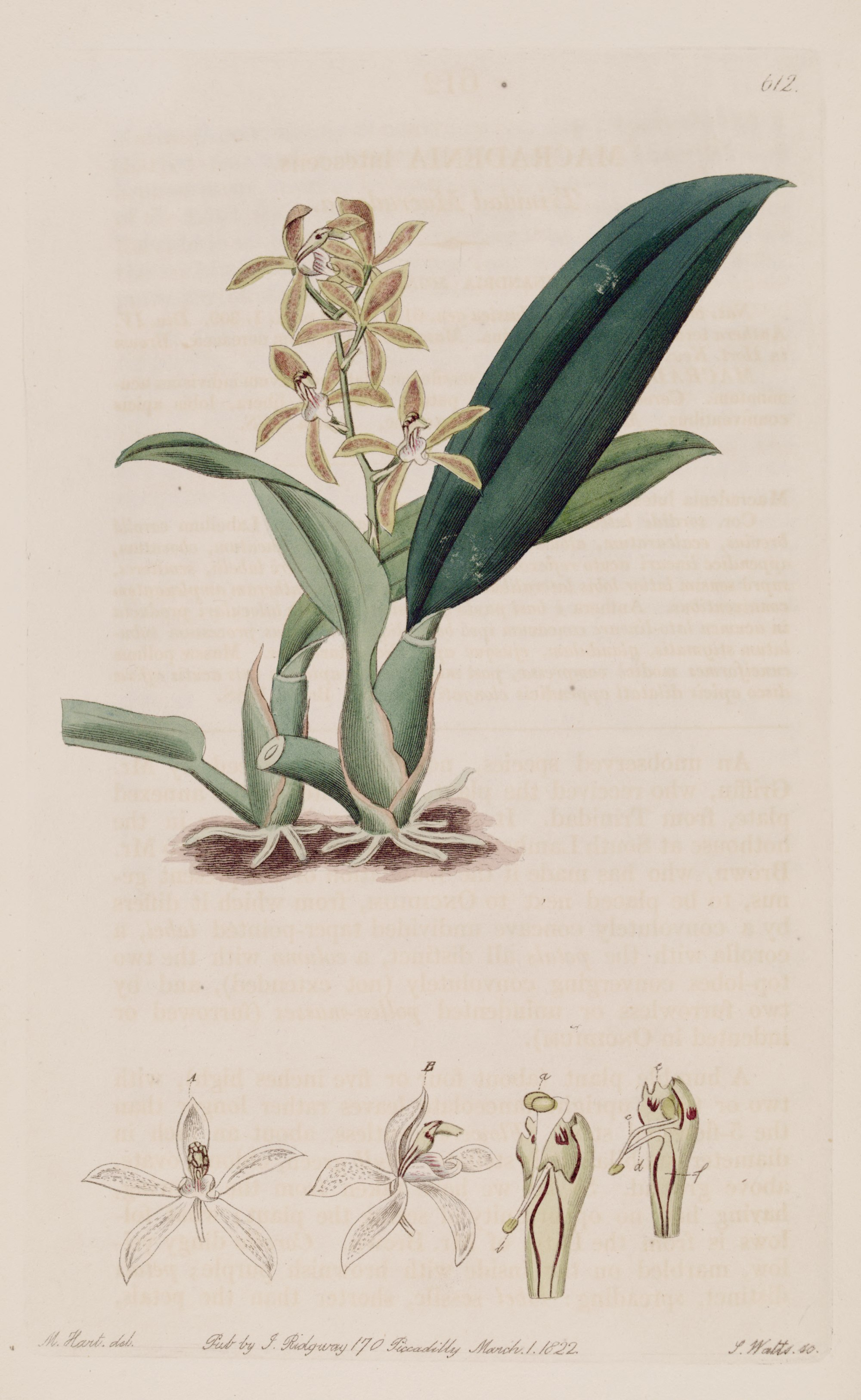
- Macradenia lutescens (Illustration)

Scientific classification
- Kingdom: Plantae
- Clade: Tracheophytes
- Clade: Angiosperms
- Clade: Monocots
- Order: Asparagales
- Family: Orchidaceae
- Subfamily: Epidendroideae
- Tribe: Cymbidieae
- Subtribe: Oncidiinae
- Genus: Macradenia; R.Br.

Synonyms
- Rhynchadenia A.Rich. in R.de la Sagra; Serrastylis Rolfe

= Macradenia =

Genus of orchids

Macradenia is a genus of flowering plants from the orchid family, Orchidaceae. It is native to Latin America, the West Indies and Florida.

1. Macradenia amazonica Mansf. - Brazil
2. Macradenia brassavolae Rchb.f. - southern Mexico, Central America, Colombia, Venezuela, Ecuador
3. Macradenia delicatula Barb.Rodr. - Minas Gerais
4. Macradenia loxoglottis Focke ex Rchb.f. in W.G.Walpers - Suriname
5. Macradenia lutescens R.Br. - Florida, Bahamas, Cuba, Dominican Republic, Jamaica, Trinidad, Venezuela, Colombia, Guyana, Suriname, French Guiana, Brazil, Colombia, Ecuador
6. Macradenia multiflora (Kraenzl.) Cogn. in C.F.P.von Martius - Brazil, Paraguay
7. Macradenia paraensis Barb.Rodr. - Brazil, Paraguay
8. Macradenia paulensis Cogn. in C.F.P.von Martius - Brazil
9. Macradenia purpureorostrata G.Gerlach - Colombia, Venezuela
10. Macradenia regnellii Barb.Rodr. - Minas Gerais
11. Macradenia rubescens Barb.Rodr. - Brazil, Venezuela
12. Macradenia tridentata C.Schweinf. - Peru

== See also ==
- List of Orchidaceae genera
