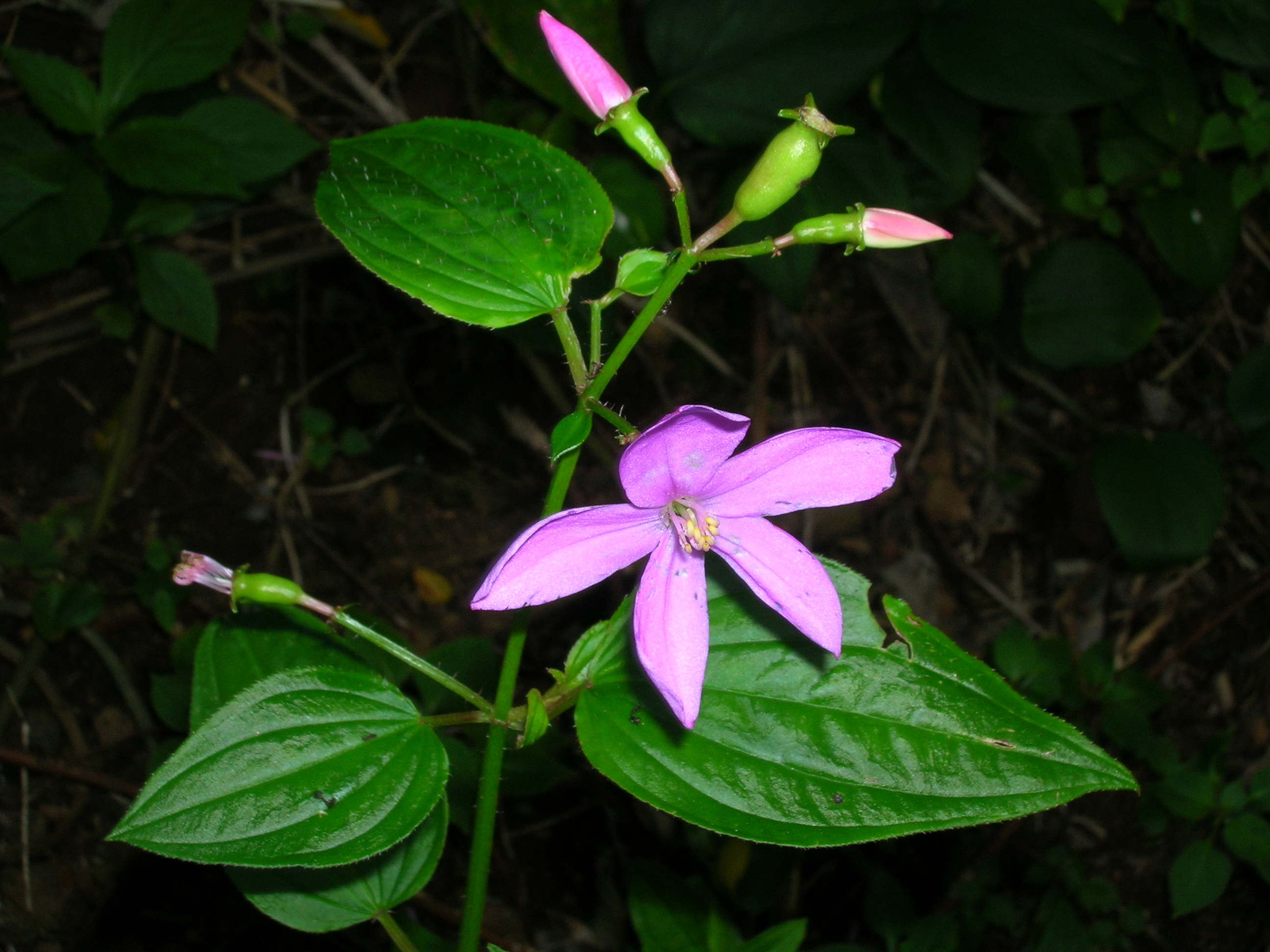
- Arthrostemma ciliatum, with an abbarant flower

Scientific classification
- Kingdom: Plantae
- Clade: Tracheophytes
- Clade: Angiosperms
- Clade: Eudicots
- Clade: Rosids
- Order: Myrtales
- Family: Melastomataceae
- Genus: Arthrostemma; Pav. ex D.Don

= Arthrostemma =

Genus of flowering plants

Arthrostemma is a genus of flowering plants belonging to the family Melastomataceae.

Its native range is Mexico to Tropical America.

Species:

- Arthrostemma alatum Triana
- Arthrostemma ciliatum Pav. ex D.Don
- Arthrostemma cubense A.Rich.
- Arthrostemma parvifolium Cogn.
- Arthrostemma primaevum Almeda
