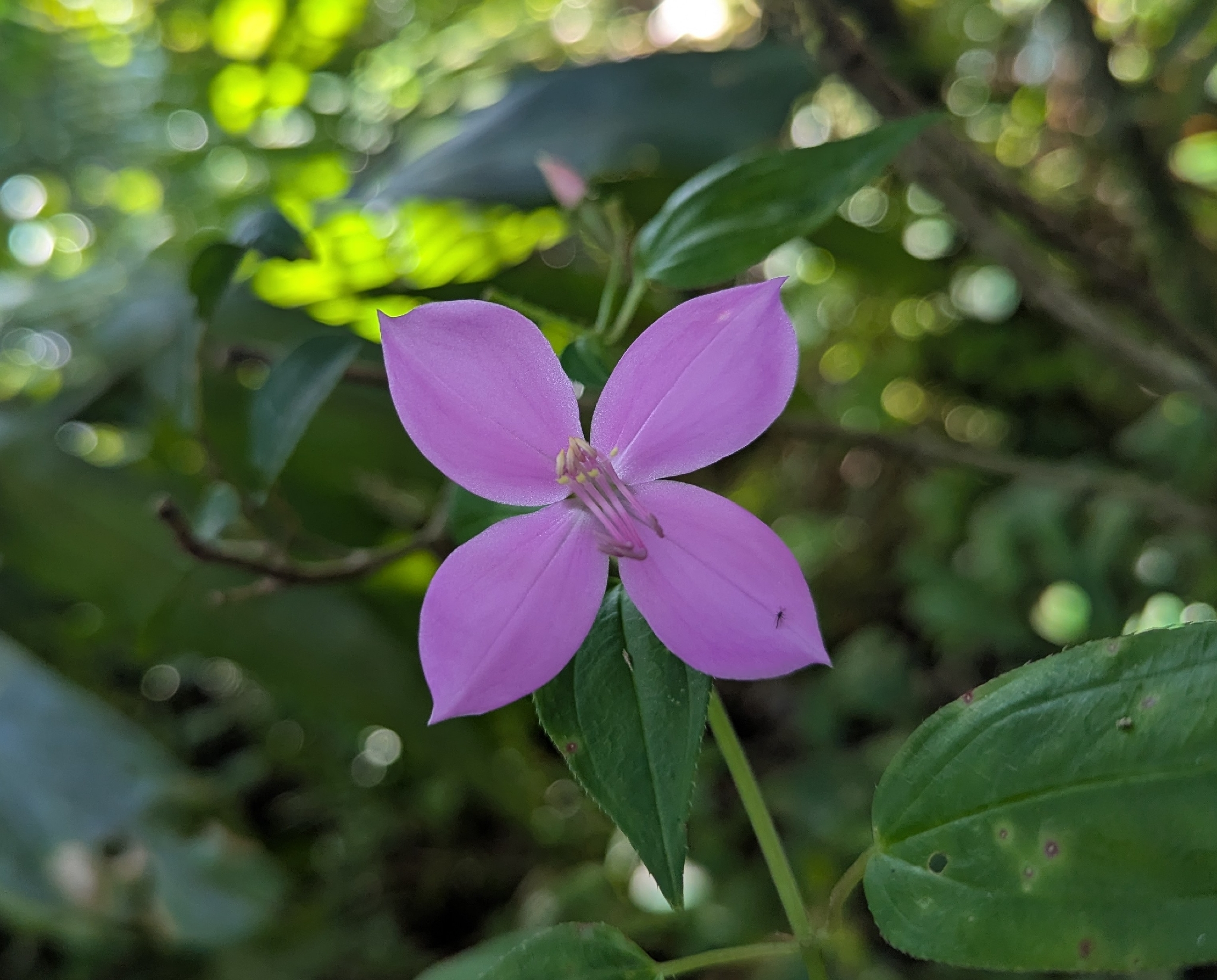

Scientific classification
- Kingdom: Plantae
- Clade: Tracheophytes
- Clade: Angiosperms
- Clade: Eudicots
- Clade: Rosids
- Order: Myrtales
- Family: Melastomataceae
- Genus: Arthrostemma
- Species: A. ciliatum

Binomial name
- Arthrostemma ciliatum Pav. ex D.Don

Synonyms
- Arthrostemma latifolium D. Don

= Arthrostemma ciliatum =

Species of flowering plant

Arthrostemma ciliatum, commonly known as pinkfringe, is a species of flowering plant native to the tropical Americas.

== Description ==
Arthrostemma ciliatum is an herb with a sprawling habit that can extend 1 to 4 metres (3.3 to 13.1 ft). It has reddish stems and red buds that develop into pink or purple flowers with prominent stamens. The leaves are ovate to lanceolate and edged with tiny, bristly-hairy, reddish teeth.

== Ecology ==
The pinkfringe is perennial, and grows aggressively along riverbanks, in humid forests, and in disturbed areas. It can be found at middle elevations from 500 to 1,000 metres (0.31 to 0.62 mi) across the Greater Antilles, Mexico, and Central and South America. The pinkfringe has also naturalized in Hawaii, where it is considered a weed.

== Uses ==
The pinkfringe is a popular ornamental plant. It also has tender, edible stems, which can be used for food. Medicinally, it has been used to treat a variety of conditions, from diabetesto urinary tract infections and sexually transmitted infections.
