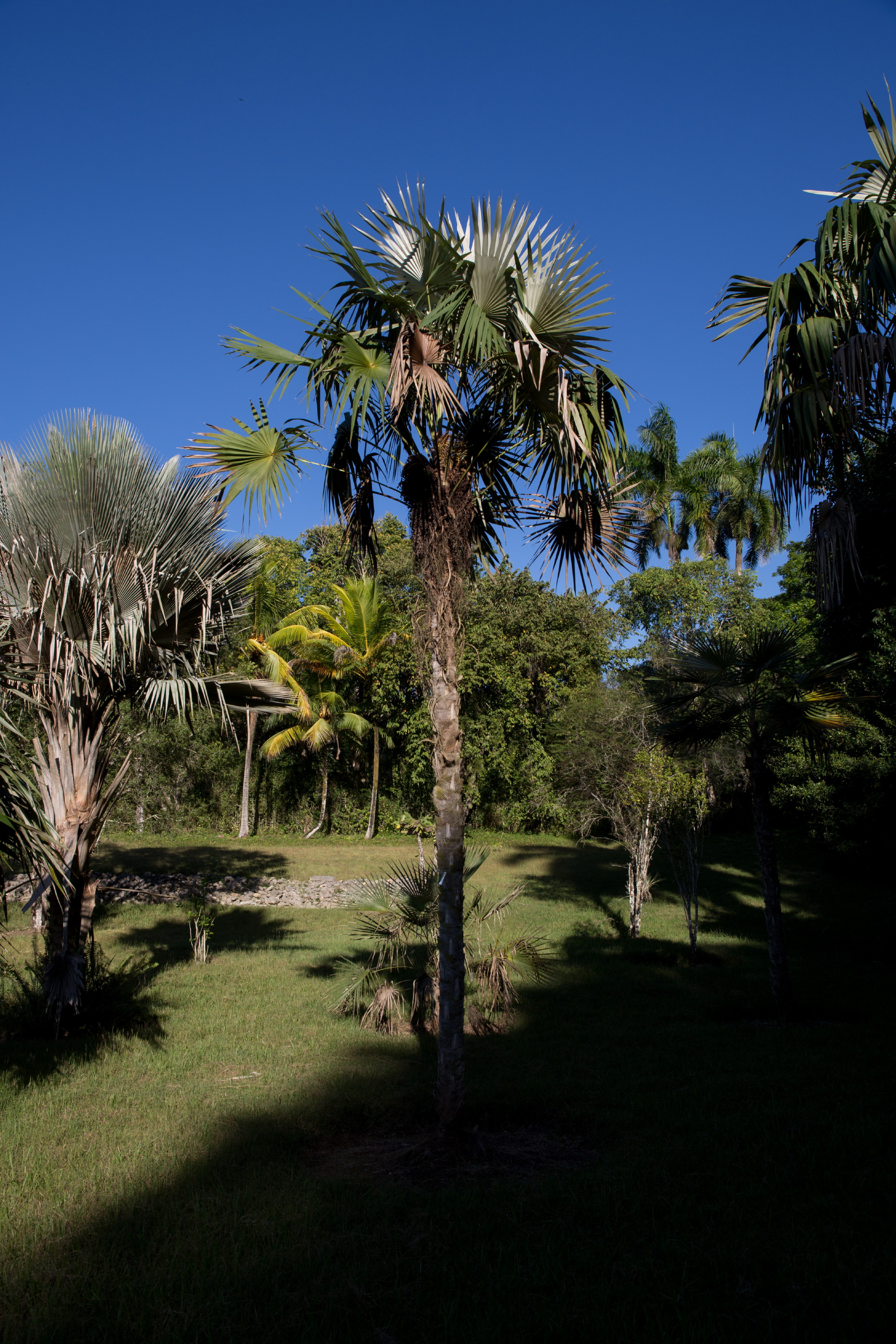

Conservation status
- Critically Endangered (IUCN 3.1)

Scientific classification
- Kingdom: Plantae
- Clade: Embryophytes
- Clade: Tracheophytes
- Clade: Spermatophytes
- Clade: Angiosperms
- Clade: Monocots
- Clade: Commelinids
- Order: Arecales
- Family: Arecaceae
- Genus: Coccothrinax
- Species: C. victorinii

Binomial name
- Coccothrinax victorinii León

= Coccothrinax victorinii =

Species of palm

Coccothrinax victorinii is a species of flowering plant in the palm family, Arecaceae. It is endemic to eastern Cuba.

Henderson and colleagues consider Coccothrinax inaguensis to be a possible conspecific with this species. If that is the case, the older name, Coccothrinax victorinii would replace the better known C. inaguensis.
