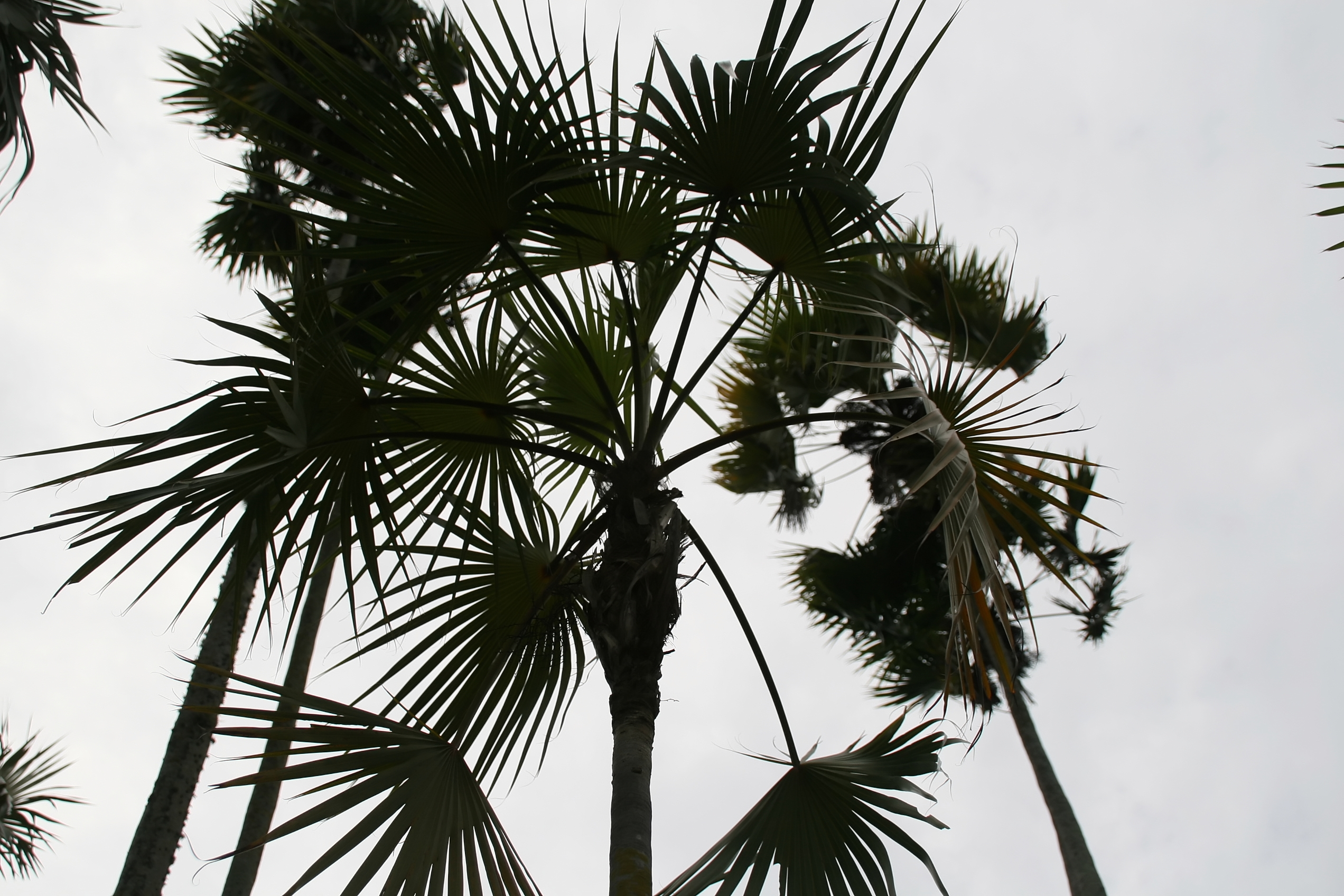
- tree

Conservation status
- Near Threatened (IUCN 3.1)

Scientific classification
- Kingdom: Plantae
- Clade: Tracheophytes
- Clade: Angiosperms
- Clade: Monocots
- Clade: Commelinids
- Order: Arecales
- Family: Arecaceae
- Genus: Coccothrinax
- Species: C. inaguensis

Binomial name
- Coccothrinax inaguensis Read

= Coccothrinax inaguensis =

Species of palm

Coccothrinax inaguensis, the thatch palm or Inagua silver palm, is a palm which is endemic to the Bahamas and the Turks and Caicos Islands.

Henderson and colleagues also considered Coccothrinax victorinii to be a possible conspecific. If that is the case, the name C. victorini should be applied to the combined species, since that name was the first to be published.

== Description ==
This palm species develops a slender trunk with a smooth, grey surface and can reach heights of up to 6 m. The foliage consists of palmate leaves borne on elongated, narrow petioles. The leaf blades are firm and distinctly umbrella-like in shape, with a glossy green upper surface and a silvery-toned underside.

At the base of each leaf, a double-layered sheath composed of tightly interwoven fibrous strands extends upward beyond the petiole. The inflorescences emerge from this sheath and hang in pendent clusters that curve downward beneath the crown of leaves.

The flowers display yellow to straw-colored outer petals and associated floral bracts, while the ovaries are yellowish-green. The fruits are small, rounded, and berry-like, developing on short stalks and turning red, purple, or nearly black upon ripening.
