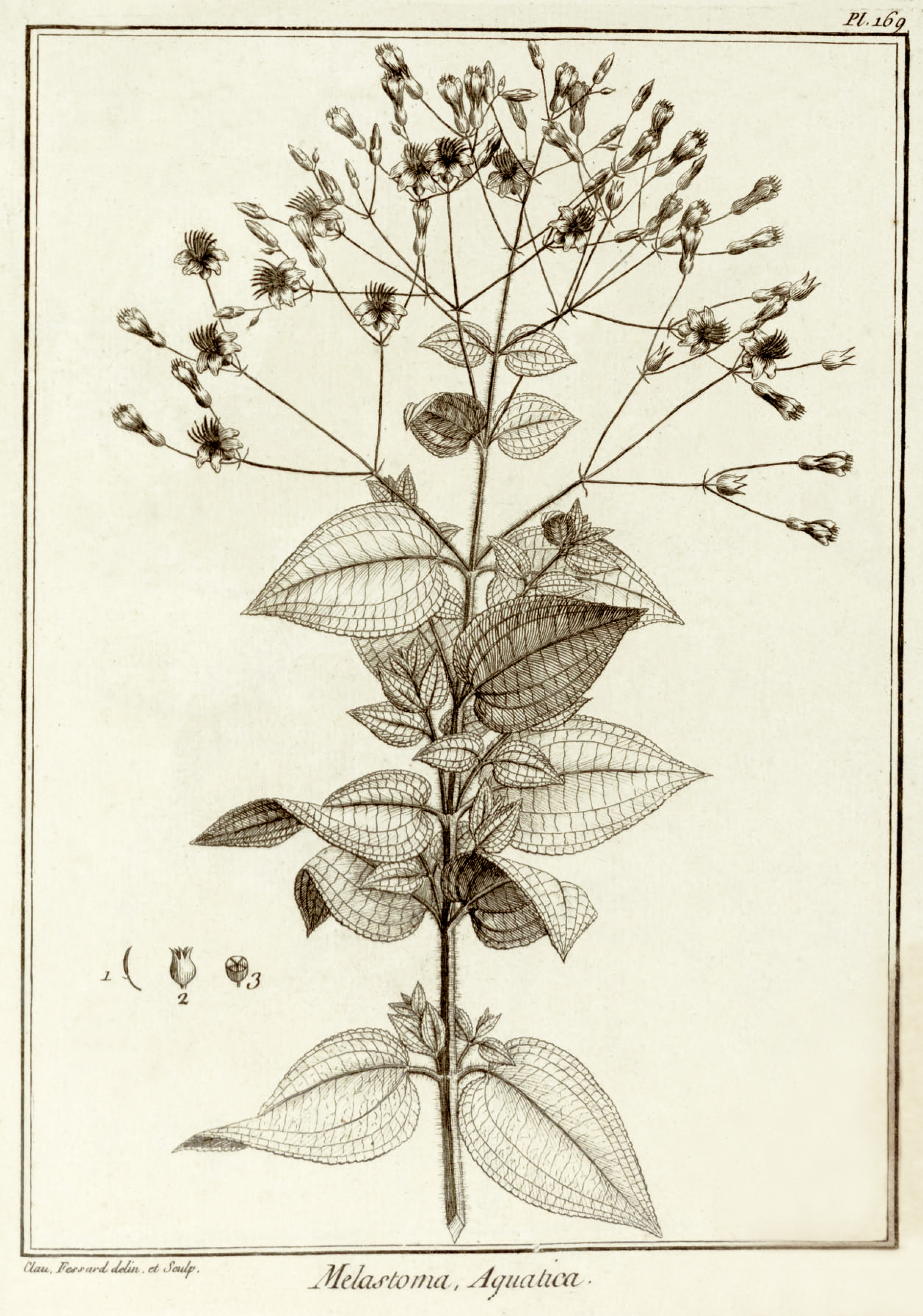

Scientific classification
- Kingdom: Plantae
- Clade: Tracheophytes
- Clade: Angiosperms
- Clade: Eudicots
- Clade: Rosids
- Order: Myrtales
- Family: Melastomataceae
- Genus: Nepsera; Naudin
- Species: N. aquatica

Binomial name
- Nepsera aquatica Naudin

Synonyms
- Synonyms: Aciotis aquatica G.Don; Aciotis sieberi Triana; Homonoma aridum Bello; Melastoma aquaticum Aubl.; Rhexia aquatica Sw.; Spennera aquatica Mart. ex DC.; Spennera asphalti Crueg.; Spennera hydrophila Miq.; Spennera sieberi Steud.; Tibouchina aquatica M.Gómez; Xeracina aquatica Raf.

= Nepsera =

Species of flowering plant

Nepsera is a monotypic genus of flowering plants belonging to the family Melastomataceae. The only species is Nepsera aquatica.

Its native range is Tropical America. It is found in the countries of Belize, Brazil, Colombia, Costa Rica, Cuba, Dominican Republic, Ecuador, French Guiana, Guatemala, Guyana, Haiti, Honduras, Jamaica, the Leeward Islands, Nicaragua, Panamá, Puerto Rico, Suriname, Trinidad-Tobago, Venezuela and the Windward Islands.

The genus name of Nepsera is in honour of Fridolin Karl Leopold Spenner (1798–1841), a German doctor and botanist. He was also director of the university botanical garden in Freiburg and professor of medical botany. The genus has a synonym, Homonoma Bello. The Latin specific epithet of aquatica which is derived from "aquaticus" meaning in water. Both genus and species were first described and published in Ann. Sci. Nat., Bot., sér. 3, 13: 28 (1850.
