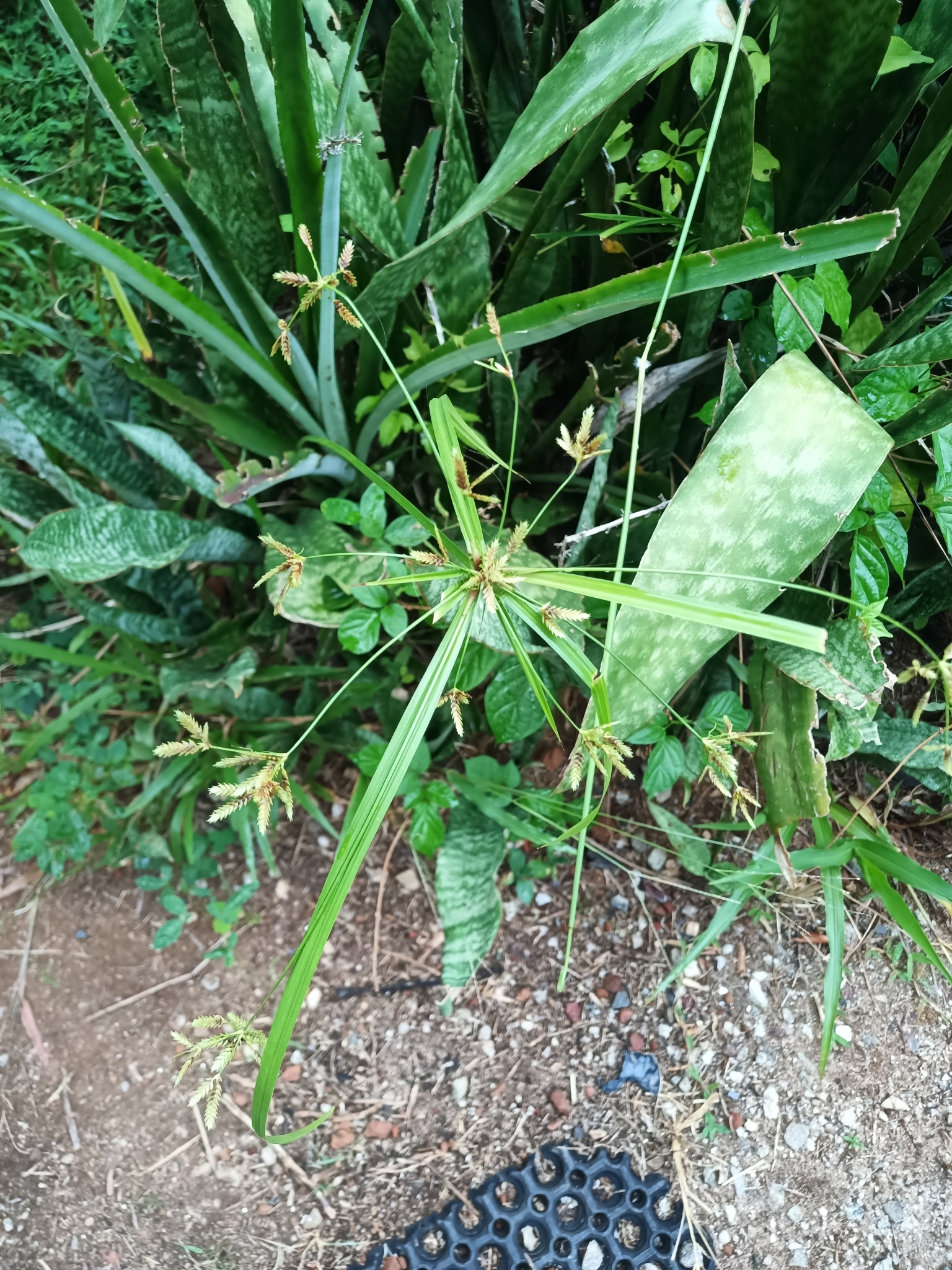

Scientific classification
- Kingdom: Plantae
- Clade: Tracheophytes
- Clade: Angiosperms
- Clade: Monocots
- Clade: Commelinids
- Order: Poales
- Family: Cyperaceae
- Genus: Cyperus
- Species: C. laxus

Binomial name
- Cyperus laxus Lam., Tab. Encycl. 1: 146. 1791.

= Cyperus laxus =

Species of plant

Cyperus laxus is a sedge species in the Cyperaceae. It is native to tropical regions of the Western Hemisphere (from central Mexico and the West Indies south to Argentina) and also to Africa (from Liberia to Zimbabwe and Tanzania). The species is reportedly naturalized in Assam and the Andaman and Nicobar Islands.

== Subspecies ==
Three subspecies are recognized:

1. Cyperus laxus subsp. buchholzii (Boeckeler) Lye - western and central Africa
2. Cyperus laxus subsp. laxus - Western Hemisphere; naturalized in India
3. Cyperus laxus subsp. sylvestris (Ridl.) Lye - Tanzania, Uganda, Zimbabwe

== See also ==
- List of Cyperus species
