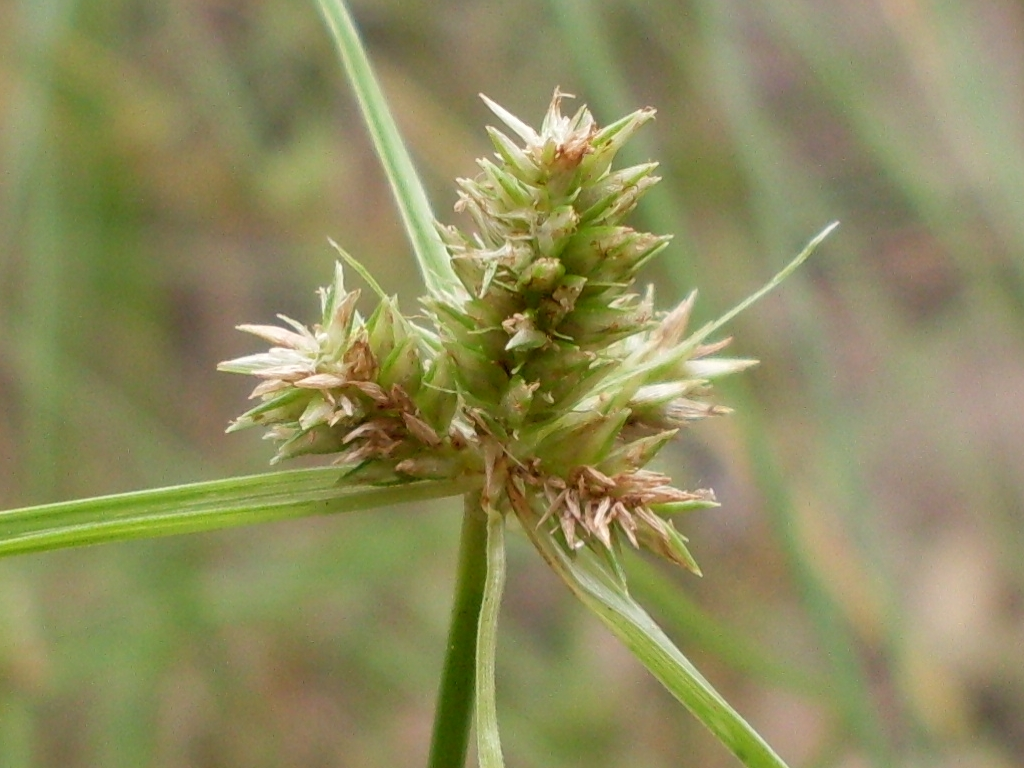

Scientific classification
- Kingdom: Plantae
- Clade: Tracheophytes
- Clade: Angiosperms
- Clade: Monocots
- Clade: Commelinids
- Order: Poales
- Family: Cyperaceae
- Genus: Cyperus
- Species: C. aggregatus

Binomial name
- Cyperus aggregatus (Willd.) Endl.

= Cyperus aggregatus =

Species of sedge

Cyperus aggregatus, commonly known as the inflatedscale flatsedge, is a species of sedge that is native to tropical and subtropical regions of the Americas.

== See also ==
- List of Cyperus species
