= Salvia serotina =

Scientific classification
- Kingdom: Plantae
- Clade: Tracheophytes
- Clade: Angiosperms
- Clade: Eudicots
- Clade: Asterids
- Order: Lamiales
- Family: Lamiaceae
- Genus: Salvia
- Species: S. serotina

Binomial name
- Salvia serotina L.

Species of flowering plant

Salvia serotina (Littlewoman) is a herbaceous annual that is native to Florida, Bermuda, the West Indies, and Mexico south through Panama, growing on moist ground and as a weed in cultivated fields. It is a trailing or bushy plant reaching 18 in (46 cm) tall, with aromatic broadly ovate leaves that have scalloped edges, 0.5 to 1.5 in (1.3 to 3.8 cm) long and 0.375 to 0.75 in (0.95 to 1.91 cm) wide. The flowers are blue and white.
