= Cyperus humilis =

Scientific classification
- Kingdom: Plantae
- Clade: Tracheophytes
- Clade: Angiosperms
- Clade: Monocots
- Clade: Commelinids
- Order: Poales
- Family: Cyperaceae
- Genus: Cyperus
- Species: C. humilis

Binomial name
- Cyperus humilis Kunth

Species of plant native to the Americas

Cyperus humilis is a species of sedge that is native to southern parts of North America, Central America and northern parts of South America.

The species was first formally described by the botanist Carl Sigismund Kunth in 1837.

== See also ==
- List of Cyperus species
