= Asciadium =

Scientific classification
- Kingdom: Plantae
- Clade: Tracheophytes
- Clade: Angiosperms
- Clade: Eudicots
- Clade: Asterids
- Order: Apiales
- Family: Apiaceae
- Genus: Asciadium; Griseb.
- Species: A. coronopifolium

Binomial name
- Asciadium coronopifolium Griseb.

Synonyms
- Asciadum Griseb., orth. var.

Genus of flowering plants

Asciadium is a genus of flowering plants in the family Apiaceae. Its only species is Asciadium coronopifolium, native to Cuba.
