= Cyperus nanus =

Scientific classification
- Kingdom: Plantae
- Clade: Tracheophytes
- Clade: Angiosperms
- Clade: Monocots
- Clade: Commelinids
- Order: Poales
- Family: Cyperaceae
- Genus: Cyperus
- Species: C. nanus

Binomial name
- Cyperus nanus Willd., 1797

Species of sedge

Cyperus nanus, commonly known as the Indian flatsedge, is a species of sedge that is native to eastern parts of Mexico and islands of the Caribbean.

== See also ==
- List of Cyperus species
