= Wagneria vernata =

Scientific classification
- Kingdom: Animalia
- Phylum: Arthropoda
- Class: Insecta
- Order: Diptera
- Family: Tachinidae
- Subfamily: Dexiinae
- Tribe: Voriini
- Genus: Wagneria
- Species: W. vernata

Binomial name
- Wagneria vernata West, 1925

Species of fly

Wagneria vernata is a species of fly in the family Tachinidae.

== Distribution ==
Canada, United States.
