= Halydaia mackerrasi =

Scientific classification
- Kingdom: Animalia
- Phylum: Arthropoda
- Clade: Pancrustacea
- Class: Insecta
- Order: Diptera
- Family: Tachinidae
- Subfamily: Dexiinae
- Tribe: Voriini
- Genus: Halydaia
- Species: H. mackerrasi

Binomial name
- Halydaia mackerrasi Paramonov, 1960

Species of fly

Halydaia mackerrasi is a species of fly in the family Tachinidae.

== Distribution ==
Australia.
