= Hypovoria discalis =

Scientific classification
- Kingdom: Animalia
- Phylum: Arthropoda
- Class: Insecta
- Order: Diptera
- Family: Tachinidae
- Subfamily: Dexiinae
- Tribe: Voriini
- Genus: Hypovoria
- Species: H. discalis

Binomial name
- Hypovoria discalis (Brooks, 1945)

Synonyms
- Catalinovoria discalis Brooks, 1945; Proselenus mirificus Reinhard, 1964

Species of fly

Hypovoria discalis is a species of fly in the family Tachinidae.

== Distribution ==
Canada, United States, Mexico.
