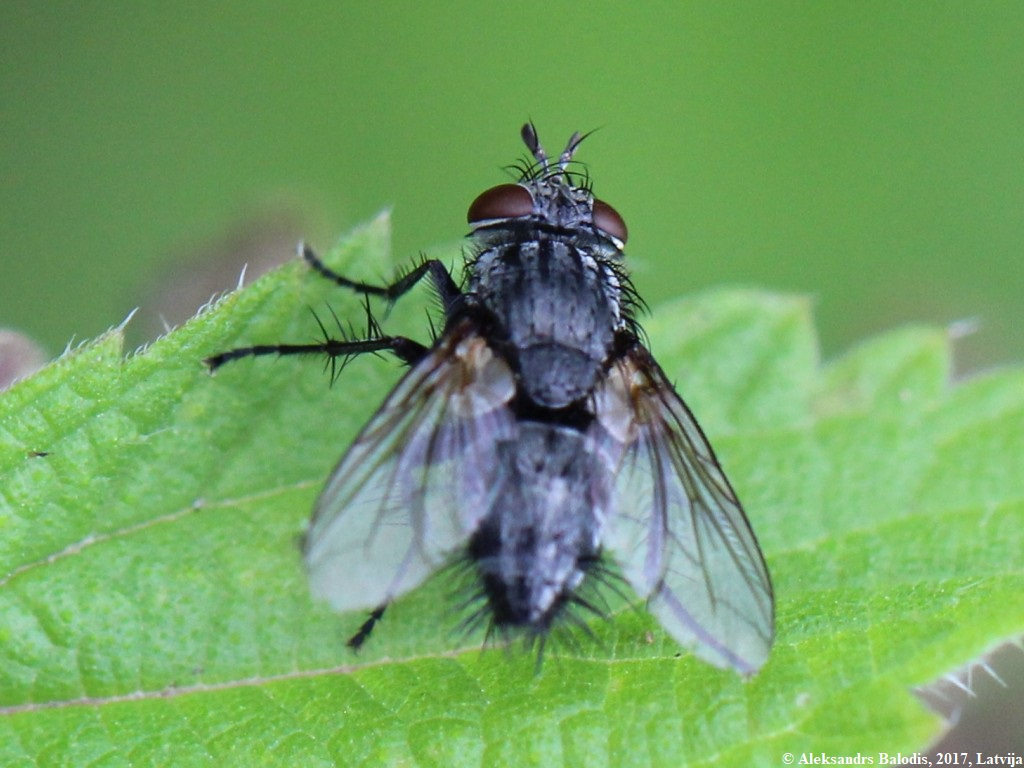

Scientific classification
- Kingdom: Animalia
- Phylum: Arthropoda
- Class: Insecta
- Order: Diptera
- Family: Tachinidae
- Subfamily: Dexiinae
- Tribe: Voriini
- Genus: Hypovoria
- Species: H. hilaris

Binomial name
- Hypovoria hilaris Villeneuve, 1913

Synonyms
- Voria (Hypovoria) hilaris Villeneuve, 1913

= Hypovoria hilaris =

Species of fly

Hypovoria hilaris is a species of fly in the family Tachinidae.

== Distribution ==
Central Asia, Denmark, Cyprus, Greece, Italy, Portugal, Spain, Turkey, France, Iran, Israel, Palestine, Mongolia, Canary Islands, Egypt, Morocco, Tunisia, Russia, Armenia, Azerbaijan, China.
