= Muscopteryx chaetosula =

Scientific classification
- Kingdom: Animalia
- Phylum: Arthropoda
- Class: Insecta
- Order: Diptera
- Family: Tachinidae
- Subfamily: Dexiinae
- Tribe: Voriini
- Genus: Muscopteryx
- Species: M. chaetosula

Binomial name
- Muscopteryx chaetosula Townsend, 1892

Synonyms
- Brachycoma pulverea Coquillett, 1897

Species of fly

Muscopteryx chaetosula is a species of fly in the family Tachinidae.

== Distribution ==
Canada, United States, Mexico.
