= Euptilopareia vicinalis =

Scientific classification
- Kingdom: Animalia
- Phylum: Arthropoda
- Class: Insecta
- Order: Diptera
- Family: Tachinidae
- Subfamily: Dexiinae
- Tribe: Voriini
- Genus: Euptilopareia
- Species: E. vicinalis

Binomial name
- Euptilopareia vicinalis Reinhard, 1956

Species of fly

Euptilopareia vicinalis is a species of fly in the family Tachinidae.

== Distribution ==
Canada, United States.
