= Engeddia multisetosa =

Scientific classification
- Kingdom: Animalia
- Phylum: Arthropoda
- Class: Insecta
- Order: Diptera
- Family: Tachinidae
- Subfamily: Dexiinae
- Tribe: Voriini
- Genus: Engeddia
- Species: E. multisetosa

Binomial name
- Engeddia multisetosa Kugler, 1977

Species of fly

Engeddia multisetosa is a species of fly in the family Tachinidae.

== Distribution ==
Israel, Spain.
