= Stomina iners =

Scientific classification
- Kingdom: Animalia
- Phylum: Arthropoda
- Class: Insecta
- Order: Diptera
- Family: Tachinidae
- Subfamily: Dexiinae
- Tribe: Voriini
- Genus: Stomina
- Species: S. iners

Binomial name
- Stomina iners (Meigen, 1838)

Synonyms
- Tachina iners Meigen, 1838

Species of fly

Stomina iners is a species of fly in the family Tachinidae.

== Distribution ==
Czech Republic, Hungary, Romania, Slovakia, Ukraine, Albania, Bulgaria, Greece, Portugal, Spain, Turkey, France, Iran, Israel, Palestine, Russia.
