= Elfriedella amoena =

Scientific classification
- Kingdom: Animalia
- Phylum: Arthropoda
- Class: Insecta
- Order: Diptera
- Family: Tachinidae
- Subfamily: Dexiinae
- Tribe: Voriini
- Genus: Elfriedella
- Species: E. amoena

Binomial name
- Elfriedella amoena Mesnil, 1957

Species of fly

Elfriedella amoena is a species of fly in the family Tachinidae.

== Distribution ==
Japan, China.
