= Doliolomyia thessa =

Scientific classification
- Kingdom: Animalia
- Phylum: Arthropoda
- Class: Insecta
- Order: Diptera
- Family: Tachinidae
- Subfamily: Dexiinae
- Tribe: Voriini
- Genus: Doliolomyia
- Species: D. thessa

Binomial name
- Doliolomyia thessa Reinhard, 1975

Species of fly

Doliolomyia thessa is a species of fly in the family Tachinidae.

== Distribution ==
Mexico.
