= Dexiomimops rufipes =

Scientific classification
- Kingdom: Animalia
- Phylum: Arthropoda
- Class: Insecta
- Order: Diptera
- Family: Tachinidae
- Subfamily: Dexiinae
- Tribe: Voriini
- Genus: Dexiomimops
- Species: D. rufipes

Binomial name
- Dexiomimops rufipes Baranov, 1935

Species of fly

Dexiomimops rufipes is a species of fly in the family Tachinidae.

== Distribution ==
Myanmar, Taiwan, China, Russia, Japan, India.
