= Hyleorus elatus =

Scientific classification
- Kingdom: Animalia
- Phylum: Arthropoda
- Class: Insecta
- Order: Diptera
- Family: Tachinidae
- Subfamily: Dexiinae
- Tribe: Voriini
- Genus: Hyleorus
- Species: H. elatus

Binomial name
- Hyleorus elatus (Meigen, 1838)

Synonyms
- Plagia aurifluae Wulp, 1869; Plagia elata Meigen, 1838; Tachina setosus Brischke, 1885

Species of fly

Hyleorus elatus is a species of fly in the family Tachinidae.

== Distribution ==
Czech Republic, Lithuania, Poland, Romania, Ukraine, Bulgaria, Italy, Portugal, Austria, Belgium, France, Germany, Netherlands, Switzerland, Japan, Kazakhstan, North Korea, South Korea, Russia, China.
