= Feriola angustifrons =

Scientific classification
- Kingdom: Animalia
- Phylum: Arthropoda
- Class: Insecta
- Order: Diptera
- Family: Tachinidae
- Subfamily: Dexiinae
- Tribe: Voriini
- Genus: Feriola
- Species: F. angustifrons

Binomial name
- Feriola angustifrons Shima, 1988

Species of fly

Feriola angustifrons is a species of fly in the family Tachinidae.

== Distribution ==
Taiwan.
