= Spathidexia clemonsi =

Scientific classification
- Kingdom: Animalia
- Phylum: Arthropoda
- Class: Insecta
- Order: Diptera
- Family: Tachinidae
- Subfamily: Dexiinae
- Tribe: Voriini
- Genus: Spathidexia
- Species: S. clemonsi

Binomial name
- Spathidexia clemonsi Townsend, 1912

Species of fly

Spathidexia clemonsi is a species of fly in the family Tachinidae.

== Distribution ==
Canada, United States.
