= Myioclura melusina =

Scientific classification
- Kingdom: Animalia
- Phylum: Arthropoda
- Class: Insecta
- Order: Diptera
- Family: Tachinidae
- Subfamily: Dexiinae
- Tribe: Voriini
- Genus: Myioclura
- Species: M. melusina

Binomial name
- Myioclura melusina Reinhard, 1975

Species of fly

Myioclura melusina is a species of fly in the family Tachinidae.

== Distribution ==
Mexico.
