= Prosopochaeta setosa =

Scientific classification
- Kingdom: Animalia
- Phylum: Arthropoda
- Clade: Pancrustacea
- Class: Insecta
- Order: Diptera
- Family: Tachinidae
- Subfamily: Dexiinae
- Tribe: Voriini
- Genus: Prosopochaeta
- Species: P. setosa

Binomial name
- Prosopochaeta setosa (Townsend, 1915)

Synonyms
- Punaclista setosa Townsend, 1915

Species of fly

Prosopochaeta setosa is a species of fly in the family Tachinidae.

== Distribution ==
Peru.
