= Actinochaetopteryx actifera =

Scientific classification
- Kingdom: Animalia
- Phylum: Arthropoda
- Clade: Pancrustacea
- Class: Insecta
- Order: Diptera
- Family: Tachinidae
- Subfamily: Dexiinae
- Tribe: Voriini
- Genus: Actinochaetopteryx
- Species: A. actifera

Binomial name
- Actinochaetopteryx actifera Townsend, 1927

Species of fly

Actinochaetopteryx actifera is a species of fly in the family Tachinidae.

== Distribution ==
A. actifera is found in China and Taiwan.
