= Muscopteryx costalis =

Scientific classification
- Kingdom: Animalia
- Phylum: Arthropoda
- Class: Insecta
- Order: Diptera
- Family: Tachinidae
- Subfamily: Dexiinae
- Tribe: Voriini
- Genus: Muscopteryx
- Species: M. costalis

Binomial name
- Muscopteryx costalis (Coquillett, 1897)

Synonyms
- Tricogena costalis Coquillett, 1897

Species of fly

Muscopteryx costalis is a species of fly in the family Tachinidae.

== Distribution ==
United States.
