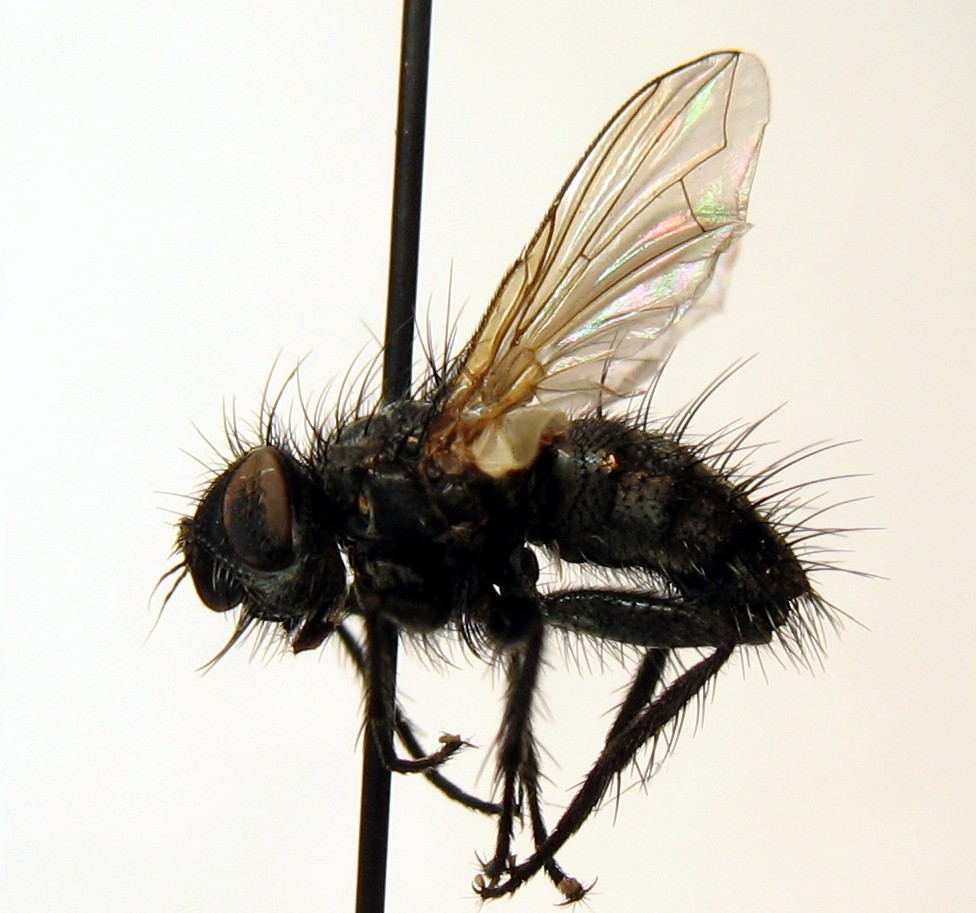

Scientific classification
- Kingdom: Animalia
- Phylum: Arthropoda
- Class: Insecta
- Order: Diptera
- Family: Tachinidae
- Subfamily: Dexiinae
- Tribe: Voriini
- Genus: Blepharomyia
- Species: B. pagana

Binomial name
- Blepharomyia pagana (Meigen, 1824)

Synonyms
- Phorocera incerta Meade, 1897; Tachina amplicornis Zetterstedt, 1844; Tachina duplinervis Zetterstedt, 1844; Tachina pagana Meigen, 1824

= Blepharomyia pagana =

Species of fly

Blepharomyia pagana is a species of fly in the family Tachinidae.

== Distribution ==
Austria, Belarus, Belgium, Bulgaria, Czech Republic, Denmark, Finland, France, Germany, Greece, Hungary, Italy, Lithuania, Netherlands, Norway, Poland, Russia, Slovakia, Spain, Sweden, Switzerland, Ukraine and United Kingdom
