= Xanthodexia semipicta =

Scientific classification
- Kingdom: Animalia
- Phylum: Arthropoda
- Class: Insecta
- Order: Diptera
- Family: Tachinidae
- Subfamily: Dexiinae
- Tribe: Voriini
- Genus: Xanthodexia
- Species: X. semipicta

Binomial name
- Xanthodexia semipicta (Walker, 1853)

Synonyms
- Dexia extrema Walker, 1858; Dexia semipicta Walker, 1853; Dexia suffusa Walker, 1853

Species of fly

Xanthodexia semipicta is a species of fly in the family Tachinidae.

== Distribution ==
Brazil, Trinidad and Tobago.
