= Actinochaetopteryx japonica =

Scientific classification
- Kingdom: Animalia
- Phylum: Arthropoda
- Class: Insecta
- Order: Diptera
- Family: Tachinidae
- Subfamily: Dexiinae
- Tribe: Voriini
- Genus: Actinochaetopteryx
- Species: A. japonica

Binomial name
- Actinochaetopteryx japonica Mesnil, 1970

Species of fly

Actinochaetopteryx japonica is a species of fly in the family Tachinidae. The species is found in Japan, Russia, and Taiwan.
