= Actinochaetopteryx patellipalpis =

Scientific classification
- Kingdom: Animalia
- Phylum: Arthropoda
- Class: Insecta
- Order: Diptera
- Family: Tachinidae
- Subfamily: Dexiinae
- Tribe: Voriini
- Genus: Actinochaetopteryx
- Species: A. patellipalpis

Binomial name
- Actinochaetopteryx patellipalpis Richter, 1986

Species of fly

Actinochaetopteryx patellipalpis is a species of fly in the family Tachinidae.

== Distribution ==
Russia.
