= Blepharomyia angustifrons =

Scientific classification
- Kingdom: Animalia
- Phylum: Arthropoda
- Class: Insecta
- Order: Diptera
- Family: Tachinidae
- Subfamily: Dexiinae
- Tribe: Voriini
- Genus: Blepharomyia
- Species: B. angustifrons

Binomial name
- Blepharomyia angustifrons Herting, 1971

Species of fly

Blepharomyia angustifrons is a species of fly in the family Tachinidae.

== Distribution ==
Austria, Czech Republic, Germany, Netherlands, Poland, Slovakia, Sweden and Switzerland
