= Goniochaeta fuscibasis =

Scientific classification
- Kingdom: Animalia
- Phylum: Arthropoda
- Class: Insecta
- Order: Diptera
- Family: Tachinidae
- Subfamily: Dexiinae
- Tribe: Voriini
- Genus: Goniochaeta
- Species: G. fuscibasis

Binomial name
- Goniochaeta fuscibasis Aldrich, 1926

Species of fly

Goniochaeta fuscibasis is a species of fly in the family Tachinidae.

== Distribution ==
United States
