= Stomina angustifrons =

Scientific classification
- Kingdom: Animalia
- Phylum: Arthropoda
- Class: Insecta
- Order: Diptera
- Family: Tachinidae
- Subfamily: Dexiinae
- Tribe: Voriini
- Genus: Stomina
- Species: S. angustifrons

Binomial name
- Stomina angustifrons Kugler, 1968

Species of fly

Stomina angustifrons is a species of fly in the family Tachinidae.

== Distribution ==
Turkey, Israel, Algeria, China.
