= Feriola longicornis =

Scientific classification
- Kingdom: Animalia
- Phylum: Arthropoda
- Clade: Pancrustacea
- Class: Insecta
- Order: Diptera
- Family: Tachinidae
- Subfamily: Dexiinae
- Tribe: Voriini
- Genus: Feriola
- Species: F. longicornis

Binomial name
- Feriola longicornis Mesnil, 1957

Species of fly

Feriola longicornis is a species of fly in the family Tachinidae.

== Distribution ==
China, Myanmar.
