= Euptilopareia erucicola =

Scientific classification
- Kingdom: Animalia
- Phylum: Arthropoda
- Class: Insecta
- Order: Diptera
- Family: Tachinidae
- Subfamily: Dexiinae
- Tribe: Voriini
- Genus: Euptilopareia
- Species: E. erucicola

Binomial name
- Euptilopareia erucicola (Coquillett, 1897)

Synonyms
- Paraplagia erucicola Coquillett, 1897

Species of fly

Euptilopareia erucicola is a species of fly in the family Tachinidae.

== Distribution ==
Canada, United States.
