= Nanoplagia sinaica =

Scientific classification
- Kingdom: Animalia
- Phylum: Arthropoda
- Class: Insecta
- Order: Diptera
- Family: Tachinidae
- Subfamily: Dexiinae
- Tribe: Voriini
- Genus: Nanoplagia
- Species: N. sinaica

Binomial name
- Nanoplagia sinaica (Villeneuve, 1909)

Synonyms
- Hypovoria aperticella Belanovsky, 1953; Plagia hilfii var. sinaica Villeneuve, 1909

Species of fly

Nanoplagia sinaica is a species of fly in the family Tachinidae.

== Distribution ==
Ukraine, Spain, Kazakhstan, Israel, Palestine, Algeria, Egypt, Morocco, Russia, Transcaucasia.
