= Calcageria incidens =

Scientific classification
- Kingdom: Animalia
- Phylum: Arthropoda
- Class: Insecta
- Order: Diptera
- Family: Tachinidae
- Subfamily: Dexiinae
- Tribe: Voriini
- Genus: Calcageria
- Species: C. incidens

Binomial name
- Calcageria incidens Curran, 1927

Species of fly

Calcageria incidens is a species of fly in the family Tachinidae.

== Distribution ==
New Zealand.
