= Nardia rufolateralis =

Scientific classification
- Kingdom: Animalia
- Phylum: Arthropoda
- Class: Insecta
- Order: Diptera
- Family: Tachinidae
- Subfamily: Dexiinae
- Tribe: Voriini
- Genus: Nardia
- Species: N. rufolateralis

Binomial name
- Nardia rufolateralis (Crosskey, 1984)

Synonyms
- Plagiomima rufolateralis Crosskey, 1984

Species of fly

Nardia rufolateralis is a species of fly in the family Tachinidae.

== Distribution ==
Botswana, Namibia.
