= Plagiomyia turbida =

Scientific classification
- Kingdom: Animalia
- Phylum: Arthropoda
- Class: Insecta
- Order: Diptera
- Family: Tachinidae
- Subfamily: Dexiinae
- Tribe: Voriini
- Genus: Plagiomyia
- Species: P. turbida

Binomial name
- Plagiomyia turbida (Hutton, 1901)

Synonyms
- Calcager turbida Hutton, 1901

Species of fly

Plagiomyia turbida is a species of fly in the family Tachinidae.

== Distribution ==
New Zealand.
