= Blepharomyia tibialis =

Scientific classification
- Kingdom: Animalia
- Phylum: Arthropoda
- Class: Insecta
- Order: Diptera
- Family: Tachinidae
- Subfamily: Dexiinae
- Tribe: Voriini
- Genus: Blepharomyia
- Species: B. tibialis

Binomial name
- Blepharomyia tibialis (Curran, 1927)

Synonyms
- Celotrophus soporis Reinhard, 1958; Eulasiona tibialis Curran, 1927

Species of fly

Blepharomyia tibialis is a species of fly in the family Tachinidae.

== Distribution ==
Canada, United States.
