= Goniochaeta plagioides =

Scientific classification
- Kingdom: Animalia
- Phylum: Arthropoda
- Class: Insecta
- Order: Diptera
- Family: Tachinidae
- Subfamily: Dexiinae
- Tribe: Voriini
- Genus: Goniochaeta
- Species: G. plagioides

Binomial name
- Goniochaeta plagioides Townsend, 1891

Species of fly

Goniochaeta plagioides is a species of fly in the family Tachinidae.

== Distribution ==
United States.
