= Arrhinactia cylindrica =

Scientific classification
- Kingdom: Animalia
- Phylum: Arthropoda
- Class: Insecta
- Order: Diptera
- Family: Tachinidae
- Subfamily: Dexiinae
- Tribe: Voriini
- Genus: Arrhinactia
- Species: A. cylindrica

Binomial name
- Arrhinactia cylindrica Townsend, 1927

Species of fly

Arrhinactia cylindrica is a species of fly in the family Tachinidae.

== Distribution ==
Brazil.
