= Hyleorus furcatus =

Scientific classification
- Kingdom: Animalia
- Phylum: Arthropoda
- Clade: Pancrustacea
- Class: Insecta
- Order: Diptera
- Family: Tachinidae
- Subfamily: Dexiinae
- Tribe: Voriini
- Genus: Hyleorus
- Species: H. furcatus

Binomial name
- Hyleorus furcatus Aldrich, 1926

Species of fly

Hyleorus furcatus is a species of fly in the family Tachinidae.

== Distribution ==
Australia, Papua New Guinea.
