= Nanoplagia hilfii =

Scientific classification
- Kingdom: Animalia
- Phylum: Arthropoda
- Class: Insecta
- Order: Diptera
- Family: Tachinidae
- Subfamily: Dexiinae
- Tribe: Voriini
- Genus: Nanoplagia
- Species: N. hilfii

Binomial name
- Nanoplagia hilfii (Strobl, 1902)

Synonyms
- Plagia hilfii Strobl, 1902

Species of fly

Nanoplagia hilfii is a species of fly in the family Tachinidae.

== Distribution ==
Serbia, Turkey, Armenia.
