= Plagiomima incognita =

Scientific classification
- Kingdom: Animalia
- Phylum: Arthropoda
- Class: Insecta
- Order: Diptera
- Family: Tachinidae
- Subfamily: Dexiinae
- Tribe: Voriini
- Genus: Plagiomima
- Species: P. incognita

Binomial name
- Plagiomima incognita (Wulp, 1890)

Synonyms
- Plagia incognita Wulp, 1890

Species of fly

Plagiomima incognita is a species of fly in the family Tachinidae.

== Distribution ==
Mexico.
