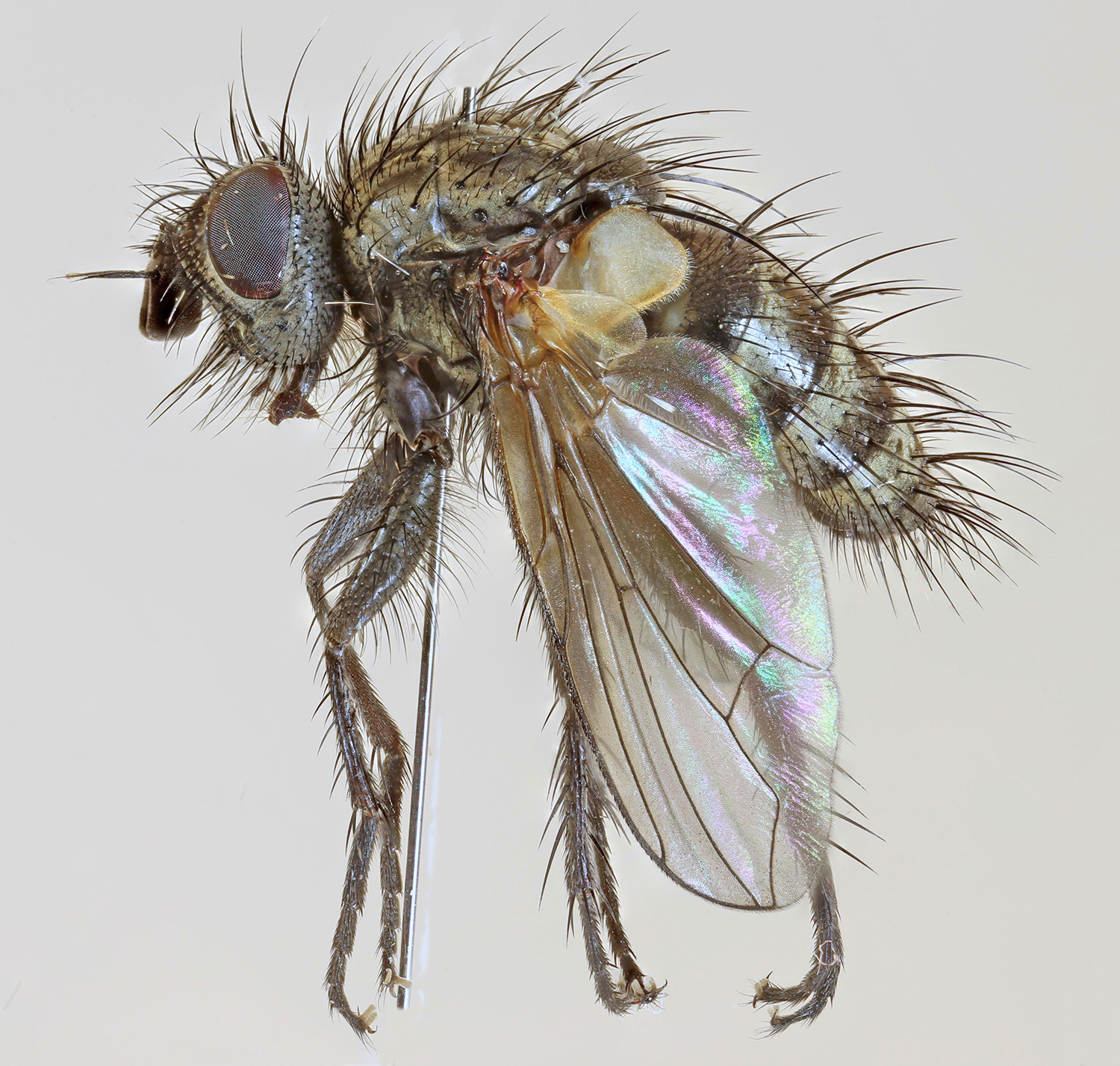
- Blepharomyia piliceps

Scientific classification
- Kingdom: Animalia
- Phylum: Arthropoda
- Class: Insecta
- Order: Diptera
- Family: Tachinidae
- Subfamily: Dexiinae
- Tribe: Voriini
- Genus: Blepharomyia
- Species: B. piliceps

Binomial name
- Blepharomyia piliceps (Zetterstedt, 1859)

Synonyms
- Tachina piliceps Zetterstedt, 1859; Blepharomyia collini Wainwright, 1928

= Blepharomyia piliceps =

Species of fly

Blepharomyia piliceps is a species of fly in the family Tachinidae.

== Distribution ==
Austria, Bulgaria, Czech Republic, Denmark, Finland, Germany, Netherlands, Norway, Poland, Slovakia, Spain, Sweden, Switzerland and United Kingdom
