= Spathidexia dunningii =

Scientific classification
- Kingdom: Animalia
- Phylum: Arthropoda
- Clade: Pancrustacea
- Class: Insecta
- Order: Diptera
- Family: Tachinidae
- Subfamily: Dexiinae
- Tribe: Voriini
- Genus: Spathidexia
- Species: S. dunningii

Binomial name
- Spathidexia dunningii (Coquillett, 1895)

Synonyms
- Spathidexia rasilis Reinhard, 1934; Thryptocera dunningii Coquillett, 1895

Species of fly

Spathidexia dunningii is a species of fly in the family Tachinidae.

== Distribution ==
Canada, United States, Costa Rica, Jamaica.
