= Eulasiona luteipennis =

Scientific classification
- Kingdom: Animalia
- Phylum: Arthropoda
- Class: Insecta
- Order: Diptera
- Family: Tachinidae
- Subfamily: Dexiinae
- Tribe: Voriini
- Genus: Eulasiona
- Species: E. luteipennis

Binomial name
- Eulasiona luteipennis Mesnil, 1963

Species of fly

Eulasiona luteipennis is a species of fly in the family Tachinidae.

== Distribution ==
Russia.
