= Hyleorus nudinerva =

Scientific classification
- Kingdom: Animalia
- Phylum: Arthropoda
- Class: Insecta
- Order: Diptera
- Family: Tachinidae
- Subfamily: Dexiinae
- Tribe: Voriini
- Genus: Hyleorus
- Species: H. nudinerva

Binomial name
- Hyleorus nudinerva (Villeneuve, 1920)

Synonyms
- Plagia elata ssp. nudinerva Villeneuve, 1920

Species of fly

Hyleorus nudinerva is a species of fly in the family Tachinidae.

== Distribution ==
Spain, Yemen, Israel.
