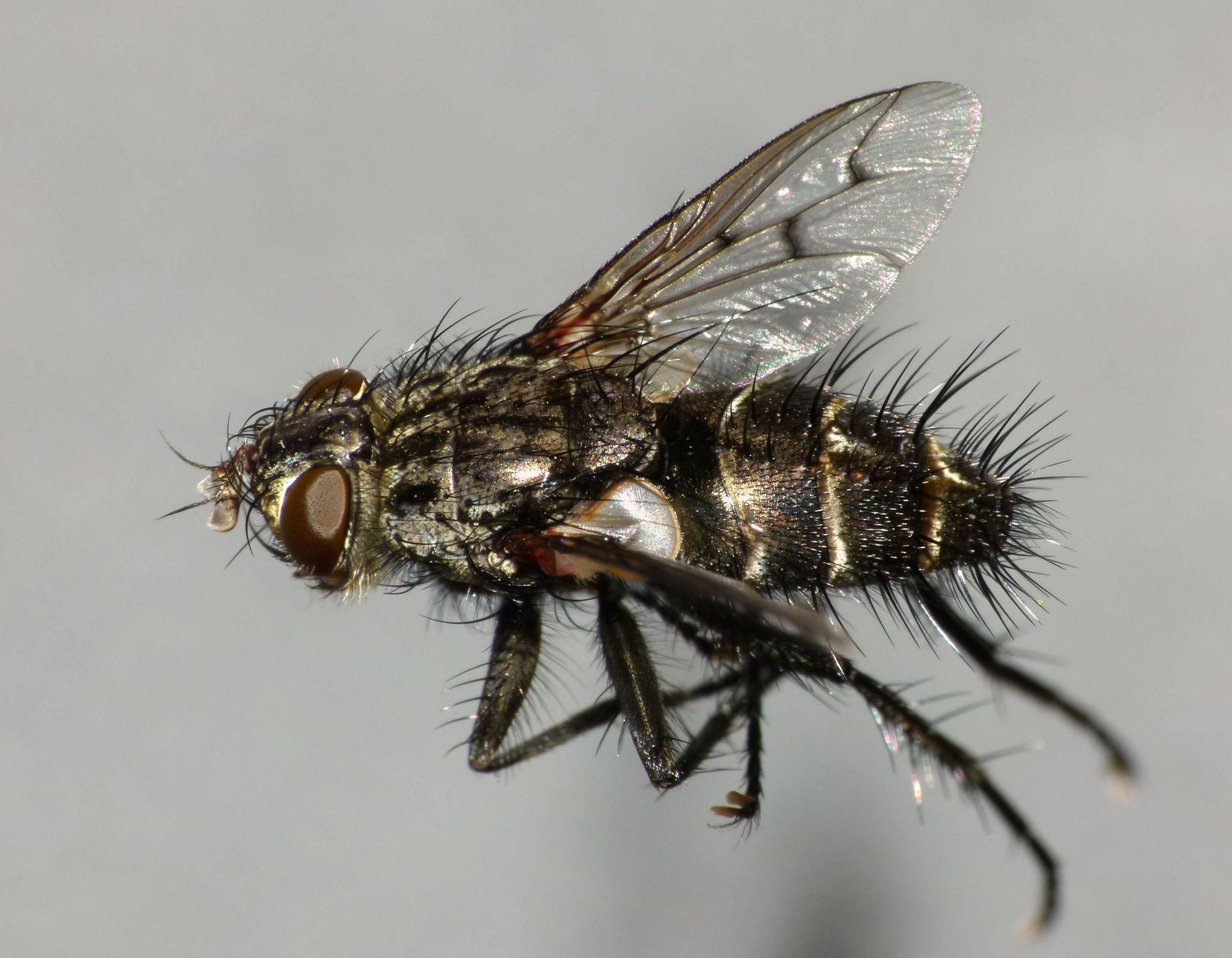

Scientific classification
- Kingdom: Animalia
- Phylum: Arthropoda
- Clade: Pancrustacea
- Class: Insecta
- Order: Diptera
- Family: Tachinidae
- Subfamily: Dexiinae
- Tribe: Voriini
- Genus: Calcager
- Species: C. apertum

Binomial name
- Calcager apertum Hutton, 1901

= Calcager apertum =

Species of fly

Calcager apertum is a species of fly in the family Tachinidae. The species was originally described by Frederick Hutton 1901. A subsequent description was given by John Russell Malloch 1938. John S. Dugdale 1969 provided descriptions of the 1st instar larvae and the male and female genitalia of Calcager.

== Distribution ==
New Zealand.
