= Blepharomyia spinosa =

Scientific classification
- Kingdom: Animalia
- Phylum: Arthropoda
- Class: Insecta
- Order: Diptera
- Family: Tachinidae
- Subfamily: Dexiinae
- Tribe: Voriini
- Genus: Blepharomyia
- Species: B. spinosa

Binomial name
- Blepharomyia spinosa (Coquillett, 1897)

Synonyms
- Eulasiona spinosa Coquillett, 1897

Species of fly

Blepharomyia spinosa is a species of fly in the family Tachinidae.

== Distribution ==
Canada, United States.
