= Meledonus californicus =

Scientific classification
- Kingdom: Animalia
- Phylum: Arthropoda
- Class: Insecta
- Order: Diptera
- Family: Tachinidae
- Subfamily: Dexiinae
- Tribe: Voriini
- Genus: Meledonus
- Species: M. californicus

Binomial name
- Meledonus californicus (Coquillett, 1895)

Synonyms
- Amobia californicus Coquillett, 1895; Athanatus knowltoni Reinhard, 1947

Species of fly

Meledonus californicus is a species of fly in the family Tachinidae.

== Distribution ==
Canada, United States.
