= H. aurea =

H. aurea may refer to:

- Halydaia aurea, a tachinid fly species
- Hypseleotris aurea, the golden gudgeon, a fish species endemic to Australia

== Synonyms ==
- Heliconia aurea, a synonym for Heliconia bihai, the red palulu, an erect herb species native to South America, specially Brazil and Guianas

== See also ==
- Aurea (disambiguation)
