= Rhamphina rectirostris =

Scientific classification
- Kingdom: Animalia
- Phylum: Arthropoda
- Class: Insecta
- Order: Diptera
- Family: Tachinidae
- Subfamily: Dexiinae
- Tribe: Voriini
- Genus: Rhamphina
- Species: R. rectirostris

Binomial name
- Rhamphina rectirostris Herting, 1971

Synonyms
- Czernya longirstris (Strobl, 1910)

Species of fly

Rhamphina rectirostris is a species of fly in the family Tachinidae.

== Distribution ==
Spain.
