= Leptothelaira longicaudata =

Scientific classification
- Kingdom: Animalia
- Phylum: Arthropoda
- Class: Insecta
- Order: Diptera
- Family: Tachinidae
- Subfamily: Dexiinae
- Tribe: Voriini
- Genus: Leptothelaira
- Species: L. longicaudata

Binomial name
- Leptothelaira longicaudata Mesnil & Shima, 1979

Species of fly

Leptothelaira longicaudata is a species of fly in the family Tachinidae.

== Distribution ==
Japan, Russia.
