= Wagneria gagatea =

Scientific classification
- Kingdom: Animalia
- Phylum: Arthropoda
- Class: Insecta
- Order: Diptera
- Family: Tachinidae
- Subfamily: Dexiinae
- Tribe: Voriini
- Genus: Wagneria
- Species: W. gagatea

Binomial name
- Wagneria gagatea Robineau-Desvoidy, 1830

Synonyms
- Atrania hyalinata Robineau-Desvoidy, 1863; Scopolia succincta Meigen, 1838; Wagneria fasciata Robineau-Desvoidy, 1863

Species of fly

Wagneria gagatea is a species of fly in the family Tachinidae.

== Distribution ==
British Isles, Czech Republic, Hungary, Romania, Slovakia, Andorra, Bulgaria, Greece, Italy, Serbia, Spain, Austria, Belgium, France, Germany, Netherlands, Switzerland, North Korea, Russia.
