= Actinochaetopteryx antennalis =

Scientific classification
- Kingdom: Animalia
- Phylum: Arthropoda
- Class: Insecta
- Order: Diptera
- Family: Tachinidae
- Subfamily: Dexiinae
- Tribe: Voriini
- Genus: Actinochaetopteryx
- Species: A. antennalis

Binomial name
- Actinochaetopteryx antennalis Dear & Crosskey, 1982

Species of fly

Actinochaetopteryx antennalis is a species of fly in the family Tachinidae.

== Distribution ==
Philippines.
