= Metaplagia orientalis =

Scientific classification
- Kingdom: Animalia
- Phylum: Arthropoda
- Class: Insecta
- Order: Diptera
- Family: Tachinidae
- Subfamily: Dexiinae
- Tribe: Voriini
- Genus: Metaplagia
- Species: M. orientalis

Binomial name
- Metaplagia orientalis (Townsend, 1915)

Synonyms
- Metavoria orientalis Townsend, 1915

Species of fly

Metaplagia orientalis is a species of fly in the family Tachinidae.

== Distribution ==
United States.
