= Spathidexia flavicornis =

Scientific classification
- Kingdom: Animalia
- Phylum: Arthropoda
- Class: Insecta
- Order: Diptera
- Family: Tachinidae
- Subfamily: Dexiinae
- Tribe: Voriini
- Genus: Spathidexia
- Species: S. flavicornis

Binomial name
- Spathidexia flavicornis (Brauer & von Berganstamm, 1891)

Synonyms
- Minthodexia flavicornis Brauer & von Berganstamm, 1891

Species of fly

Spathidexia flavicornis is a species of fly in the family Tachinidae.

== Distribution ==
Venezuela.
