= Stomina tachinoides =

Scientific classification
- Kingdom: Animalia
- Phylum: Arthropoda
- Class: Insecta
- Order: Diptera
- Family: Tachinidae
- Subfamily: Dexiinae
- Tribe: Voriini
- Genus: Stomina
- Species: S. tachinoides

Binomial name
- Stomina tachinoides (Fallén, 1817)

Synonyms
- Arisbaea lateralis Robineau-Desvoidy, 1863; Dexia pellucens Egger, 1861; Musca tachinoides Fallén, 1817; Tachina circumflexa Zetterstedt, 1844; Stomina rubricornis Robineau-Desvoidy, 1830

Species of fly

Stomina tachinoides is a species of fly in the family Tachinidae.

== Distribution ==
Czech Republic, Estonia, Hungary, Moldova, Poland, Romania, Slovakia, Ukraine, Finland, Sweden, Andorra, Bulgaria, Corse, Croatia, Italy, Portugal, Serbia, Slovenia, Spain, Turkey, Austria, France, Germany, Switzerland, Israel, Palestine, Mongolia, Russia.
