= Hypovoria cauta =

Scientific classification
- Kingdom: Animalia
- Phylum: Arthropoda
- Class: Insecta
- Order: Diptera
- Family: Tachinidae
- Subfamily: Dexiinae
- Tribe: Voriini
- Genus: Hypovoria
- Species: H. cauta

Binomial name
- Hypovoria cauta (Townsend, 1926)

Synonyms
- Catalinovoria cauta Townsend, 1926; Sthenopleura latifrons Aldrich, 1926

Species of fly

Hypovoria cauta is a species of fly in the family Tachinidae.

== Distribution ==
Canada, United States, Mexico.
