= Plagiomima spinosula =

Scientific classification
- Kingdom: Animalia
- Phylum: Arthropoda
- Class: Insecta
- Order: Diptera
- Family: Tachinidae
- Subfamily: Dexiinae
- Tribe: Voriini
- Genus: Plagiomima
- Species: P. spinosula

Binomial name
- Plagiomima spinosula (Bigot, 1889)

Species of fly

Plagiomima spinosula is a species of fly in the family Tachinidae.

== Distribution ==
Canada, United States.
