= Dexiomimops longipes =

Scientific classification
- Kingdom: Animalia
- Phylum: Arthropoda
- Class: Insecta
- Order: Diptera
- Family: Tachinidae
- Subfamily: Dexiinae
- Tribe: Voriini
- Genus: Dexiomimops
- Species: D. longipes

Binomial name
- Dexiomimops longipes Townsend, 1926

Species of fly

Dexiomimops longipes is a species of fly in the family Tachinidae.

== Distribution ==
Sumatra.
