= Chaetovoria antennata =

Scientific classification
- Kingdom: Animalia
- Phylum: Arthropoda
- Class: Insecta
- Order: Diptera
- Family: Tachinidae
- Subfamily: Dexiinae
- Tribe: Voriini
- Genus: Chaetovoria
- Species: C. antennata

Binomial name
- Chaetovoria antennata (Villeneuve, 1920)

Synonyms
- Voria (Chaetovoria) antennata Villeneuve, 1920

Species of fly

Chaetovoria antennata is a species of fly in the family Tachinidae.

== Distribution ==
Finland, Norway, Sweden, Italy, France, Switzerland, Russia, China.
