= Feriola insularis =

Scientific classification
- Kingdom: Animalia
- Phylum: Arthropoda
- Class: Insecta
- Order: Diptera
- Family: Tachinidae
- Subfamily: Dexiinae
- Tribe: Voriini
- Genus: Feriola
- Species: F. insularis

Binomial name
- Feriola insularis Richter, 1986

Species of fly

Feriola insularis is a species of fly in the family Tachinidae.

== Distribution ==
China, Russia.
