= Peteina erinaceus =

Scientific classification
- Kingdom: Animalia
- Phylum: Arthropoda
- Class: Insecta
- Order: Diptera
- Family: Tachinidae
- Subfamily: Dexiinae
- Tribe: Voriini
- Genus: Peteina
- Species: P. erinaceus

Binomial name
- Peteina erinaceus Fabricius, 1794

Synonyms
- Musca erinaceus Fabricius, 1794

Species of fly

Peteina erinaceus is a species of fly in the family Tachinidae.

== Distribution ==
Czech Republic, Estonia, Poland, Romania, Slovakia, Ukraine, Denmark, Finland, Norway, Sweden, Bulgaria, Italy, Austria, Belgium, France, Germany, Netherlands, Switzerland, Mongolia, Russia, Armenia, China.
