= Myioclura necopina =

Scientific classification
- Kingdom: Animalia
- Phylum: Arthropoda
- Class: Insecta
- Order: Diptera
- Family: Tachinidae
- Subfamily: Dexiinae
- Tribe: Voriini
- Genus: Myioclura
- Species: M. necopina

Binomial name
- Myioclura necopina Reinhard, 1975

Species of fly

Myioclura necopina is a species of fly in the family Tachinidae.

== Distribution ==
Paraguay.
