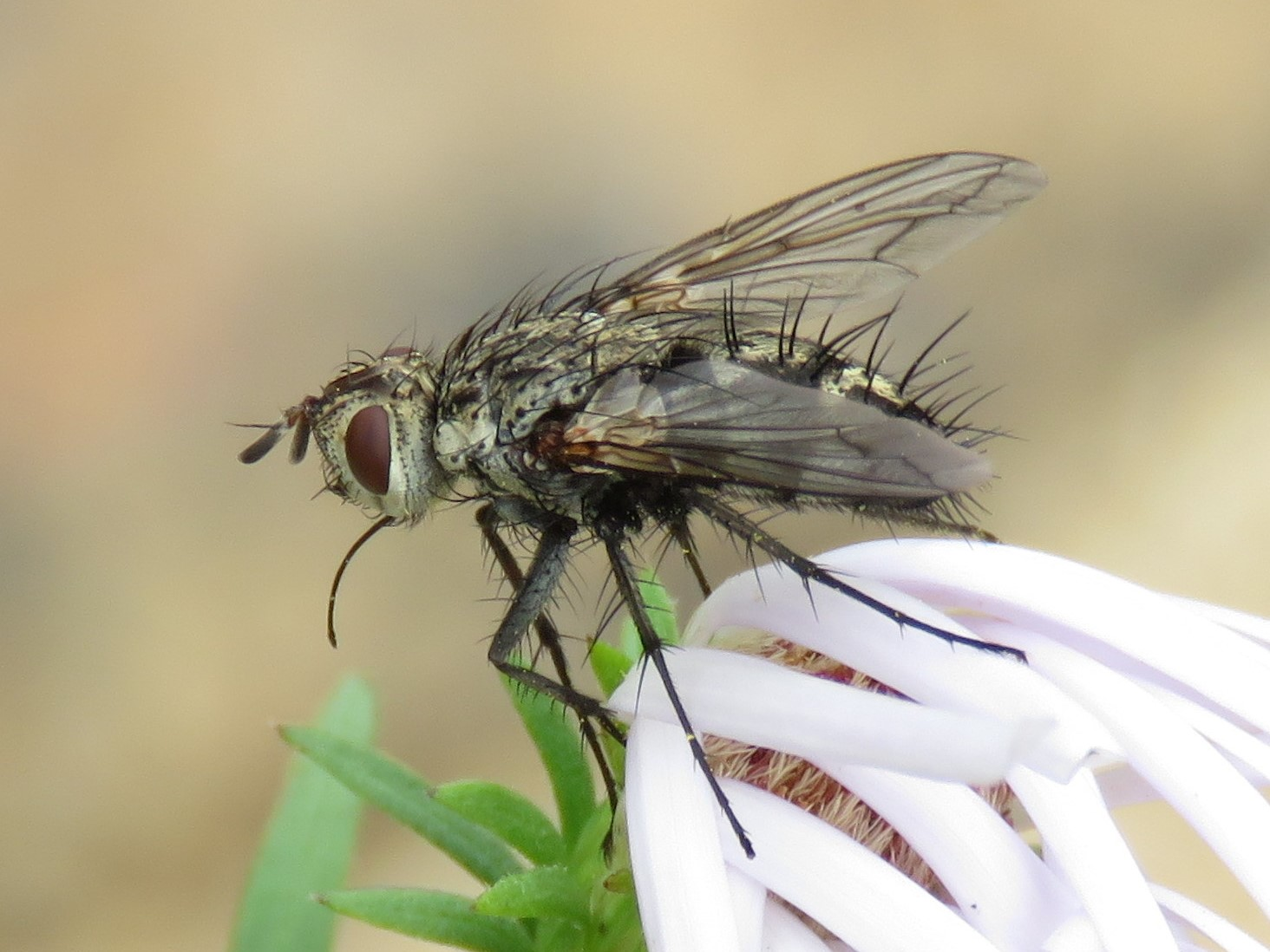

Scientific classification
- Kingdom: Animalia
- Phylum: Arthropoda
- Class: Insecta
- Order: Diptera
- Family: Tachinidae
- Subfamily: Dexiinae
- Tribe: Voriini
- Genus: Trochilodes
- Species: T. skinneri

Binomial name
- Trochilodes skinneri Coquillett, 1903

= Trochilodes skinneri =

Species of fly

Trochilodes skinneri is a species of fly in the family Tachinidae. It is found in Canada and the United States.
