= Polygaster egregia =

Scientific classification
- Kingdom: Animalia
- Phylum: Arthropoda
- Class: Insecta
- Order: Diptera
- Family: Tachinidae
- Subfamily: Dexiinae
- Tribe: Voriini
- Genus: Polygaster
- Species: P. egregia

Binomial name
- Polygaster egregia Wulp, 1890

Species of fly

Polygaster egregia is a species of fly in the family Tachinidae.

== Distribution ==
Mexico.
