= Prosopochaeta caliginosa =

Scientific classification
- Kingdom: Animalia
- Phylum: Arthropoda
- Class: Insecta
- Order: Diptera
- Family: Tachinidae
- Subfamily: Dexiinae
- Tribe: Voriini
- Genus: Prosopochaeta
- Species: P. caliginosa

Binomial name
- Prosopochaeta caliginosa Cortés & Campos, 1971

Species of fly

Prosopochaeta caliginosa is a species of fly in the family Tachinidae.

== Distribution ==
Argentina, Chile.
