= Meledonus latipennis =

Scientific classification
- Kingdom: Animalia
- Phylum: Arthropoda
- Class: Insecta
- Order: Diptera
- Family: Tachinidae
- Subfamily: Dexiinae
- Tribe: Voriini
- Genus: Meledonus
- Species: M. latipennis

Binomial name
- Meledonus latipennis Aldrich, 1926

Species of fly

Meledonus latipennis is a species of fly in the family Tachinidae.

== Distribution ==
California.
