= Neosolieria nasuta =

Scientific classification
- Kingdom: Animalia
- Phylum: Arthropoda
- Class: Insecta
- Order: Diptera
- Family: Tachinidae
- Subfamily: Dexiinae
- Tribe: Voriini
- Genus: Neosolieria
- Species: N. nasuta

Binomial name
- Neosolieria nasuta Townsend, 1927

Species of fly

Neosolieria nasuta is a species of fly in the family Tachinidae.

== Distribution ==
Peru.
