= Actinochaetopteryx setifacies =

Scientific classification
- Kingdom: Animalia
- Phylum: Arthropoda
- Clade: Pancrustacea
- Class: Insecta
- Order: Diptera
- Family: Tachinidae
- Subfamily: Dexiinae
- Tribe: Voriini
- Genus: Actinochaetopteryx
- Species: A. setifacies

Binomial name
- Actinochaetopteryx setifacies Shima, 1988

Species of fly

Actinochaetopteryx setifacies is a species of fly that belongs to the genus Actinochaetopteryx, and the family Tachinidae. It was first described by Hiroshi Shima in 1988.

This species is native to:

- Indonesia

== Distribution ==
Sulawesi.
