= Minthoplagia rafaeli =

Scientific classification
- Kingdom: Animalia
- Phylum: Arthropoda
- Class: Insecta
- Order: Diptera
- Family: Tachinidae
- Subfamily: Dexiinae
- Tribe: Voriini
- Genus: Minthoplagia
- Species: M. rafaeli

Binomial name
- Minthoplagia rafaeli Townsend, 1915

Species of fly

Minthoplagia rafaeli is a species of fly in the family Tachinidae.

== Distribution ==
Mexico.
