= Rhamphina =

Rhamphina may refer to:

- Rhamphina (fly), a genus of insects in the family Tachinidae
- Rhamphina (weevil), a subtribe of beetles in the tribe Rhamphini of the family Curculionidae
