= Homohypochaeta reclinata =

Scientific classification
- Kingdom: Animalia
- Phylum: Arthropoda
- Class: Insecta
- Order: Diptera
- Family: Tachinidae
- Subfamily: Dexiinae
- Tribe: Voriini
- Genus: Homohypochaeta
- Species: H. reclinata

Binomial name
- Homohypochaeta reclinata Townsend, 1927

Species of fly

Homohypochaeta reclinata is a species of fly in the family Tachinidae.

== Distribution ==
Peru.
