= Spathidexia setipennis =

Scientific classification
- Kingdom: Animalia
- Phylum: Arthropoda
- Class: Insecta
- Order: Diptera
- Family: Tachinidae
- Subfamily: Dexiinae
- Tribe: Voriini
- Genus: Spathidexia
- Species: S. setipennis

Binomial name
- Spathidexia setipennis (Townsend, 1919)

Synonyms
- Gymnopalpus setipennis Townsend, 1919

Species of fly

Spathidexia setipennis is a species of fly in the family Tachinidae.

== Distribution ==
Trinidad and Tobago, Guatemala.
