= Eulasiona vagabunda =

Scientific classification
- Kingdom: Animalia
- Phylum: Arthropoda
- Class: Insecta
- Order: Diptera
- Family: Tachinidae
- Subfamily: Dexiinae
- Tribe: Voriini
- Genus: Eulasiona
- Species: E. vagabunda

Binomial name
- Eulasiona vagabunda (Wulp, 1890)

Synonyms
- Didyma vagabunda Wulp, 1890

Species of fly

Eulasiona vagabunda is a species of fly in the family Tachinidae.

== Distribution ==
Mexico.
