= Eulasiona comstocki =

Scientific classification
- Kingdom: Animalia
- Phylum: Arthropoda
- Class: Insecta
- Order: Diptera
- Family: Tachinidae
- Subfamily: Dexiinae
- Tribe: Voriini
- Genus: Eulasiona
- Species: E. comstocki

Binomial name
- Eulasiona comstocki Townsend, 1892

Species of fly

Eulasiona comstocki is a species of fly in the family Tachinidae.

== Distribution ==
Canada, United States, Mexico.
