= Heliaea =

Heliaea is:

- Heliaea (fly), a genus of flies in the family Tachinidae
- A different spelling for Heliaia, a court in Athenian democracy
