= Stomina calvescens =

Scientific classification
- Kingdom: Animalia
- Phylum: Arthropoda
- Class: Insecta
- Order: Diptera
- Family: Tachinidae
- Subfamily: Dexiinae
- Tribe: Voriini
- Genus: Stomina
- Species: S. calvescens

Binomial name
- Stomina calvescens Herting, 1977

Species of fly

Stomina calvescens is a species of fly in the family Tachinidae.

== Distribution ==
Croatia, Italy, Portugal, Spain, France, Switzerland.
