= Popperaneus =

Scientific classification
- Kingdom: Animalia
- Phylum: Arthropoda
- Subphylum: Chelicerata
- Class: Arachnida
- Order: Araneae
- Infraorder: Araneomorphae
- Family: Araneidae
- Genus: Popperaneus; Cabra-García & Hormiga, 2020

Type species
- Wixia gavensis (Camargo, 1950)

Species
- Popperaneus gavensis (Camargo, 1950); Popperaneus iguape (Levi, 1991)

Genus of spiders

Popperaneus is a small genus of South American orb-weaver spiders first described by J. Cabra-García and Gustavo Hormiga in 2020. As of November 2021 it contains only two species, both transferred from Wagneria: P. gavensis and P. iguape.
