= Prosopochaeta fidelis =

Scientific classification
- Kingdom: Animalia
- Phylum: Arthropoda
- Class: Insecta
- Order: Diptera
- Family: Tachinidae
- Subfamily: Dexiinae
- Tribe: Voriini
- Genus: Prosopochaeta
- Species: P. fidelis

Binomial name
- Prosopochaeta fidelis (Reinhard, 1967)

Synonyms
- Punaclista fidelis Reinhard, 1967

Species of fly

Prosopochaeta fidelis is a species of fly in the family Tachinidae.

== Distribution ==
Peru.
