= Prosopochaeta nitidiventris =

Scientific classification
- Kingdom: Animalia
- Phylum: Arthropoda
- Class: Insecta
- Order: Diptera
- Family: Tachinidae
- Subfamily: Dexiinae
- Tribe: Voriini
- Genus: Prosopochaeta
- Species: P. nitidiventris

Binomial name
- Prosopochaeta nitidiventris Macquart, 1851

Synonyms
- Prosopochoeta nitidiventris Macquart, 1851

Species of fly

Prosopochaeta nitidiventris is a species of fly in the family Tachinidae.

== Distribution ==
Argentina, Chile.
