= Metaplagia occidentalis =

Scientific classification
- Kingdom: Animalia
- Phylum: Arthropoda
- Class: Insecta
- Order: Diptera
- Family: Tachinidae
- Subfamily: Dexiinae
- Tribe: Voriini
- Genus: Metaplagia
- Species: M. occidentalis

Binomial name
- Metaplagia occidentalis Coquillett, 1895

Species of fly

Metaplagia occidentalis is a species of fly in the family Tachinidae.

== Distribution ==
United States.
