= Metopomuscopteryx tibialis =

Scientific classification
- Kingdom: Animalia
- Phylum: Arthropoda
- Clade: Pancrustacea
- Class: Insecta
- Order: Diptera
- Family: Tachinidae
- Subfamily: Dexiinae
- Tribe: Voriini
- Genus: Metopomuscopteryx
- Species: M. tibialis

Binomial name
- Metopomuscopteryx tibialis (Coquillett, 1902)

Synonyms
- Muscopteryx tibialis Coquillett, 1902

Species of fly

Metopomuscopteryx tibialis is a species of fly in the family Tachinidae.

== Distribution ==
Canada, United States.
