= Actinochaetopteryx nubifera =

Scientific classification
- Kingdom: Animalia
- Phylum: Arthropoda
- Class: Insecta
- Order: Diptera
- Family: Tachinidae
- Subfamily: Dexiinae
- Tribe: Voriini
- Genus: Actinochaetopteryx
- Species: A. nubifera

Binomial name
- Actinochaetopteryx nubifera Malloch, 1935

Species of fly

Actinochaetopteryx nubifera is a species of fly in the family Tachinidae.

== Distribution ==
Malaysia.
