= Allothelaira diaphana =

Scientific classification
- Kingdom: Animalia
- Phylum: Arthropoda
- Class: Insecta
- Order: Diptera
- Family: Tachinidae
- Subfamily: Dexiinae
- Tribe: Voriini
- Genus: Allothelaira
- Species: A. diaphana

Binomial name
- Allothelaira diaphana Villeneuve, 1915

Species of fly

Allothelaira diaphana is a species of fly in the family Tachinidae.

== Distribution ==
Cameroon, Democratic Republic of the Congo, Ghana, Nigeria, Sierra Leone, Tanzania.
