= Stomina caliendrata =

Scientific classification
- Kingdom: Animalia
- Phylum: Arthropoda
- Class: Insecta
- Order: Diptera
- Family: Tachinidae
- Subfamily: Dexiinae
- Tribe: Voriini
- Genus: Stomina
- Species: S. caliendrata

Binomial name
- Stomina caliendrata (Rondani, 1862)

Synonyms
- Morphomyia caliendrata Rondani, 1862

Species of fly

Stomina caliendrata is a species of fly in the family Tachinidae.

== Distribution ==
Hungary, Poland, Romania, Slovakia, Ukraine, Bulgaria, Croatia, Italy, Malta, Portugal, Spain, France, Iran, Israel, Algeria, Transcaucasia.
