= Parodomyiops =

Scientific classification
- Kingdom: Animalia
- Phylum: Arthropoda
- Class: Insecta
- Order: Diptera
- Family: Tachinidae
- Subfamily: Dexiinae
- Tribe: Voriini
- Genus: Parodomyiops; Townsend, 1935

Type species
- Parodomyiops thelairodops Townsend, 1935

Genus of flies

Parodomyiops is a genus of flies in the family Tachinidae.

== Species ==
- Parodomyiops thelairodops Townsend, 1935

== Distribution ==
Trinidad and Tobago, Guyana.
