= Thelairodes =

Scientific classification
- Kingdom: Animalia
- Phylum: Arthropoda
- Class: Insecta
- Order: Diptera
- Family: Tachinidae
- Subfamily: Dexiinae
- Tribe: Voriini
- Genus: Thelairodes; Wulp, 1891

Type species
- Homodexia vittigera Bigot, 1889

Synonyms
- Parodomyia Townsend, 1917

Genus of flies

Thelairodes is a genus of parasitic flies in the family Tachinidae.

== Species ==
- Thelairodes lavinia Curran, 1934
- Thelairodes pallidus Wulp, 1891
- Thelairodes paradoxicus (Townsend, 1917)
- Thelairodes spinosus (Bigot, 1889)
- Thelairodes vittigerus (Bigot, 1889)
