= Stenodexia =

Scientific classification
- Kingdom: Animalia
- Phylum: Arthropoda
- Class: Insecta
- Order: Diptera
- Family: Tachinidae
- Subfamily: Dexiinae
- Tribe: Voriini
- Genus: Stenodexia; Wulp, 1891

Type species
- Stenodexia albicincta Wulp, 1891

Genus of flies

Stenodexia is a genus of parasitic flies in the family Tachinidae.

== Species ==
- Stenodexia albicincta Wulp, 1891
- Stenodexia foxii Johnson, 1919
