= Chiloclista =

Scientific classification
- Kingdom: Animalia
- Phylum: Arthropoda
- Class: Insecta
- Order: Diptera
- Family: Tachinidae
- Subfamily: Dexiinae
- Tribe: Voriini
- Genus: Chiloclista; Townsend, 1931

Type species
- Chiloclista bicolor Townsend, 1931

Genus of flies

Chiloclista is a genus of flies in the family Tachinidae.

== Species ==
- Chiloclista bicolor Townsend, 1931

== Distribution ==
Chile.
