= Leptothelaira =

Scientific classification
- Kingdom: Animalia
- Phylum: Arthropoda
- Class: Insecta
- Order: Diptera
- Family: Tachinidae
- Subfamily: Dexiinae
- Tribe: Voriini
- Genus: Leptothelaira; Mesnil & Shima, 1979

Type species
- Leptothelaira longicaudata Mesnil & Shima, 1979

Genus of flies

Leptothelaira is a genus of flies in the family Tachinidae.

== Species ==
- Leptothelaira latistriata Shima, 1988
- Leptothelaira longicaudata Mesnil & Shima, 1979
- Leptothelaira longipennis Zhang, Wang & Liu, 2006
- Leptothelaira meridionalis Mesnil & Shima, 1979
- Leptothelaira orientalis Mesnil & Shima, 1979
