= Prosopochaeta =

Scientific classification
- Kingdom: Animalia
- Phylum: Arthropoda
- Class: Insecta
- Order: Diptera
- Family: Tachinidae
- Subfamily: Dexiinae
- Tribe: Voriini
- Genus: Prosopochaeta; Macquart, 1851

Type species
- Prosopochoeta nitidiventris Macquart, 1851

Synonyms
- Prosopochoeta Macquart, 1851; Punaclista Townsend, 1915

Genus of flies

Prosopochaeta is a genus of flies in the family Tachinidae.

== Species ==
- Prosopochaeta anomala Aldrich, 1934
- Prosopochaeta caliginosa Cortés & Campos, 1971
- Prosopochaeta fidelis (Reinhard, 1967)
- Prosopochaeta nitidiventris Macquart, 1851
- Prosopochaeta setosa (Townsend, 1915)
