= Nardia (fly) =

Scientific classification
- Kingdom: Animalia
- Phylum: Arthropoda
- Class: Insecta
- Order: Diptera
- Family: Tachinidae
- Subfamily: Dexiinae
- Tribe: Voriini
- Genus: Nardia; Cerretti, 2009

Type species
- Plagiomima rufolateralis Crosskey, 1984

Genus of flies

Nardia is a genus of flies in the family Tachinidae.

== Species ==
- Nardia rufolateralis (Crosskey, 1984)
- Nardia tsavo Cerretti, 2009
