= Dischotrichia =

Scientific classification
- Kingdom: Animalia
- Phylum: Arthropoda
- Class: Insecta
- Order: Diptera
- Family: Tachinidae
- Subfamily: Dexiinae
- Tribe: Voriini
- Genus: Dischotrichia; Cortés, 1944

Type species
- Dischotrichia caelibata Cortés, 1944

Genus of flies

Dischotrichia is a genus of flies in the family Tachinidae.

== Species ==
- Dischotrichia caelibata Cortés, 1944

== Distribution ==
Chile.
