= Haracca =

Scientific classification
- Kingdom: Animalia
- Phylum: Arthropoda
- Class: Insecta
- Order: Diptera
- Family: Tachinidae
- Subfamily: Dexiinae
- Tribe: Voriini
- Genus: Haracca; Richter, 1995

Type species
- Haracca parnassiina Richter, 1995

Genus of flies

Haracca is a genus of flies in the family Tachinidae.

== Species ==
- Haracca parnassiina Richter, 1995

== Distribution ==
Uzbekistan.
