= Plagiomima =

Scientific classification
- Kingdom: Animalia
- Phylum: Arthropoda
- Class: Insecta
- Order: Diptera
- Family: Tachinidae
- Subfamily: Dexiinae
- Tribe: Voriini
- Genus: Plagiomima; Brauer & von Berganstamm, 1891

Type species
- Plagiomima disparata Brauer & von Berganstamm, 1891

Synonyms
- Siphoplagia Townsend, 1891; Siphoplagiopsis Townsend, 1917

Genus of flies

Plagiomima is a genus of flies in the family Tachinidae.

== Species ==
- Plagiomima abdominalis Aldrich, 1926
- Plagiomima alternata Aldrich, 1926
- Plagiomima auriceps Aldrich, 1926
- Plagiomima brevirostris Reinhard, 1962
- Plagiomima cognata Aldrich, 1926
- Plagiomima disparata Brauer & von Berganstamm, 1891
- Plagiomima euethes Reinhard, 1957
- Plagiomima faceta Reinhard, 1957
- Plagiomima haustellata Reinhard, 1944
- Plagiomima incognita (Wulp, 1890)
- Plagiomima rigidirostris (Wulp, 1890)
- Plagiomima similis (Townsend, 1917)
- Plagiomima spinosula (Bigot, 1889)
