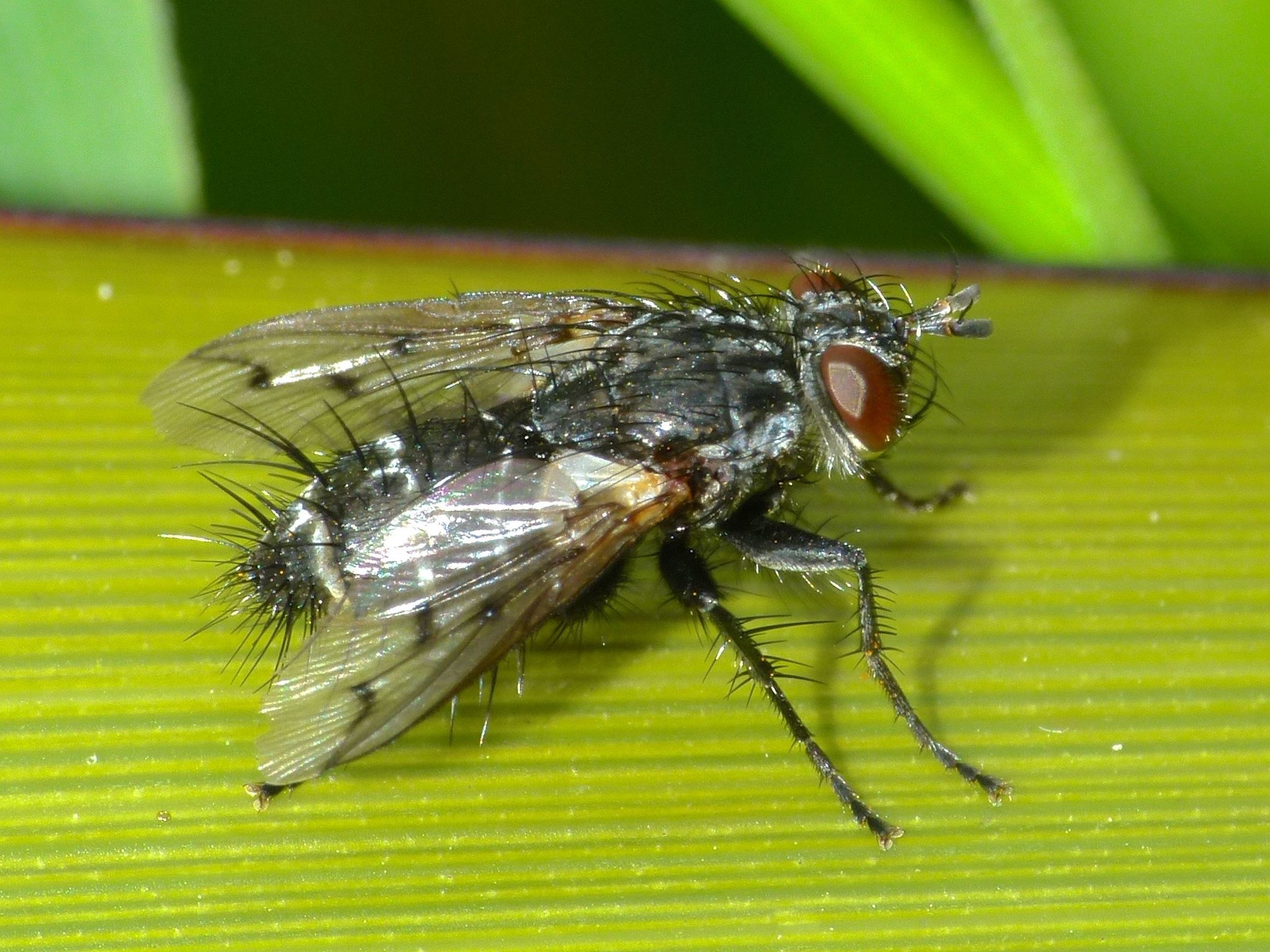
- Calcager apertum

Scientific classification
- Kingdom: Animalia
- Phylum: Arthropoda
- Class: Insecta
- Order: Diptera
- Family: Tachinidae
- Subfamily: Dexiinae
- Tribe: Voriini
- Genus: Calcager; Hutton, 1901

Type species
- Calcager apertum Hutton, 1901

= Calcager =

Genus of flies

Calcager is a genus of flies in the family Tachinidae.

== Species ==
- Calcager apertum Hutton, 1901
- Calcager dubius Malloch, 1938

== Distribution ==
New Zealand.
