= Metopomuscopteryx =

Scientific classification
- Kingdom: Animalia
- Phylum: Arthropoda
- Class: Insecta
- Order: Diptera
- Family: Tachinidae
- Subfamily: Dexiinae
- Tribe: Voriini
- Genus: Metopomuscopteryx; Townsend, 1915

Type species
- Muscopteryx tibialis Coquillett, 1902

Genus of flies

Metopomuscopteryx is a genus of flies in the family Tachinidae.

== Species ==
- Metopomuscopteryx fatigantis Reinhard, 1958
- Metopomuscopteryx incurata Reinhard, 1958
- Metopomuscopteryx tibialis (Coquillett, 1902)
