= Xanthopteromyia =

Scientific classification
- Kingdom: Animalia
- Phylum: Arthropoda
- Class: Insecta
- Order: Diptera
- Family: Tachinidae
- Subfamily: Dexiinae
- Tribe: Voriini
- Genus: Xanthopteromyia; Townsend, 1926

Type species
- Xanthopteromyia tegulata Townsend, 1926

Synonyms
- Xanthoteromyia Townsend, 1926; Proparathelaira Townsend, 1928

Genus of flies

Xanthopteromyia is a genus of flies in the family Tachinidae. This genus includes species such as Xanthopteromyia plumosa and Xanthopteromyia tegulata. These flies are diurnal and have a bilaterally symmetric body. They possess a tympanal organ as part of their auditory system and exhibit a diurnal behavioral circadian rhythm.

== Species ==
- Xanthopteromyia plumosa (Townsend, 1928)
- Xanthopteromyia tegulata Townsend, 1926
