= Bahrettinia =

Scientific classification
- Kingdom: Animalia
- Phylum: Arthropoda
- Class: Insecta
- Order: Diptera
- Family: Tachinidae
- Subfamily: Dexiinae
- Tribe: Voriini
- Genus: Bahrettinia; Özdikmen, 2007

Type species
- Psilopleura arida Reinhard, 1943

Synonyms
- Psilopleura Reinhard, 1943

Genus of flies

Bahrettinia is a genus of flies in the family Tachinidae.

== Species ==
- Bahrettinia arida (Reinhard, 1943)

== Distribution ==
United States.
