= Halydaia =

Scientific classification
- Kingdom: Animalia
- Phylum: Arthropoda
- Class: Insecta
- Order: Diptera
- Family: Tachinidae
- Subfamily: Dexiinae
- Tribe: Voriini
- Genus: Halydaia; Egger, 1856

Type species
- Halydaia aurea Egger, 1856

Synonyms
- Anaperistommyia Townsend, 1926; Halidaia Dalla Torre, 1897; Halidaya Frauenfeld, 1861; Halidaya Gerstaecker, 1857; Macropia Malloch, 1930

Genus of flies

Halydaia is a genus of flies in the family Tachinidae.

== Species ==
- Halydaia aurea Egger, 1856
- Halydaia luteicornis (Walker, 1861)
- Halydaia mackerrasi Paramonov, 1960
- Halydaia norrisi Paramonov, 1960
- Halydaia rufiventris (Malloch, 1930)
