= Dexiomimops =

Scientific classification
- Kingdom: Animalia
- Phylum: Arthropoda
- Class: Insecta
- Order: Diptera
- Family: Tachinidae
- Subfamily: Dexiinae
- Tribe: Voriini
- Genus: Dexiomimops; Townsend, 1926

Type species
- Dexiomimops longipes Townsend, 1926

Genus of flies

Dexiomimops is a genus of flies in the family Tachinidae.

== Species ==
- Dexiomimops brevipes Shima, 1987
- Dexiomimops crassipes Shima, 1987
- Dexiomimops curtipes Shima, 1987
- Dexiomimops flavipes Shima, 1987
- Dexiomimops fuscata Shima & Chao, 1992
- Dexiomimops longipes Townsend, 1926
- Dexiomimops pallipes Mesnil, 1957
- Dexiomimops rufipes Baranov, 1935
