= Cockerelliana =

Scientific classification
- Kingdom: Animalia
- Phylum: Arthropoda
- Class: Insecta
- Order: Diptera
- Family: Tachinidae
- Subfamily: Dexiinae
- Tribe: Voriini
- Genus: Cockerelliana; Townsend, 1915

Type species
- Cockerelliana capitata Townsend, 1915

Genus of flies

Cockerelliana is a genus of flies in the family Tachinidae.

== Species ==
- Cockerelliana capitata Townsend, 1915

== Distribution ==
United States.
