= Engeddia =

Scientific classification
- Kingdom: Animalia
- Phylum: Arthropoda
- Class: Insecta
- Order: Diptera
- Family: Tachinidae
- Subfamily: Dexiinae
- Tribe: Voriini
- Genus: Engeddia; Kugler, 1977

Type species
- Engeddia multisetosa Kugler, 1977

Genus of flies

Engeddia is a genus of flies in the family Tachinidae.

== Species ==
- Engeddia hispanica Tschorsnig, 1991
- Engeddia multisetosa Kugler, 1977
