= Polygaster =

Scientific classification
- Kingdom: Animalia
- Phylum: Arthropoda
- Class: Insecta
- Order: Diptera
- Family: Tachinidae
- Subfamily: Dexiinae
- Tribe: Voriini
- Genus: Polygaster; Wulp, 1890

Type species
- Polygaster ivu Wulp, 1890

Synonyms
- Polyhaster Zetina, Et Al. 2018; Polygastropsis Townsend, 1919; Actinomintho Townsend, 1928

Genus of flies

Polygaster is a genus of flies in the family Tachinidae.

== Species ==
- Polygaster brasiliensis Townsend, 1917
- Polygaster egregia Wulp, 1890
- Polygaster ivu (Townsend, 1928)
