= Eulasiona =

Scientific classification
- Kingdom: Animalia
- Phylum: Arthropoda
- Class: Insecta
- Order: Diptera
- Family: Tachinidae
- Subfamily: Dexiinae
- Tribe: Voriini
- Genus: Eulasiona; Townsend, 1892

Type species
- Eulasiona comstocki Townsend, 1892

Synonyms
- Paramuscopteryx Townsend, 1915; Paralispidea Townsend, 1915; Townsendina Curran, 1934; Lasionalia Curran, 1934; Canelomyia Reinhard, 1958

Genus of flies

Eulasiona is a genus of flies in the family Tachinidae.

== Species ==
- Eulasiona aperta (Reinhard, 1958)
- Eulasiona cinerea (Curran, 1934)
- Eulasiona comstocki Townsend, 1892
- Eulasiona fasciata (Curran, 1934)
- Eulasiona fumator (Reinhard, 1958)
- Eulasiona genalis (Townsend, 1915)
- Eulasiona luteipennis Mesnil, 1963
- Eulasiona nigra Curran, 1924
- Eulasiona unispinosa (Coquillett, 1898)
- Eulasiona urtamira Herting, 1973
- Eulasiona vagabunda (Wulp, 1890)
- Eulasiona zimini Mesnil, 1963
