= Neosolieria =

Scientific classification
- Kingdom: Animalia
- Phylum: Arthropoda
- Class: Insecta
- Order: Diptera
- Family: Tachinidae
- Subfamily: Dexiinae
- Tribe: Voriini
- Genus: Neosolieria; Townsend, 1927

Type species
- Neosolieria nasuta Townsend, 1927

Synonyms
- Parcipromus Reinhard, 1958

Genus of flies

Neosolieria is a genus of flies in the family Tachinidae.

== Species ==
- Neosolieria nasuta Townsend, 1927
- Neosolieria sila (Reinhard, 1958)
