= Trochilochaeta =

Scientific classification
- Kingdom: Animalia
- Phylum: Arthropoda
- Class: Insecta
- Order: Diptera
- Family: Tachinidae
- Subfamily: Dexiinae
- Tribe: Voriini
- Genus: Trochilochaeta; Townsend, 1940

Type species
- Trochilochaeta transcendens Townsend, 1940

Genus of flies

Trochilochaeta is a genus of flies in the family Tachinidae.

== Species ==
- Trochilochaeta transcendens Townsend, 1940

== Distribution ==
Brazil
