= Chaetodemoticus =

Scientific classification
- Kingdom: Animalia
- Phylum: Arthropoda
- Class: Insecta
- Order: Diptera
- Family: Tachinidae
- Subfamily: Dexiinae
- Tribe: Voriini
- Genus: Chaetodemoticus; Brauer & von Bergenstamm, 1891

Type species
- Demoticus chilensis Schiner, 1868

Genus of flies

Chaetodemoticus is a genus of bristle flies in the family Tachinidae.

== Species ==
- Chaetodemoticus chilensis (Schiner, 1868)

== Distribution ==
Chile.
