= Neotrafoiopsis =

Scientific classification
- Kingdom: Animalia
- Phylum: Arthropoda
- Class: Insecta
- Order: Diptera
- Family: Tachinidae
- Subfamily: Dexiinae
- Tribe: Voriini
- Genus: Neotrafoiopsis; Townsend, 1931

Type species
- Neotrafoiopsis andina Townsend, 1931

Genus of flies

Neotrafoiopsis is a genus of flies in the family Tachinidae.

== Species ==
- Neotrafoiopsis andina Townsend, 1931

== Distribution ==
Peru.
