= Xanthodexia =

Scientific classification
- Kingdom: Animalia
- Phylum: Arthropoda
- Class: Insecta
- Order: Diptera
- Family: Tachinidae
- Subfamily: Dexiinae
- Tribe: Voriini
- Genus: Xanthodexia; Wulp, 1891

Type species
- Dexia semipicta Walker, 1852

Synonyms
- Minthodexia Brauer & von Berganstamm, 1891

Genus of flies

Xanthodexia is a genus of flies in the family Tachinidae.

== Species ==
- Xanthodexia semipicta (Walker, 1853)
- Xanthodexia sericea (Wiedemann, 1830)
