= Doliolomyia =

Scientific classification
- Kingdom: Animalia
- Phylum: Arthropoda
- Class: Insecta
- Order: Diptera
- Family: Tachinidae
- Subfamily: Dexiinae
- Tribe: Voriini
- Genus: Doliolomyia; Reinhard, 1974

Type species
- Doliolomyia thessa Reinhard, 1975

Genus of flies

Doliolomyia is a genus of flies in the family Tachinidae.

== Species ==
- Doliolomyia alactaga Reinhard, 1975
- Doliolomyia thessa Reinhard, 1975

== Distribution ==
Mexico.
