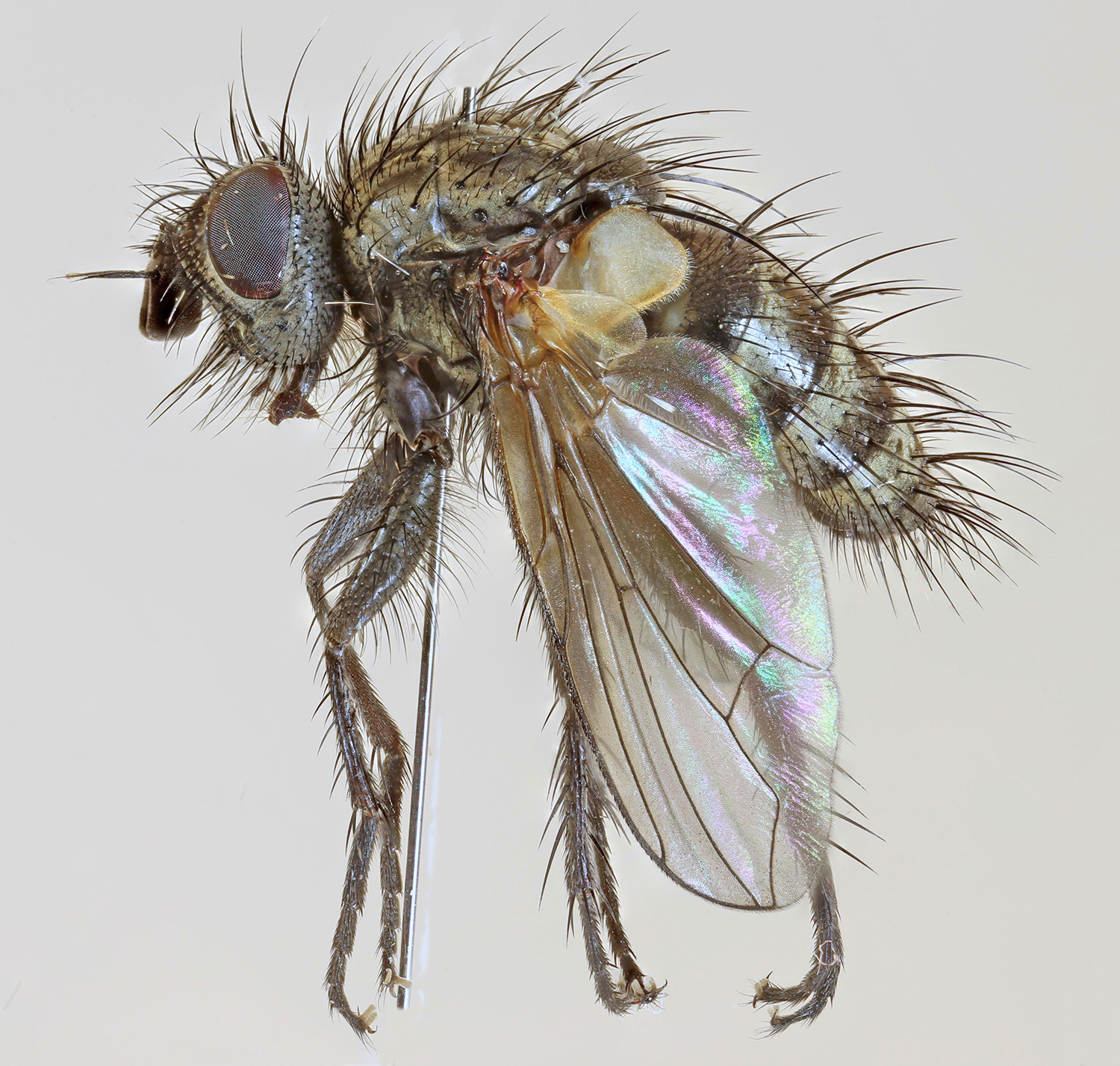
- Blepharomyia piliceps

Scientific classification
- Kingdom: Animalia
- Phylum: Arthropoda
- Clade: Pancrustacea
- Class: Insecta
- Order: Diptera
- Family: Tachinidae
- Subfamily: Dexiinae
- Tribe: Voriini
- Genus: Blepharomyia; Brauer & von Berganstamm, 1889

Type species
- Tachina amplicornis Zetterstedt, 1844

Synonyms
- Celotrophus Reinhard, 1958; Ictericophyto Townsend, 1916

= Blepharomyia =

Genus of flies

Blepharomyia is a genus of flies in the family Tachinidae.

== Species ==
- Blepharomyia angustifrons Herting, 1971
- Blepharomyia brevicornis Shima, Abe & Libra, 2021
- Blepharomyia foliacea Mesnil, 1975
- Blepharomyia pagana (Meigen, 1824)
- Blepharomyia piliceps (Zetterstedt, 1859)
- Blepharomyia spinosa (Coquillett, 1897)
- Blepharomyia tibialis (Curran, 1927)
