= Reichardia (fly) =

Scientific classification
- Kingdom: Animalia
- Phylum: Arthropoda
- Class: Insecta
- Order: Diptera
- Family: Tachinidae
- Subfamily: Dexiinae
- Tribe: Voriini
- Genus: Reichardia; Karsch, 1886

Type species
- Reichardia insignis Karsch, 1886

Genus of flies

Reichardia is a genus of flies in the family Tachinidae.

== Species ==
- Reichardia insignis Karsch, 1886

== Distribution ==
Tanzania.
