= Calcageria =

Scientific classification
- Kingdom: Animalia
- Phylum: Arthropoda
- Class: Insecta
- Order: Diptera
- Family: Tachinidae
- Subfamily: Dexiinae
- Tribe: Voriini
- Genus: Calcageria; Curran, 1927

Type species
- Calcageria incidens Curran, 1927

Genus of flies

Calcageria is a genus of flies in the family Tachinidae.

== Species ==
- Calcageria incidens Curran, 1927
- Calcageria varians Malloch, 1938

== Distribution ==
New Zealand.
