= Peteina =

Scientific classification
- Kingdom: Animalia
- Phylum: Arthropoda
- Class: Insecta
- Order: Diptera
- Family: Tachinidae
- Subfamily: Dexiinae
- Tribe: Voriini
- Genus: Peteina; Meigen, 1838

Type species
- Musca erinaceus Fabricius, 1794

Synonyms
- Petenia Herting & Dely-Draskovits, 1993; Petina Bezzi & Stein, 1907; Petina Ringdahl, 1933; Petena Verrall In Scudder, 1882

Genus of flies

Peteina is a genus of flies in the family Tachinidae.

== Species ==
- Peteina erinaceus (Fabricius, 1794)
- Peteina hyperdiscalis Aldrich, 1926
