= Stomina =

Scientific classification
- Kingdom: Animalia
- Phylum: Arthropoda
- Class: Insecta
- Order: Diptera
- Family: Tachinidae
- Subfamily: Dexiinae
- Tribe: Voriini
- Genus: Stomina; Robineau-Desvoidy, 1830

Type species
- Stomina rubricornis Robineau-Desvoidy, 1830

Synonyms
- Arisbaea Robineau-Desvoidy, 1863; Morphomya Rondani, 1856; Morphomyia Rondani, 1862

Genus of flies

Stomina is a genus of flies in the family Tachinidae.

== Species ==
- Stomina angustifrons Kugler, 1968
- Stomina caliendrata (Rondani, 1862)
- Stomina calvescens Herting, 1977
- Stomina iners (Meigen, 1835)
- Stomina kugleri Mesnil, 1975
- Stomina tachinoides (Fallén, 1817)
