= Hypochaetopsis =

Scientific classification
- Kingdom: Animalia
- Phylum: Arthropoda
- Class: Insecta
- Order: Diptera
- Family: Tachinidae
- Subfamily: Dexiinae
- Tribe: Voriini
- Genus: Hypochaetopsis; Townsend, 1915

Type species
- Hypochaetopsis chaetosa Townsend, 1915

Genus of flies

Hypochaetopsis is a genus of flies in the family Tachinidae.

== Species ==
- Hypochaetopsis chaetosa Townsend, 1915

== Distribution ==
Peru.
