= Nothovoria =

Scientific classification
- Kingdom: Animalia
- Phylum: Arthropoda
- Class: Insecta
- Order: Diptera
- Family: Tachinidae
- Subfamily: Dexiinae
- Tribe: Voriini
- Genus: Nothovoria; Cortés & González, 1990

Type species
- Nothovoria praestans Cortés & González, 1990

Genus of flies

Nothovoria is a genus of flies in the family Tachinidae.

== Species ==
- Nothovoria praestans Cortés & González, 1990

== Distribution ==
Chile.
