= Thelairodes vittigerus =

Scientific classification
- Kingdom: Animalia
- Phylum: Arthropoda
- Class: Insecta
- Order: Diptera
- Family: Tachinidae
- Genus: Thelairodes
- Species: T. vittigerus

Binomial name
- Thelairodes vittigerus (Bigot, 1889)

Synonyms
- Homodexia vittigera Bigot, 1889

Species of fly

Thelairodes vittigerus is a species of fly in the family Tachinidae.

Its native range is Mexico.
