= Myioclura =

Scientific classification
- Kingdom: Animalia
- Phylum: Arthropoda
- Class: Insecta
- Order: Diptera
- Family: Tachinidae
- Subfamily: Dexiinae
- Tribe: Voriini
- Genus: Myioclura; Reinhard, 1975

Type species
- Myioclura necopina Reinhard, 1975

Genus of flies

Myioclura is a genus of flies in the family Tachinidae.

== Species ==
- Myioclura melusina Reinhard, 1975
- Myioclura necopina Reinhard, 1975
