= Squamomedina =

Scientific classification
- Kingdom: Animalia
- Phylum: Arthropoda
- Class: Insecta
- Order: Diptera
- Family: Tachinidae
- Subfamily: Dexiinae
- Tribe: Voriini
- Genus: Squamomedina; Townsend, 1934

Type species
- Squamomedina squamata Townsend, 1934

Genus of flies

Squamomedina is a genus of flies in the family Tachinidae.

== Species ==
- Squamomedina squamata Townsend, 1934

== Distribution ==
Brazil.
