= Homohypochaeta =

Scientific classification
- Kingdom: Animalia
- Phylum: Arthropoda
- Clade: Pancrustacea
- Class: Insecta
- Order: Diptera
- Family: Tachinidae
- Subfamily: Dexiinae
- Tribe: Voriini
- Genus: Homohypochaeta; Townsend, 1927

Type species
- Homohypochaeta reclinata Townsend, 1927

Genus of flies

Homohypochaeta is a genus of flies in the family Tachinidae.

== Species ==
- Homohypochaeta reclinata Townsend, 1927
- Homohypochaeta ucayali (Townsend, 1929)

== Distribution ==
Peru.
