= Cesamorelosia =

Scientific classification
- Kingdom: Animalia
- Phylum: Arthropoda
- Class: Insecta
- Order: Diptera
- Family: Tachinidae
- Subfamily: Dexiinae
- Tribe: Voriini
- Genus: Cesamorelosia; Koçak & Kemal, 2010
- Species: C. bonasus

Binomial name
- Cesamorelosia bonasus (Reinhard, 1964)

Synonyms
- Ergolabus Reinhard, 1964; Ergolabos Guimarães, 1971

Genus of flies

Cesamorelosia is a genus of flies in the family Tachinidae. It is a monotypic genus containing only Cesamorelosia bonasus.

== Distribution ==
The genus is found in Mexico.
