= Aldrichomyia =

Scientific classification
- Kingdom: Animalia
- Phylum: Arthropoda
- Class: Insecta
- Order: Diptera
- Family: Tachinidae
- Subfamily: Dexiinae
- Tribe: Voriini
- Genus: Aldrichomyia; Özdikmen, 2006

Type species
- Brachicoma macropogon Bigot, 1889

Synonyms
- Menetus Aldrich, 1926

Genus of flies

Aldrichomyia is a genus of flies in the family Tachinidae.

== Species ==
- Aldrichomyia macropogon (Bigot, 1889)

== Distribution ==
United States.
