= Muscopteryx =

Scientific classification
- Kingdom: Animalia
- Phylum: Arthropoda
- Class: Insecta
- Order: Diptera
- Family: Tachinidae
- Subfamily: Dexiinae
- Tribe: Voriini
- Genus: Muscopteryx; Townsend, 1892

Type species
- Muscopteryx chaetosula Townsend, 1892

Synonyms
- Websteriana Walton, 1914; Psammoppia Townsend, 1915; Tarassophorus Reinhard, 1964

Genus of flies

Muscopteryx is a genus of flies in the family Tachinidae.

== Species ==
- Muscopteryx chaetosula Townsend, 1892
- Muscopteryx costalis (Coquillett, 1897)
- Muscopteryx evexa (Reinhard, 1964)
- Muscopteryx hiemalis Reinhard, 1944
- Muscopteryx hilaris Reinhard, 1944
- Muscopteryx hinei Reinhard, 1944
- Muscopteryx longiseta Reinhard, 1944
- Muscopteryx nitida Reinhard, 1944
- Muscopteryx parilis Reinhard, 1944
- Muscopteryx petentis Reinhard, 1958
