= Hyleorus =

Scientific classification
- Kingdom: Animalia
- Phylum: Arthropoda
- Class: Insecta
- Order: Diptera
- Family: Tachinidae
- Subfamily: Dexiinae
- Tribe: Voriini
- Genus: Hyleorus; Aldrich, 1926

Type species
- Hyleorus furcatus Aldrich, 1926

Synonyms
- Afroplagia Curran, 1938; Neuroplagia Townsend, 1933; Steiniomyia Townsend, 1932

Genus of flies

Hyleorus is a genus of flies in the family Tachinidae.

== Species ==
- Hyleorus arctornis Chao & Zhou, 1992
- Hyleorus elatus (Meigen, 1838)
- Hyleorus fasciatus (Curran, 1938)
- Hyleorus furcatus Aldrich, 1926
- Hyleorus hoyti Mesnil, 1974
- Hyleorus nudinerva (Villeneuve, 1920)
- Hyleorus takanoi (Mesnil, 1963)
