= Neochaetoplagia =

Scientific classification
- Kingdom: Animalia
- Phylum: Arthropoda
- Clade: Pancrustacea
- Class: Insecta
- Order: Diptera
- Family: Tachinidae
- Subfamily: Dexiinae
- Tribe: Voriini
- Genus: Neochaetoplagia; Blanchard, 1963

Type species
- Neochaetoplagia pastranai Blanchard, 1963

Genus of flies

Neochaetoplagia is a genus of flies in the family Tachinidae.

== Species ==
- Neochaetoplagia pastranai Blanchard, 1963

== Distribution ==
Argentina, Chile.
