= Polygastropteryx =

Scientific classification
- Kingdom: Animalia
- Phylum: Arthropoda
- Class: Insecta
- Order: Diptera
- Family: Tachinidae
- Subfamily: Dexiinae
- Tribe: Voriini
- Genus: Polygastropteryx; Mesnil, 1953

Type species
- Polygastropteryx bicoloripes Mesnil, 1953

Genus of flies

Polygastropteryx is a genus of flies in the family Tachinidae.

== Species ==
- Polygastropteryx bicoloripes Mesnil, 1953

== Distribution ==
India, Myanmar.
