= Minthoplagia =

Scientific classification
- Kingdom: Animalia
- Phylum: Arthropoda
- Class: Insecta
- Order: Diptera
- Family: Tachinidae
- Subfamily: Dexiinae
- Tribe: Voriini
- Genus: Minthoplagia; Townsend, 1915

Type species
- Minthoplagia rafaeli Townsend, 1915

Genus of flies

Minthoplagia is a genus of flies in the family Tachinidae.

== Species ==
- Minthoplagia gracilens (Giglio-Tos, 1893)
- Minthoplagia rafaeli Townsend, 1915
- Minthoplagia setifrons (Wulp, 1890)
