= Nanoplagia =

Scientific classification
- Kingdom: Animalia
- Phylum: Arthropoda
- Class: Insecta
- Order: Diptera
- Family: Tachinidae
- Subfamily: Dexiinae
- Tribe: Voriini
- Genus: Nanoplagia; Villeneuve, 1929

Type species
- Nanoplagia hilfii Strobl, 1902

Genus of flies

Nanoplagia is a genus of flies in the family Tachinidae.

== Species ==
- Nanoplagia hilfii (Strobl, 1902)
- Nanoplagia sinaica (Villeneuve, 1909)
