= Meledonus =

Scientific classification
- Kingdom: Animalia
- Phylum: Arthropoda
- Class: Insecta
- Order: Diptera
- Family: Tachinidae
- Subfamily: Dexiinae
- Tribe: Voriini
- Genus: Meledonus; Aldrich, 1926

Type species
- Meledonus latipennis Aldrich, 1926

Synonyms
- Althanatus Edwards & Hopwood, 1966; Athanatus Reinhard, 1947; Dyscolomyia Reinhard, 1959; Phytopsis Townsend, 1915

Genus of flies

Meledonus is a genus of flies in the family Tachinidae.

== Species ==
- Meledonus albiceps Reinhard, 1956
- Meledonus californicus (Coquillett, 1895)
- Meledonus latipennis Aldrich, 1926
- Meledonus lindensis Reinhard, 1953
- Meledonus lucinus (Reinhard, 1959)
