= Prosopochaeta anomala =

Scientific classification
- Kingdom: Animalia
- Phylum: Arthropoda
- Class: Insecta
- Order: Diptera
- Family: Tachinidae
- Genus: Prosopochaeta
- Species: P. anomala

Binomial name
- Prosopochaeta anomala Aldrich, 1934

Species of fly

Prosopochaeta anomala is a species of fly in the family Tachinidae.

== Distribution ==
Argentina, Chile.
