= Chaetonopsis =

Scientific classification
- Kingdom: Animalia
- Phylum: Arthropoda
- Class: Insecta
- Order: Diptera
- Family: Tachinidae
- Subfamily: Dexiinae
- Tribe: Voriini
- Genus: Chaetonopsis; Townsend, 1915

Type species
- Chaetonopsis spinosa Townsend, 1915

Synonyms
- Neonyctia Townsend, 1919

Genus of flies

Chaetonopsis is a genus of flies in the family Tachinidae.

== Species ==
- Chaetonopsis spinosa (Coquillett, 1899)

== Distribution ==
Canada, United States, Mexico.
