= Actinochaetopteryx =

Scientific classification
- Kingdom: Animalia
- Phylum: Arthropoda
- Class: Insecta
- Order: Diptera
- Family: Tachinidae
- Subfamily: Dexiinae
- Tribe: Voriini
- Genus: Actinochaetopteryx; Townsend, 1927

Type species
- Actinochaetopteryx actifera Townsend, 1927

Genus of flies

Actinochaetopteryx is a genus of tachinid flies in the family Tachinidae. Its members occur in the Palaearctic, Oriental, and Australasian realms.

== Species ==
- Actinochaetopteryx actifera Townsend, 1927
- Actinochaetopteryx antennalis Dear & Crosskey, 1982
- Actinochaetopteryx argentifera Shima, 1988
- Actinochaetopteryx aurifasciata Dear & Crosskey, 1982
- Actinochaetopteryx bivittata Dear & Crosskey, 1982
- Actinochaetopteryx japonica Mesnil, 1970
- Actinochaetopteryx nubifera Malloch, 1935
- Actinochaetopteryx nudibasis Malloch, 1935
- Actinochaetopteryx nudinerva Mesnil, 1953
- Actinochaetopteryx patellipalpis Richter, 1986
- Actinochaetopteryx proclinata Shima, 1988
- Actinochaetopteryx setifacies Shima, 1988
