= Halydaia aurea =

Scientific classification
- Kingdom: Animalia
- Phylum: Arthropoda
- Class: Insecta
- Order: Diptera
- Family: Tachinidae
- Subfamily: Dexiinae
- Tribe: Voriini
- Genus: Halydaia
- Species: H. aurea

Binomial name
- Halydaia aurea Egger, 1856

Synonyms
- Halydaia argentea Egger, 1856

Species of fly

Halydaia aurea is a species of fly in the family Tachinidae.

== Distribution ==
Estonia, Hungary, Poland, Romania, Ukraine, Finland, Bulgaria, Italy, Austria, France, Germany, Switzerland, Japan, Mongolia, Russia, Azerbaijan, China.
