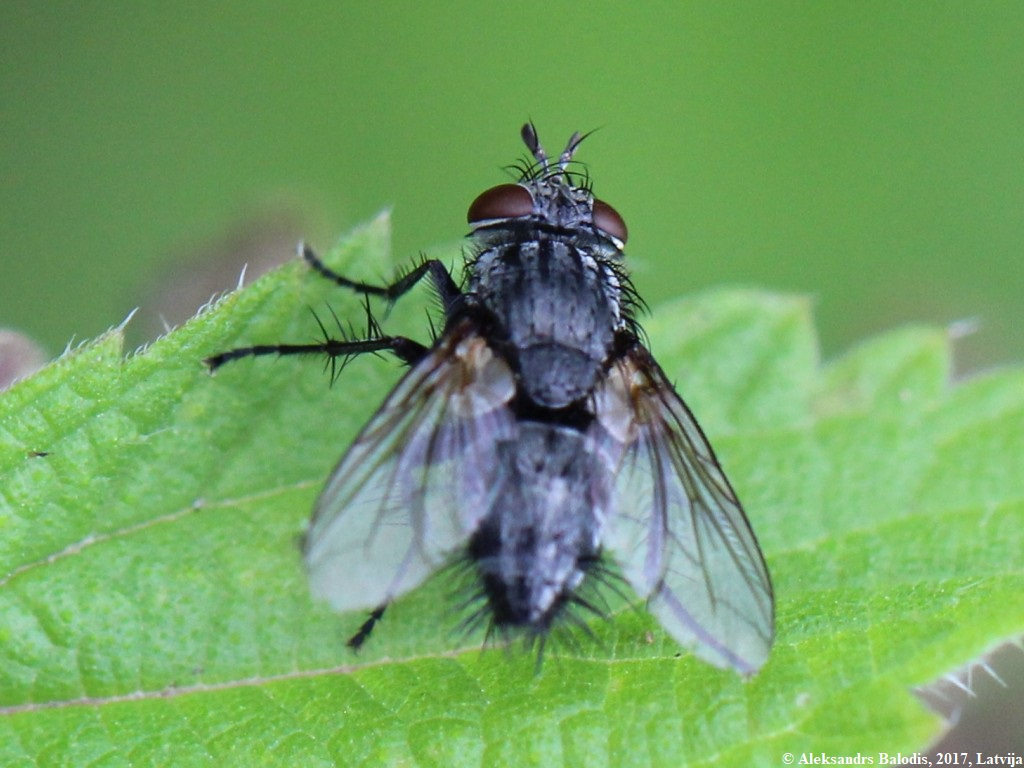
- Hypovoria hilaris

Scientific classification
- Kingdom: Animalia
- Phylum: Arthropoda
- Class: Insecta
- Order: Diptera
- Family: Tachinidae
- Subfamily: Dexiinae
- Tribe: Voriini
- Genus: Hypovoria; Villeneuve, 1913

Type species
- Voria (Hypovoria) hilaris Villeneuve, 1913

Synonyms
- Catalinovoria Townsend, 1926; Proselenus Reinhard, 1964; Sthenopleura Aldrich, 1926

= Hypovoria =

Genus of flies

Hypovoria is a genus of flies in the family Tachinidae.

== Species ==
- Hypovoria cauta (Townsend, 1926)
- Hypovoria dentata Richter, 1980
- Hypovoria discalis (Brooks, 1945)
- Hypovoria hilaris Villeneuve, 1913
- Hypovoria pilibasis (Villeneuve, 1922)
