= Uclesiella =

Scientific classification
- Kingdom: Animalia
- Phylum: Arthropoda
- Class: Insecta
- Order: Diptera
- Family: Tachinidae
- Subfamily: Dexiinae
- Tribe: Voriini
- Genus: Uclesiella; Malloch, 1938

Type species
- Uclesiella irregularis Malloch, 1938

Genus of flies

Uclesiella is a monotypic genus of flies in the family Tachinidae. The sole member species, Uclesiella irregularis, is endemic to New Zealand.

== Distribution ==
New Zealand
