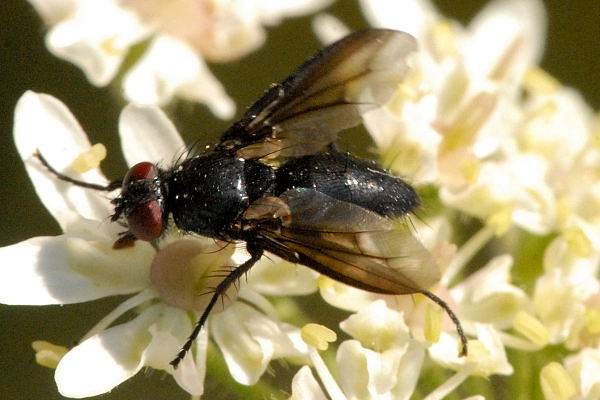

Scientific classification
- Kingdom: Animalia
- Phylum: Arthropoda
- Class: Insecta
- Order: Diptera
- Family: Tachinidae
- Subfamily: Dexiinae
- Tribe: Voriini
- Genus: Wagneria
- Species: W. costata

Binomial name
- Wagneria costata (Fallén, 1815)

Synonyms
- Carbonia impatiens Robineau-Desvoidy, 1863; Ocyptera borealis Zetterstedt, 1838; Ocyptera costata Fallén, 1815; Tachina lugens Meigen, 1824

= Wagneria costata =

Species of fly

Wagneria costata is a species of fly in the family Tachinidae.

== Distribution ==
British Isles, Czech Republic, Hungary, Latvia, Lithuania, Poland, Romania, Slovakia, Ukraine, Denmark, Finland, Norway, Sweden, Bulgaria, Italy, Slovenia, Spain, Belgium, France, Germany, Switzerland, Russia.
