= Argyromima =

Scientific classification
- Kingdom: Animalia
- Phylum: Arthropoda
- Class: Insecta
- Order: Diptera
- Family: Tachinidae
- Subfamily: Dexiinae
- Tribe: Voriini
- Genus: Argyromima; Brauer & von Berganstamm, 1889

Type species
- Argyromima mirabilis Brauer & von Bergenstamm, 1889

Genus of flies

Argyromima is a genus of flies in the family Tachinidae.

== Species ==
- Argyromima mirabilis Brauer & von Berganstamm, 1889

== Distribution ==
Ecuador.
