= Alpinoplagia =

Scientific classification
- Kingdom: Animalia
- Phylum: Arthropoda
- Clade: Pancrustacea
- Class: Insecta
- Order: Diptera
- Family: Tachinidae
- Subfamily: Dexiinae
- Tribe: Voriini
- Genus: Alpinoplagia; Townsend, 1931

Type species
- Alpinoplagia boliviana Townsend, 1931

Genus of flies

Alpinoplagia is a genus of flies in the family Tachinidae.

== Species ==
- Alpinoplagia boliviana Townsend, 1931

== Distribution ==
Bolivia, Chile.
