= Feriola =

Scientific classification
- Kingdom: Animalia
- Phylum: Arthropoda
- Class: Insecta
- Order: Diptera
- Family: Tachinidae
- Subfamily: Dexiinae
- Tribe: Voriini
- Genus: Feriola; Mesnil, 1957

Type species
- Feriola longicornis Mesnil, 1957

Genus of flies

Feriola is a genus of flies in the family Tachinidae.

== Species ==
- Feriola angustifrons Shima, 1988
- Feriola insularis Richter, 1986
- Feriola longicornis Mesnil, 1957
