= Parahypochaeta =

Scientific classification
- Kingdom: Animalia
- Phylum: Arthropoda
- Class: Insecta
- Order: Diptera
- Family: Tachinidae
- Subfamily: Dexiinae
- Tribe: Voriini
- Genus: Parahypochaeta; Brauer & von Berganstamm, 1891

Type species
- Parahypochaeta heteroneura Brauer & von Berganstamm, 1891

Synonyms
- Neocampylochaeta Townsend, 1927

Genus of flies

Parahypochaeta is a genus of flies in the family Tachinidae.

== Species ==
- Parahypochaeta genalis (Townsend, 1927)
- Parahypochaeta heteroneura Brauer & von Berganstamm, 1891
