= Myiochaeta =

Scientific classification
- Kingdom: Animalia
- Phylum: Arthropoda
- Class: Insecta
- Order: Diptera
- Family: Tachinidae
- Subfamily: Dexiinae
- Tribe: Voriini
- Genus: Myiochaeta; Cortés, 1967

Type species
- Myiochaeta marnefi Cortés, 1967

Genus of flies

Myiochaeta is a genus of flies in the family Tachinidae.

== Species ==
- Myiochaeta marnefi Cortés, 1967

== Distribution ==
Chile.
