= Comyopsis =

Scientific classification
- Kingdom: Animalia
- Phylum: Arthropoda
- Clade: Pancrustacea
- Class: Insecta
- Order: Diptera
- Family: Tachinidae
- Subfamily: Dexiinae
- Tribe: Voriini
- Genus: Comyopsis; Townsend, 1919

Genus of flies

Comyopsis is a genus of flies in the family Tachinidae.

== Species ==
- Comyopsis fumata Townsend, 1919

== Distribution ==
Puerto Rico, Trinidad and Tobago, Nicaragua.
