= Chaetovoria =

Scientific classification
- Kingdom: Animalia
- Phylum: Arthropoda
- Class: Insecta
- Order: Diptera
- Family: Tachinidae
- Subfamily: Dexiinae
- Tribe: Voriini
- Genus: Chaetovoria; Villeneuve, 1920

Type species
- Voria (Chaetovoria) antennata Villeneuve, 1920

Synonyms
- Ginglichaeta Curran, 1934; Ginglychaeta Aldrich, 1926; Pseudovoria Ringdahl, 1942

Genus of flies

Chaetovoria is a genus of flies in the family Tachinidae.

== Species ==
- Chaetovoria antennata (Villeneuve, 1920)
- Chaetovoria seriata (Aldrich, 1926)
