= Pseudodexia =

Scientific classification
- Kingdom: Animalia
- Phylum: Arthropoda
- Class: Insecta
- Order: Diptera
- Family: Tachinidae
- Subfamily: Dexiinae
- Tribe: Voriini
- Genus: Pseudodexia; Brauer & von Bergenstamm, 1891

Type species
- Dexia eques Wiedemann, 1830)

Genus of flies

Pseudodexia is a genus of flies in the family Tachinidae.

== Species ==
- Pseudodexia eques (Wiedemann, 1830)

== Distribution ==
Costa Rica, Brazil.
