= Subfischeria =

Scientific classification
- Kingdom: Animalia
- Phylum: Arthropoda
- Class: Insecta
- Order: Diptera
- Family: Tachinidae
- Subfamily: Dexiinae
- Tribe: Voriini
- Genus: Subfischeria; Villeneuve, 1937

Type species
- Subfischeria flavogrisea Villeneuve, 1937

Genus of flies

Subfischeria is a genus of flies in the family Tachinidae.

== Species ==
- Subfischeria flavogrisea Villeneuve, 1937

== Distribution ==
Botswana, Malawi, Namibia, South Africa.
