= Velardemyia =

Scientific classification
- Kingdom: Animalia
- Phylum: Arthropoda
- Clade: Pancrustacea
- Class: Insecta
- Order: Diptera
- Family: Tachinidae
- Subfamily: Dexiinae
- Tribe: Voriini
- Genus: Velardemyia; Valencia, 1972

Type species
- Velardemyia ica Valencia, 1972

Synonyms
- Verlademyia Anonymous, 1978

Genus of flies

Velardemyia is a genus of flies in the family Tachinidae.

== Species ==
- Velardemyia ica Valencia, 1972

== Distribution ==
Chile, Peru
