= Hystricovoria =

Scientific classification
- Kingdom: Animalia
- Phylum: Arthropoda
- Class: Insecta
- Order: Diptera
- Family: Tachinidae
- Subfamily: Dexiinae
- Tribe: Voriini
- Genus: Hystricovoria; Townsend, 1928

Type species
- Hystricovoria bakeri Townsend, 1928

Synonyms
- Afrororia Neave, 1950; Hystricivoria Herting & Dely-Draskovits, 1993

Genus of flies

Hystricovoria is a genus of flies in the family Tachinidae.
