= Trochilodes =

Scientific classification
- Kingdom: Animalia
- Phylum: Arthropoda
- Class: Insecta
- Order: Diptera
- Family: Tachinidae
- Subfamily: Dexiinae
- Tribe: Voriini
- Genus: Trochilodes; Coquillett, 1903

Type species
- Trochilodes skinneri Coquillett, 1903

Genus of flies

Trochilodes is a genus of flies in the family Tachinidae.

== Species ==
- Trochilodes leonardi (West, 1925)
- Trochilodes skinneri Coquillett, 1903
