= Neocyrtophoeba =

Scientific classification
- Kingdom: Animalia
- Phylum: Arthropoda
- Class: Insecta
- Order: Diptera
- Family: Tachinidae
- Subfamily: Dexiinae
- Tribe: Voriini
- Genus: Neocyrtophoeba; Vimmer & Soukup, 1940

Type species
- Neocyrtophoeba heyrovskyi Vimmer & Soukup, 1940

Genus of flies

Neocyrtophoeba is a genus of flies in the family Tachinidae.

== Species ==
- Neocyrtophoeba heyrovskyi Vimmer & Soukup, 1940

== Distribution ==
Peru.
