= Neopaedarium =

Scientific classification
- Kingdom: Animalia
- Phylum: Arthropoda
- Class: Insecta
- Order: Diptera
- Family: Tachinidae
- Subfamily: Dexiinae
- Tribe: Voriini
- Genus: Neopaedarium; Blanchard, 1943

Type species
- Neopaedarium subauratum Blanchard, 1943

Genus of flies

Neopaedarium is a genus of flies in the family Tachinidae.

== Species ==
Neopaedarium subauratum Blanchard, 1943

== Distribution ==
Argentina.
