= Prosenactia =

Scientific classification
- Kingdom: Animalia
- Phylum: Arthropoda
- Class: Insecta
- Order: Diptera
- Family: Tachinidae
- Subfamily: Dexiinae
- Tribe: Voriini
- Genus: Prosenactia; Blanchard, 1940

Type species
- Prosenactia liebermanni Blanchard, 1940

Genus of flies

Prosenactia is a genus of flies in the family Tachinidae.

== Species ==
- Prosenactia liebermanni Blanchard, 1940

== Distribution ==
Argentina.
