= Elfriedella =

Scientific classification
- Kingdom: Animalia
- Phylum: Arthropoda
- Class: Insecta
- Order: Diptera
- Family: Tachinidae
- Subfamily: Dexiinae
- Tribe: Voriini
- Genus: Elfriedella; Mesnil, 1957

Type species
- Elfriedella amoena Mesnil, 1957

Genus of flies

Elfriedella is a genus of flies in the family Tachinidae.

== Species ==
- Elfriedella amoena Mesnil, 1957
- Elfriedella flavipilosa Shima, 1988
