= Arrhinactia =

Scientific classification
- Kingdom: Animalia
- Phylum: Arthropoda
- Class: Insecta
- Order: Diptera
- Family: Tachinidae
- Subfamily: Dexiinae
- Tribe: Voriini
- Genus: Arrhinactia; Townsend, 1927

Type species
- Arrhinactia cylindrica Townsend, 1927

Synonyms
- Minthomima Townsend, 1927

Genus of flies

Arrhinactia is a genus of flies in the family Tachinidae.

== Species ==
- Arrhinactia chaetosa (Townsend, 1927)
- Arrhinactia cylindrica Townsend, 1927
