= Spiroglossa =

Scientific classification
- Kingdom: Animalia
- Phylum: Arthropoda
- Class: Insecta
- Order: Diptera
- Family: Tachinidae
- Subfamily: Dexiinae
- Tribe: Voriini
- Genus: Spiroglossa; Doleschall, 1858

Type species
- Spiroglossa tpus Doleschall, 1858

Genus of flies

Spiroglossa is a genus of flies in the family Tachinidae.

== Species ==
- Spiroglossa tpus Doleschall, 1858

== Distribution ==
Maluku Islands.
