= Thryptodexia =

Scientific classification
- Kingdom: Animalia
- Phylum: Arthropoda
- Class: Insecta
- Order: Diptera
- Family: Tachinidae
- Subfamily: Dexiinae
- Tribe: Voriini
- Genus: Thryptodexia; Malloch, 1926

Type species
- Thryptodexia polita Malloch, 1926

Genus of flies

Thryptodexia is a genus of flies in the family Tachinidae.

== Species ==
- Thryptodexia polita Malloch, 1926

== Distribution ==
Philippines.
