= Euptilopareia =

Scientific classification
- Kingdom: Animalia
- Phylum: Arthropoda
- Class: Insecta
- Order: Diptera
- Family: Tachinidae
- Subfamily: Dexiinae
- Tribe: Voriini
- Genus: Euptilopareia; Townsend, 1916

Type species
- Paraplagia erucicola Coquillett, 1897

Genus of flies

Euptilopareia is a genus of flies in the family Tachinidae.

== Species ==
- Euptilopareia erucicola (Coquillett, 1897)
- Euptilopareia vicinalis Reinhard, 1956
