= Spathidexia =

Scientific classification
- Kingdom: Animalia
- Phylum: Arthropoda
- Class: Insecta
- Order: Diptera
- Family: Tachinidae
- Subfamily: Dexiinae
- Tribe: Voriini
- Genus: Spathidexia; Townsend, 1912

Type species
- Spathidexia clemonsi Townsend, 1912

Synonyms
- Spanthidexia (Wood & Zumbado, 2010); Gymnopalpus Townsend, 1919; Minthohoughia Townsend, 1919; Minthodexiopsis Townsend, 1927; Stenaulacodoria Townsend, 1928

Genus of flies

Spathidexia is a genus of parasitic flies in the family Tachinidae.

== Species ==
- Spathidexia antillensis Arnaud, 1960
- Spathidexia atripalpus Fleming and Wood, 2015
- Spathidexia atypica Curran, 1927
- Spathidexia aurantiaca Fleming and Wood, 2015
- Spathidexia brasiliensis Arnaud, 1960
- Spathidexia cerussata Reinhard, 1934
- Spathidexia cinereicollis Wulp, 1891
- Spathidexia clemonsi Townsend, 1912
- Spathidexia creolensis Reinhard, 1955
- Spathidexia cylindrica Townsend, 1919
- Spathidexia dicta Giglio-Tos, 1893
- Spathidexia dunningii (Coquillett, 1895)
- Spathidexia elegans (Reinhard, 1964)
- Spathidexia flavicornis Brauer & von Bergenstamm, 1891
- Spathidexia hernanrodriguezi Fleming and Wood, 2015
- Spathidexia juanvialesi Fleming and Wood, 2015
- Spathidexia luisrobertogalligosi Fleming and Wood, 2015
- Spathidexia luteola Fleming and Wood, 2015
- Spathidexia marioburgosi Fleming and Wood, 2015
- Spathidexia nexa Reinhard, 1953
- Spathidexia niveomarginata Wulp, 1890
- Spathidexia pallida Wulp, 1891
- Spathidexia reinhardi Arnaud, 1960
- Spathidexia setipennis Townsend, 1919
- Spathidexia spatulata Townsend, 1928
