= Trafoia monticola =

Scientific classification
- Kingdom: Animalia
- Phylum: Arthropoda
- Class: Insecta
- Order: Diptera
- Family: Tachinidae
- Genus: Trafoia
- Species: T. monticola

Binomial name
- Trafoia monticola Brauer & von Berganstamm, 1893

Synonyms
- Erigone uncinervis Pandellé, 1896

Species of fly

Trafoia monticola is a species of fly in the family Tachinidae.

It is found in the following countries: Czech Republic, Poland, Slovakia, Norway, Sweden, Bulgaria, Italy, Serbia, Spain, Austria, France, Germany, Switzerland, and Russia.
