= Chaetoplagia =

Scientific classification
- Kingdom: Animalia
- Phylum: Arthropoda
- Class: Insecta
- Order: Diptera
- Family: Tachinidae
- Subfamily: Dexiinae
- Tribe: Voriini
- Genus: Chaetoplagia; Coquillett, 1895

Type species
- Chaetoplagia atripennis Coquillett, 1895

Genus of flies

Chaetoplagia is a genus of flies in the family Tachinidae.

== Species ==
- Chaetoplagia atripennis Coquillett, 1895

== Distribution ==
Canada, United States, Mexico.
