= Metaplagia =

Scientific classification
- Kingdom: Animalia
- Phylum: Arthropoda
- Class: Insecta
- Order: Diptera
- Family: Tachinidae
- Subfamily: Dexiinae
- Tribe: Voriini
- Genus: Metaplagia; Coquillett, 1895

Type species
- Metaplagia occidentalis Coquillett, 1895

Synonyms
- Metavoria Townsend, 1915; Agathomyia Reinhard, 1959; Anzamyia Reinhard, 1960

Genus of flies

Metaplagia is a genus of flies in the family Tachinidae.

== Species ==
- Metaplagia brevicornis Brooks, 1945
- Metaplagia cordata (Reinhard, 1959)
- Metaplagia facialis (Reinhard, 1956)
- Metaplagia latifrons (Reinhard, 1956)
- Metaplagia leahdennisae Fleming & Wood, 2021
- Metaplagia lindarobinsonae Fleming & Wood, 2021
- Metaplagia occidentalis Coquillett, 1895
- Metaplagia orientalis (Townsend, 1915)
- Metaplagia paulinesaribasae Fleming & Wood, 2021
- Metaplagia robinsherwoodae Fleming & Wood, 2021
- Metaplagia svetlanakozikae Fleming & Wood, 2021
