= Trismegistomya =

Scientific classification
- Kingdom: Animalia
- Phylum: Arthropoda
- Class: Insecta
- Order: Diptera
- Family: Tachinidae
- Subfamily: Dexiinae
- Tribe: Voriini
- Genus: Trismegistomya; Reinhard, 1967

Type species
- Trismegistus pumilis Reinhard, 1967

Synonyms
- Trismegistus Reinhard, 1967

Genus of flies

Trismegistomya is a genus of flies in the family Tachinidae.

== Species ==
- Trismegistomya jimoharai Fleming & Wood, 2019
- Trismegistomya pumilis (Reinhard, 1967)
