= Goniochaeta =

Scientific classification
- Kingdom: Animalia
- Phylum: Arthropoda
- Class: Insecta
- Order: Diptera
- Family: Tachinidae
- Subfamily: Dexiinae
- Tribe: Voriini
- Genus: Goniochaeta; Townsend, 1891

Type species
- Goniochaeta plagioides Townsend, 1891

Genus of flies

Goniochaeta is a genus of flies in the family Tachinidae.

== Species ==
- Goniochaeta fuscibasis Aldrich, 1926
- Goniochaeta plagioides Townsend, 1891
