= Allothelaira =

Scientific classification
- Kingdom: Animalia
- Phylum: Arthropoda
- Class: Insecta
- Order: Diptera
- Family: Tachinidae
- Subfamily: Dexiinae
- Tribe: Voriini
- Genus: Allothelaira; Villeneuve, 1915

Type species
- Allothelaira diaphana Villeneuve, 1915

Synonyms
- Sisyropododexia Townsend, 1927

Genus of flies

Allothelaira is a genus of flies in the family Tachinidae.

== Species ==
- Allothelaira analis (Walker, 1860)
- Allothelaira diaphana Villeneuve, 1915
- Allothelaira luteicornis (Townsend, 1927)
