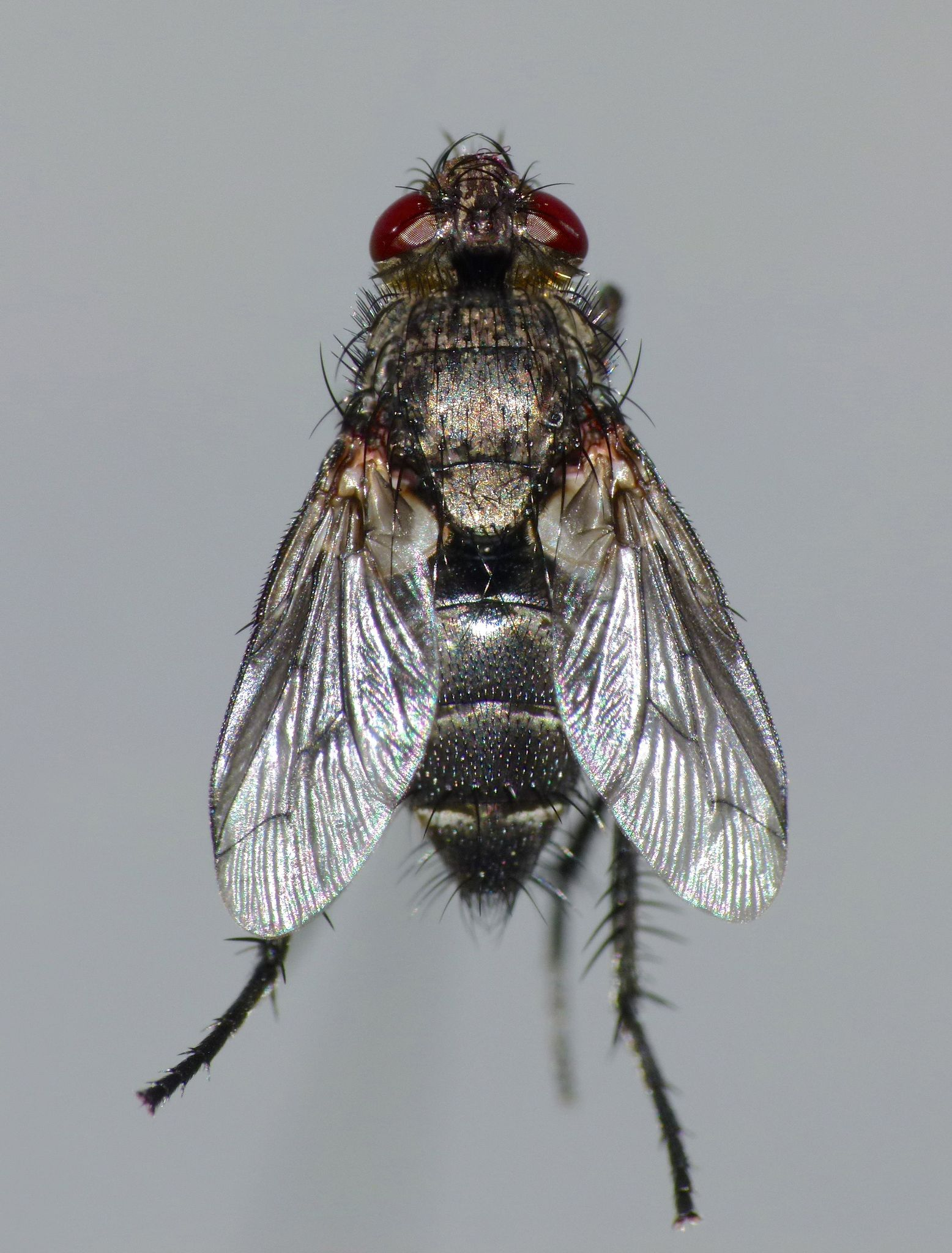
- Plagiomyia longipes

Scientific classification
- Kingdom: Animalia
- Phylum: Arthropoda
- Class: Insecta
- Order: Diptera
- Family: Tachinidae
- Subfamily: Dexiinae
- Tribe: Voriini
- Genus: Plagiomyia; Curran, 1927

Type species
- Calcager turbidum Hutton, 1901

= Plagiomyia =

Genus of flies

Plagiomyia is a genus of flies in the family Tachinidae.

== Species ==
- Plagiomyia achaeta Malloch, 1938
- Plagiomyia alticeps Malloch, 1938
- Plagiomyia longicornis Malloch, 1938
- Plagiomyia longipes Malloch, 1938
- Plagiomyia turbida (Hutton, 1901)

== Distribution ==
New Zealand.
