= Trafoia =

Scientific classification
- Kingdom: Animalia
- Phylum: Arthropoda
- Class: Insecta
- Order: Diptera
- Family: Tachinidae
- Subfamily: Dexiinae
- Tribe: Voriini
- Genus: Trafoia; Brauer & von Berganstamm, 1893

Type species
- Trafoia monticola Brauer & von Bergenstamm, 1893

Synonyms
- Charapemyia Townsend, 1919; Neotrafoia Townsend, 1912; Tenuirostra Ringdahl, 1933; Charapomyia Guimarães, 1971

Genus of flies

Trafoia is a genus of flies in the family Tachinidae.

== Species ==
- Trafoia arctica (Sack, 1923)
- Trafoia gemina Herting, 1966
- Trafoia incarum (Townsend, 1912)
- Trafoia monticola Brauer & von Berganstamm, 1893
- Trafoia rufipalpis (Bigot, 1889)
- Trafoia setulosa (Wulp, 1890)
- Trafoia trinitatis (Thompson, 1963)
