= Micronychiops =

Scientific classification
- Kingdom: Animalia
- Phylum: Arthropoda
- Clade: Pancrustacea
- Class: Insecta
- Order: Diptera
- Family: Tachinidae
- Subfamily: Dexiinae
- Tribe: Voriini
- Genus: Micronychiops; Townsend, 1915

Type species
- Micronychiops aurescens Townsend, 1915

Genus of flies

Micronychiops is a genus of flies in the family Tachinidae.

== Species ==
- Micronychiops aurescens Townsend, 1915

== Distribution ==
Peru.
