= Rhamphina (fly) =

Scientific classification
- Kingdom: Animalia
- Phylum: Arthropoda
- Class: Insecta
- Order: Diptera
- Family: Tachinidae
- Subfamily: Dexiinae
- Tribe: Voriini
- Genus: Rhamphina; Macquart, 1835

Type species
- Stomoxys pedemontana Meigen, 1824)

Synonyms
- Albertia Rondani, 1843; Ramphina Rondani, 1856; Eleone Robineau-Desvoidy, 1863; Czernya Strobl, 1910

Genus of flies

Rhamphina is a genus of bristle flies in the family Tachinidae.

== Species ==
- Rhamphina pedemontana (Meigen, 1824)
- Rhamphina rectirostris Herting, 1971
