= Heliaea mirabilis =

Scientific classification
- Kingdom: Animalia
- Phylum: Arthropoda
- Class: Insecta
- Order: Diptera
- Family: Tachinidae
- Subfamily: Dexiinae
- Tribe: Voriini
- Genus: Heliaea; Curran, 1934
- Species: H. mirabilis

Binomial name
- Heliaea mirabilis Curran, 1934

Species of fly

Heliaea is a genus of parasitic flies in the family Tachinidae, containing a single species, Heliaea mirabilis.

== Distribution ==
The species is found in Venezuela.
