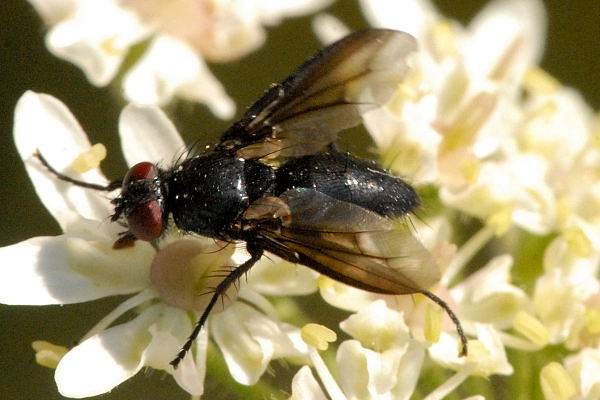
- Wagneria costata

Scientific classification
- Kingdom: Animalia
- Phylum: Arthropoda
- Class: Insecta
- Order: Diptera
- Family: Tachinidae
- Subfamily: Dexiinae
- Tribe: Voriini
- Genus: Wagneria; Robineau-Desvoidy, 1830

Type species
- Wagneria gagatea Robineau-Desvoidy, 1830

Synonyms
- Atrania Robineau-Desvoidy, 1863; Carbonia Robineau-Desvoidy, 1863; Neocalea Mesnil, 1974; Ocalea Robineau-Desvoidy, 1863; Wayneria Walker, 1849

= Wagneria =

Genus of flies

Wagneria is a genus of flies in the family Tachinidae. More junior homonyms exist of Wagneria than any other animal genus name.

== Species ==
- Wagneria albifrons Kugler, 1977
- Wagneria alpina Villeneuve, 1910
- Wagneria cornuta Curran, 1928
- Wagneria costata (Fallén, 1815)
- Wagneria cunctans (Meigen, 1824)
- Wagneria depressa Herting, 1973
- Wagneria dilatata Kugler, 1977
- Wagneria discreta Herting, 1971
- Wagneria gagatea Robineau-Desvoidy, 1830
- Wagneria heterocera (Robineau-Desvoidy, 1863)
- Wagneria lacrimans (Rondani, 1861)
- Wagneria major Curran, 1928
- Wagneria micronychia Mesnil, 1974
- Wagneria micropyga Herting, 1987
- Wagneria ocellaris Reinhard, 1955
- Wagneria pacata Reinhard, 1955
- Wagneria theodori Mesnil, 1974
- Wagneria vernata West, 1925
