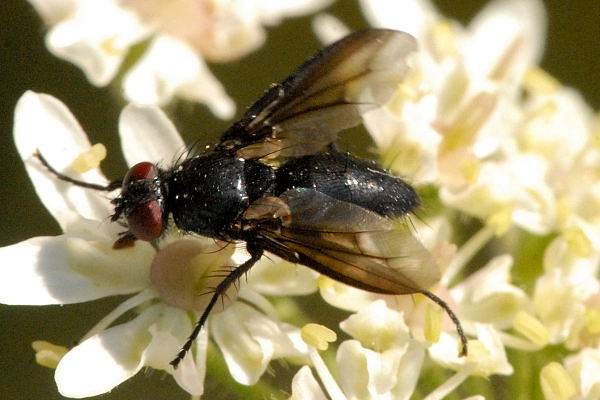
- Wagneria costata

Scientific classification
- Kingdom: Animalia
- Phylum: Arthropoda
- Class: Insecta
- Order: Diptera
- Family: Tachinidae
- Subfamily: Dexiinae
- Tribe: Voriini; Townsend, 1912

= Voriini =

Tribe of flies

Voriini is a tribe of flies in the family Tachinidae. More junior homonyms exist of Wagneria than any other animal genus name.

== Genera ==
- Actinochaetopteryx Townsend, 1927
- Actinoplagia Blanchard, 1940
- Aldrichiopa Guimarães, 1971
- Aldrichomyia Özdikmen, 2006
- Alexogloblinia Cortés, 1945
- Allothelaira Villeneuve, 1915
- Alpinoplagia Townsend, 1931
- Argyromima Brauer & von Bergenstamm, 1889
- Arrhinactia Townsend, 1927
- Ateloglutus Aldrich, 1934
- Athrycia Robineau-Desvoidy, 1830
- Bahrettinia Özdikmen, 2007
- Blepharomyia Brauer & von Bergenstamm, 1889
- Calcager Hutton, 1901
- Calcageria Curran, 1927
- Campylocheta Rondani, 1859
- Cesamorelosia Koçak & Kemal, 2010
- Chaetodemoticus Brauer & von Bergenstamm, 1891
- Chaetonopsis Townsend, 1915
- Chaetoplagia Coquillett, 1895
- Chaetovoria Villeneuve, 1920
- Chiloclista Townsend, 1931
- Cockerelliana Townsend, 1915
- Comyopsis Townsend, 1919
- Coracomyia Aldrich, 1934
- Cowania Reinhard, 1952
- Cyrtophloeba Rondani, 1856
- Dexiomimops Townsend, 1926
- Dischotrichia Cortés, 1944
- Doliolomyia Reinhard, 1975
- Elfriedella Mesnil, 1957
- Engeddia Kugler, 1977
- Eriothrix Meigen, 1803
- Eulasiona Townsend, 1892
- Euptilopareia Townsend, 1916
- Feriola Mesnil, 1957
- Ganopleuron Aldrich, 1934
- Goniochaeta Townsend, 1891
- Halydaia Egger, 1856
- Haracca Richter, 1995
- Heliaea Curran, 1934
- Homohypochaeta Townsend, 1927
- Hyleorus Aldrich, 1926
- Hypochaetopsis Townsend, 1915
- Hypovoria Villeneuve, 1913
- Hystricovoria Townsend, 1928
- Itamintho Townsend, 1931
- Kirbya Robineau-Desvoidy, 1830
- Klugia Robineau-Desvoidy, 1863
- Leptomacquartia Townsend, 1919
- Leptothelaira Mesnil & Shima, 1979
- Meledonus Aldrich, 1926
- Meleterus Aldrich, 1926
- Metaplagia Coquillett, 1895
- Metopomuscopteryx Townsend, 1915
- Micronychiops Townsend, 1915
- Microplagia Townsend, 1915
- Minthoplagia Townsend, 1915
- Muscopteryx Townsend, 1892
- Myiochaeta Cortés, 1967
- Myioclura Reinhard, 1975
- Myiophasiopsis Townsend, 1927
- Nanoplagia Villeneuve, 1929
- Nardia Cerretti, 2009
- Neochaetoplagia Blanchard, 1963
- Neocyrtophoeba Vimmer & Soukup, 1940
- Neopaedarium Blanchard, 1943
- Neosolieria Townsend, 1927
- Neotrafoiopsis Townsend, 1931
- Nephochaetona Townsend, 1919
- Nephoplagia Townsend, 1919
- Nothovoria Cortés & González, 1989
- Pachynocera Townsend, 1919
- Paedarium Aldrich, 1926
- Parahypochaeta Brauer & von Bergenstamm, 1891
- Parodomyiops Townsend, 1935
- Periscepsia Gistel, 1848
- Peteina Meigen, 1838
- Phaeodema Aldrich, 1934
- Phasiophyto Townsend, 1919
- Phyllomya Robineau-Desvoidy, 1830
- Piriona Aldrich, 1928
- Plagiomima Brauer & von Bergenstamm, 1891
- Plagiomyia Curran, 1927
- Polygaster Wulp, 1890
- Polygastropteryx Mesnil, 1953
- Prosenactia Blanchard, 1940
- Prosheliomyia Brauer & von Bergenstamm, 1891
- Prosopochaeta Macquart, 1851
- Pseudodexia Brauer & von Bergenstamm, 1891
- Reichardia Karsch, 1886
- Rhamphina Macquart, 1835
- Rhombothyria Wulp, 1891
- Solomonilla Özdikmen, 2007
- Spathidexia Townsend, 1912
- Spiroglossa Doleschall, 1858
- Squamomedina Townsend, 1934
- Stenodexia Wulp, 1891
- Stomina Robineau-Desvoidy, 1830
- Subfischeria Villeneuve, 1937
- Thelaira Robineau-Desvoidy, 1830
- Thelairodes Wulp, 1891
- Thryptodexia Malloch, 1926
- Trafoia Brauer & von Bergenstamm, 1893
- Trichodischia Bigot, 1885
- Trichopyrrhosia Townsend, 1927
- Trismegistomya Reinhard, 1967
- Trochilochaeta Townsend, 1940
- Trochilodes Coquillett, 1903
- Uclesia Girschner, 1901
- Uclesiella Malloch, 1938
- Velardemyia Valencia, 1972
- Voria Robineau-Desvoidy, 1830
- Wagneria Robineau-Desvoidy, 1830
- Xanthodexia Wulp, 1891
- Xanthopteromyia Townsend, 1926
- Zonalia Curran, 1934
