= P. fenestrata =

P. fenestrata may refer to:

- Phasia fenestrata, Bigot, 1889, a tachinid fly species
- Pipiza fenestrata, Meigen, 1822, a hoverfly species
- Platypleura fenestrata, Uhler, 1862, a bug species
- Pleomeliola fenestrata, a fungus species
- Pterocalla fenestrata, a species of picture-winged fly
- Pterocerina fenestrata, a species of picture-winged fly

== See also ==
- Fenestrata (disambiguation)
