= Salina aurantiamaculata =

Scientific classification
- Kingdom: Animalia
- Phylum: Arthropoda
- Clade: Pancrustacea
- Class: Collembola
- Order: Entomobryomorpha
- Family: Paronellidae
- Genus: Salina
- Species: S. aurantiamaculata

Binomial name
- Salina aurantiamaculata Mandal, Mandal, Kar, 2025

Species of springtail

Salina aurantiamaculata is a species of springtail in the family Entomobryidae. It was formally described as a new species by Pritha Mandal, Guru Pada Mandal and Surajit Kar in 2025, together with Salina pseudomontana. The species was described from Purulia district, West Bengal, India, and belongs to the genus Salina.

== Discovery ==
Salina aurantiamaculata was formally described as a new species by Pritha Mandal, Guru Pada Mandal and Surajit Kar in 2025. The type material of S. aurantiamaculata was collected from the Arsha Range Office in Purulia district, West Bengal, India, at an elevation of 326 m. The holotype is a female specimen collected on 13 October 2022 by G. P. Mandal; the type series also includes a male and a subadult as paratypes. The specimens were registered in the collections of the Zoological Survey of India.

== Description ==
Salina aurantiamaculata is a small springtail with an average adult body length of about 1.83 mm (head and trunk combined, n = 3). Its general body colour is pale yellow, with conspicuous bright-orange pigmentation. The orange pigment forms a broad band around the head and continues along the lateral margins of thoracic segment II and abdominal segments I–III. Orange pigmentation is also present as patches on the anterior and posterior portions of abdominal segments IV–VI. The orange areas are outlined by a faint blue colour. The species also has blue pigment patches on the legs and antennal segments, as well as on the medial part of abdominal segment III and the ventral surface of the body. Its chaetotaxy—the arrangement of body chaetae (bristles)—provides important diagnostic characters. The authors noted specific chaetotaxy patterns on the thoracic and abdominal segments, including 0–1, 2, 2 and 2 central mac on thoracic segment II through abdominal segment II, respectively, and 10–12 central mac on abdominal segment IV, with Be2 sometimes absent. Salina aurantiamaculata is assigned to the Salina celebensis species group, based on characters including the chaetotaxy of abdominal segment II, reduced dorsal body chaetae and a relatively short mucro. Its bright-orange pigmentation resembles that of S. maculipenis and S. speciosa, but the new species differs from these species in its body pigmentation pattern and chaetotaxy.

The original description included detailed illustrations of the species' labral and labial chaetotaxy, maxillary outer lobe, antennal structures, dorsal head chaetotaxy, postlabial chaetotaxy and hind claw, together with comparative tables for distinguishing it from other Salina species.
