= P. ferruginea =

P. ferruginea may refer to:

- Pimenta ferruginea, a plant species endemic to Cuba
- Prumnopitys ferruginea, the Miro, an evergreen coniferous tree species endemic to New Zealand
- Pseudomyrmex ferruginea, the acacia ant, an insect species
- Pterocerina ferruginea, a picture-winged fly species
- Puya ferruginea, a plant species native to Bolivia and Ecuador

== Synonyms ==
- Pinalia ferruginea, a synonym for Eria ferruginea, an orchid species

== See also ==
- Ferruginea (disambiguation)
