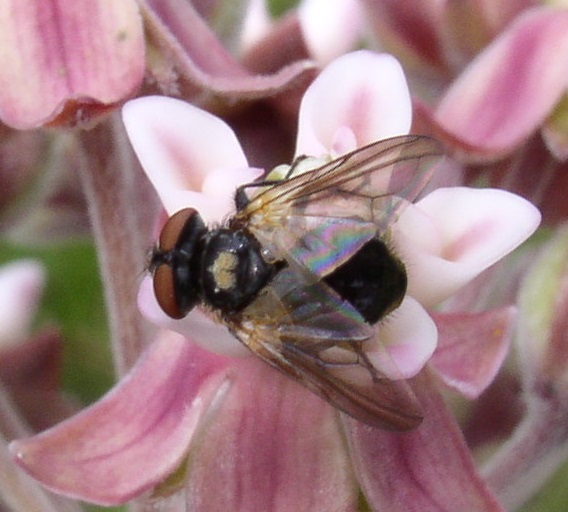
- P. aurulans on common milkweed

Scientific classification
- Kingdom: Animalia
- Phylum: Arthropoda
- Clade: Pancrustacea
- Class: Insecta
- Order: Diptera
- Family: Tachinidae
- Subfamily: Phasiinae
- Tribe: Phasiini
- Genus: Phasia
- Species: P. aurulans

Binomial name
- Phasia aurulans Meigen, 1824

Synonyms
- Alophora aurulans Girschner, 1887; Alophora splendida Coquillett, 1902; Phasiomyia meliceris Reinhard, 1955; Alophora aurulans Stein, 1924; Allophorella aurulans Dupuis, 1963; Alophora aurulans Draber-Monko, 1965; Phasiomyia splendida Sabrosky and Arnaud, 1965

= Phasia aurulans =

Species of fly

Phasia aurulans is a species of tachinid fly.

== Description ==
Body length 7-9mm. It has a broad distribution across the Holarctic, range spanning from North America (Canada and the United States) and also widespread in Europe and Asia, including countries like Belarus, Japan and Russia.

== Distribution ==
Canada, United States, Belarus, Czech Republic, Hungary, Moldova, Poland, Romania, Slovakia, Ukraine, Finland, Norway, Bulgaria, Croatia, Italy, Austria, Belgium, France, Germany, Netherlands, Switzerland, Japan, Kazakhstan, South Korea, Russia.

== Hosts ==
Hemiptera - Elasmucha lateralis
