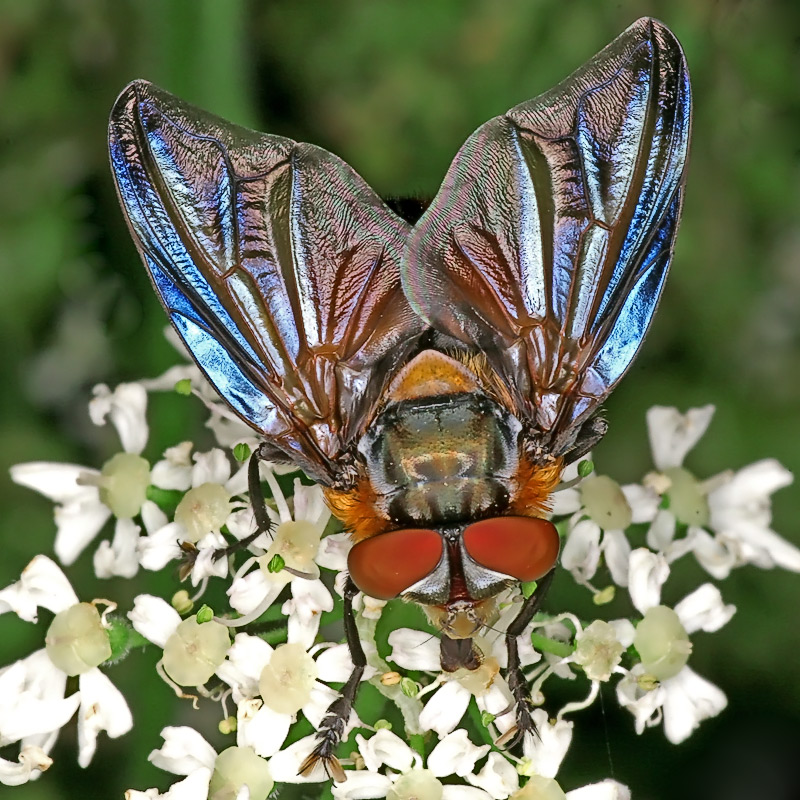
- P. hemiptera male on flower

Scientific classification
- Kingdom: Animalia
- Phylum: Arthropoda
- Clade: Pancrustacea
- Class: Insecta
- Order: Diptera
- Family: Tachinidae
- Subfamily: Phasiinae
- Tribe: Phasiini
- Genus: Phasia; Latreille, 1804

Type species
- Conops subcoleoptratus Linnaeus, 1767

Synonyms
- Akosempomyia Villeneuve, 1932; Alaphora Rossi, 1849; Allophora Mik, 1894; Alophora Robineau-Desvoidy, 1830; Alophorella Townsend, 1912; Alophorophasia Townsend, 1927; Alophoropsis Townsend, 1915; Androeuryops Beneway, 1961; Barbella Draber-Monko, 1965; Besserioides Curran, 1938; Brumptallophora Dupuis, 1949; Campbellia Miller, 1923; Epaulophasia Townsend, 1934; Euphorantha Townsend, 1915; Halophora Agassiz, 1846; Heyneophasia Townsend, 1934; Hyalomya Robineau-Desvoidy, 1830; Kosempomyia Villeneuve, 1932; Mormonomyia Brauer & von Berganstamm, 1891; Oedematopteryx Townsend, 1916; Parallophora Bezzi, 1907; Paralophora Girschner, 1887; Paraphasia Townsend, 1915; Paraphasiana Townsend, 1940; Paraphorantha Townsend, 1915; Phasiomyia Townsend, 1915; Phorantha Rondani, 1861; Phoranthella Brooks, 1945; Stackelbergella Draber-Monko, 1965; Tayloria Malloch, 1930; Thereva Fabricius, 1798; Trichophasia Townsend, 1939; Xanthotrichius Townsend, 1934; Xiphophasia Townsend, 1937

= Phasia =

Genus of flies

Phasia is a genus of flies in the family Tachinidae.

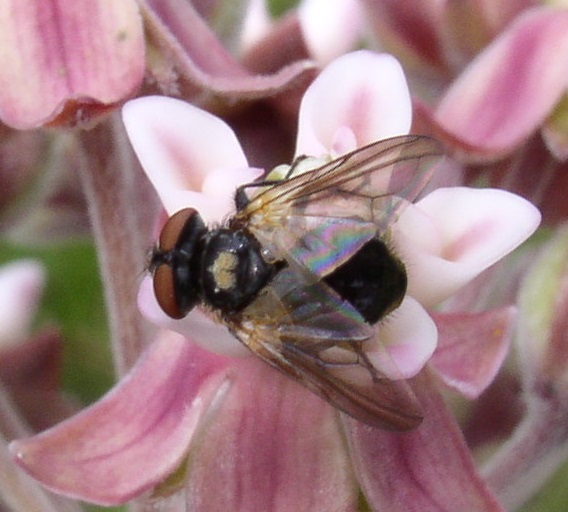
Phasia aurulans on common milkweed

== Species ==
- Phasia aeneoventris (Williston, 1886)
- Phasia africana Sun, 2003
- Phasia alata (Townsend, 1927)
- Phasia albipennis (Brooks, 1945)
- Phasia albopunctata (Baranov, 1935)
- Phasia aldrichii (Townsend, 1891)
- Phasia argenticeps (Wulp, 1892)
- Phasia argentifrons Walker, 1849
- Phasia aurigera (Egger, 1860)
- Phasia aurulans Meigen, 1824
- Phasia australiensis Sun, 2003
- Phasia barbifrons (Girschner, 1887)
- Phasia bifurca Sun, 2003
- Phasia brachyptera Sun, 2003
- Phasia brasiliensis (Townsend, 1938)
- Phasia campbelli (Miller, 1923)
- Phasia cana Sun, 2003
- Phasia capitata (Townsend, 1927)
- Phasia caudata (Villeneuve, 1932)
- Phasia chilensis (Macquart, 1851)
- Phasia clavigralla Sun, 2003
- Phasia cylindrata Sun, 2003
- Phasia distincta Sun, 2003
- Phasia diversa (Coquillett, 1897)
- Phasia dysderci (Townsend, 1940)
- Phasia dysiderci (Townsend, 1938)
- Phasia ecitonis (Townsend, 1897)
- Phasia emdeni (Draber-Monko, 1970)
- Phasia faceta Sun, 2003
- Phasia fenestrata (Bigot, 1889)
- Phasia freyreisii Wiedemann, 1830
- Phasia frontata Sun, 2003
- Phasia furcata Sun, 2003
- Phasia girschneri (Draber-Monko, 1965)
- Phasia glauca (Aldrich, 1934)
- Phasia godfreyi (Draber-Monko, 1964)
- Phasia grandis (Coquillett, 1897)
- Phasia grazynae (Draber-Monko, 1965)
- Phasia hebes (Wulp, 1892)
- Phasia hemiptera (Fabricius, 1794)
- Phasia heynei (Townsend, 1934)
- Phasia hippobosca (Paramonov, 1958)
- Phasia indica (Mesnil, 1953)
- Phasia japanensis Sun, 2003
- Phasia jeanneli (Mesnil, 1953)
- Phasia kudoi Sun, 2003
- Phasia latifrons (Paramonov, 1958)
- Phasia lauta Sun, 2003
- Phasia lepidofera (Malloch, 1929)
- Phasia luctuosa (Bigot, 1889)
- Phasia malaisei Sun, 2003
- Phasia malayana Sun, 2003
- Phasia mathisi Sun, 2003
- Phasia mendesi (Townsend, 1938)
- Phasia mesnili (Draber-Monko, 1965)
- Phasia metallica (Aldrich, 1934)
- Phasia micans (Wulp, 1883)
- Phasia minima Sun, 2003
- Phasia moerens (Wulp, 1892)
- Phasia multisetosa (Villeneuve, 1923)
- Phasia munda (Wulp, 1892)
- Phasia nasalis (Bezzi, 1908)
- Phasia nasuta (Loew, 1852)
- Phasia nigra (Brooks, 1945)
- Phasia nigrens (Wulp, 1892)
- Phasia nigrofimbriata (Villeneuve, 1935)
- Phasia nigromaculata Sun, 2003
- Phasia normalis (Curran, 1927)
- Phasia noskiewiczi (Draber-Monko, 1965)
- Phasia obesa (Fabricius, 1798)
- Phasia ochromyoides (Walker, 1865)
- Phasia officialis (Townsend, 1934)
- Phasia pandellei (Dupuis, 1957)
- Phasia piceipes (Wulp, 1892)
- Phasia politana (Townsend, 1938)
- Phasia punctigera (Townsend, 1891)
- Phasia purpurascens (Townsend, 1891)
- Phasia pusilla Meigen, 1824
- Phasia robertsonii (Townsend, 1891)
- Phasia robusta (Brooks, 1945)
- Phasia rohdendorfi (Draber-Monko, 1965)
- Phasia rotundata Sun, 2003
- Phasia rubida (Mesnil, 1953)
- Phasia rufiventris (Macquart, 1851)
- Phasia sensua (Curran, 1927)
- Phasia serrata Sun, 2003
- Phasia siberica Sun, 2003
- Phasia sichuanensis Sun, 2003
- Phasia singuliseta Sun, 2003
- Phasia subcoleoptrata (Linnaeus, 1767)
- Phasia subnitida Sun, 2003
- Phasia subopaca (Coquillett, 1897)
- Phasia sumatrana Sun, 2003
- Phasia takanoi (Draber-Monko, 1965)
- Phasia testacea (Malloch, 1930)
- Phasia theodori (Draber-Monko, 1965)
- Phasia tibialis (Villeneuve, 1932)
- Phasia transita (Townsend, 1939)
- Phasia transvaalensis Sun, 2003
- Phasia triangulata Sun, 2003
- Phasia truncata Herting, 1983
- Phasia ushpayacua (Townsend, 1937)
- Phasia varicolor (Curran, 1927)
- Phasia venturii (Draber-Monko, 1965)
- Phasia villosa (Wulp, 1892)
- Phasia violaceiventris (Brauer, 1898)
- Phasia violascens (Townsend, 1897)
- Phasia wangi Sun, 2003
- Phasia woodi Sun, 2003
- Phasia xenos (Townsend, 1934)
- Phasia xuei Wang, Wang & Zhang, 2014
- Phasia yunnanica Sun, 2003
- Phasia zimini (Draber-Monko, 1965)
