= Bay-rum tree =

Bay-rum tree sometimes is used as a reference to two plants:

- Myrica, also known as bayberry, from family Myricaceae, used to produce bayberry wax
- Pimenta racemosa, also known as West Indian Bay tree, from family Myrtaceae, used to produce bay rum
