= Uclesia fumipennis =

Scientific classification
- Kingdom: Animalia
- Phylum: Arthropoda
- Class: Insecta
- Order: Diptera
- Family: Tachinidae
- Subfamily: Dexiinae
- Tribe: Voriini
- Genus: Uclesia
- Species: U. fumipennis

Binomial name
- Uclesia fumipennis Girschner, 1901

Species of fly

Uclesia fumipennis is a species of fly in the family Tachinidae.

== Distribution ==
Portugal, Spain, Morocco.
