= Salina mulcahyae =

Scientific classification
- Domain: Eukaryota
- Kingdom: Animalia
- Phylum: Arthropoda
- Class: Collembola
- Order: Entomobryomorpha
- Family: Paronellidae
- Genus: Salina
- Species: S. mulcahyae

Binomial name
- Salina mulcahyae Christiansen & Bellinger, 1980

Species of springtail

Salina mulcahyae is a species of elongate-bodied springtails in the family Paronellidae.
