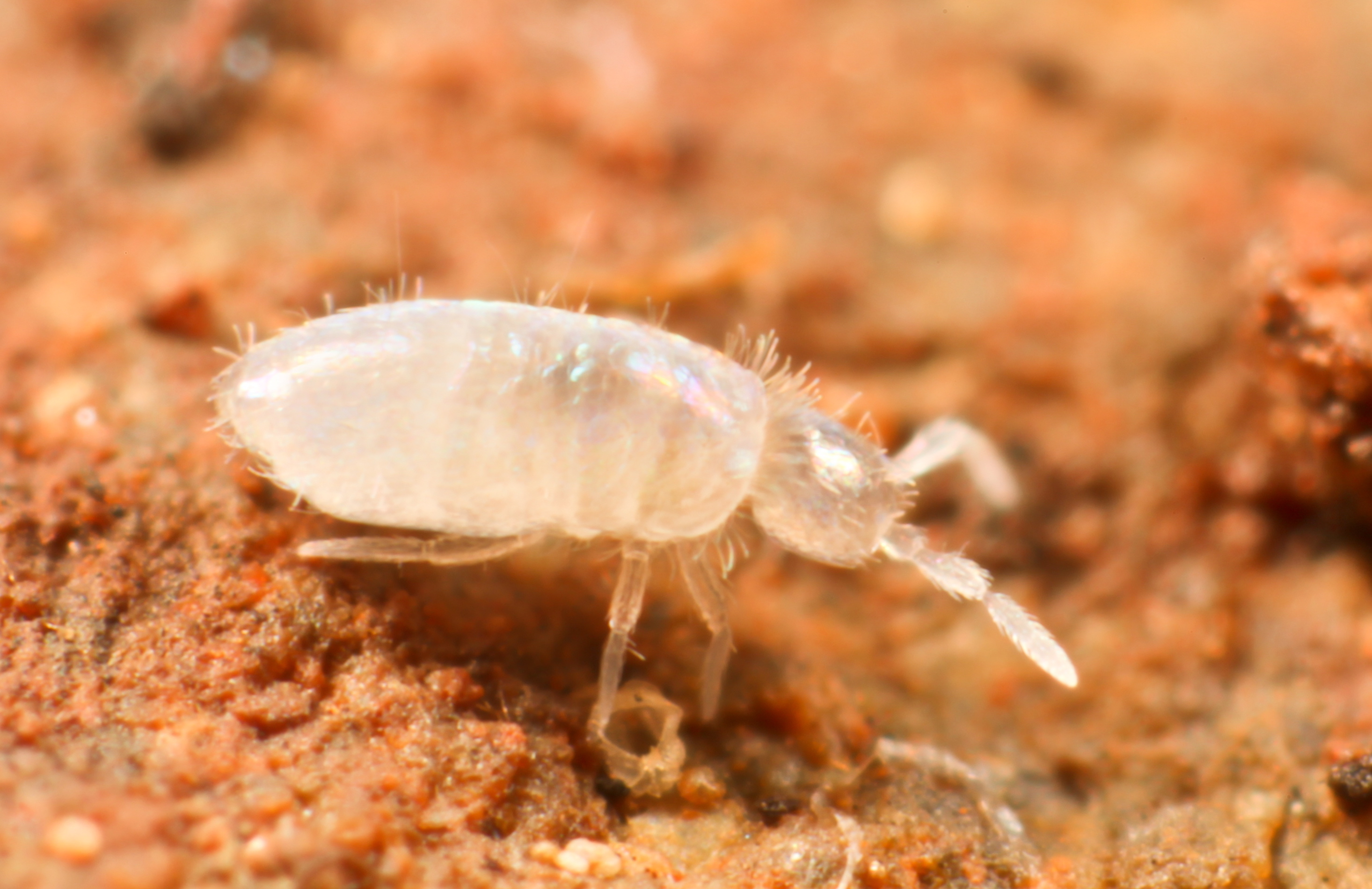

Scientific classification
- Kingdom: Animalia
- Phylum: Arthropoda
- Class: Collembola
- Order: Entomobryomorpha
- Family: Paronellidae
- Genus: Cyphoderus
- Species: C. albinus

Binomial name
- Cyphoderus albinus Nicolet, 1842

Synonyms
- Beckia albinos; Beckia argentea; Camponotus albinos; Cyphodeirus albinus; Cyphodeirus albus; Cyphodeirus argentus; Cyphoderus albinos; Cyphoderus argenta; Cyphoderus argentea; Lepidocyrtus argentatus

= Cyphoderus albinus =

Species of springtail

Cyphoderus albinus is a species of springtail in the family Paronellidae. The species is widespread in Europe going as far as the Azores of Portugal and east towards Russia.

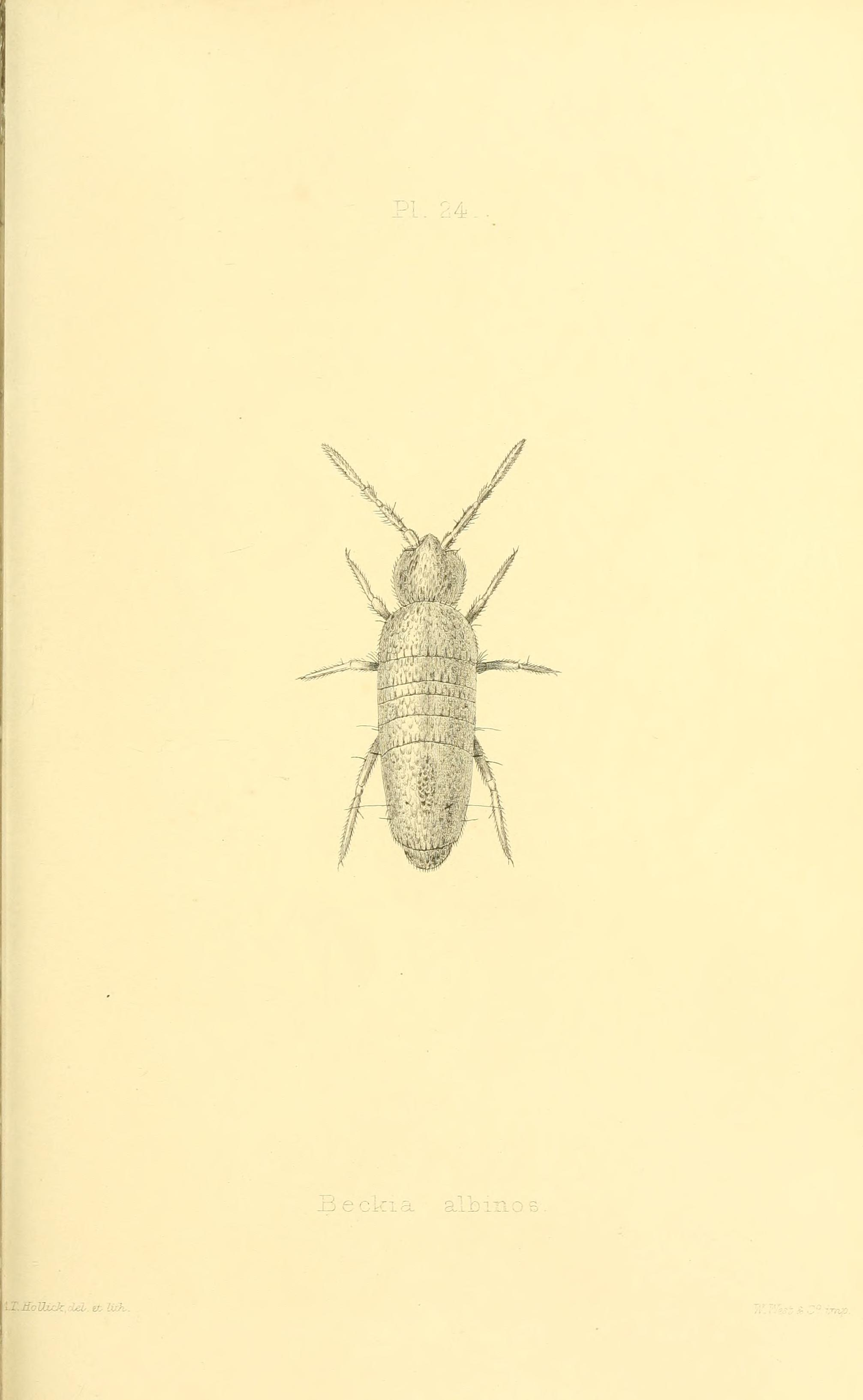
Illustration of C. albinus.
