= P. colorata =

P. colorata may refer to:

- Pseudowintera colorata, a woody evergreen flowering tree species endemic to New Zealand
- Psychotria colorata, a plant species found in Brazil
- Pterocerina colorata, a picture-winged fly species

== See also ==
- Colorata
