= Uclesia =

Scientific classification
- Kingdom: Animalia
- Phylum: Arthropoda
- Class: Insecta
- Order: Diptera
- Family: Tachinidae
- Subfamily: Dexiinae
- Tribe: Voriini
- Genus: Uclesia; Girschner, 1901

Type species
- Uclesia fumipennis Girschner, 1901

Synonyms
- Atractouclesia Townsend, 1931; Euclesia Aldrich, 1926; Mesnilovoria Aguilar, 1957; Uclesiopsis Townsend, 1931

Genus of flies

Uclesia is a genus of flies in the family Tachinidae.

== Species ==
- Uclesia antiqua Mesnil, 1963
- Uclesia brevinervis Mesnil, 1974
- Uclesia excavata Herting, 1973
- Uclesia fumipennis Girschner, 1901
- Uclesia melancholica (Mesnil, 1953)
- Uclesia nigrescens (Mesnil, 1953)
- Uclesia petiolata (Villeneuve, 1929)
- Uclesia retracta (Aldrich, 1926)
- Uclesia simyrae Herting, 1966
- Uclesia varicornis Curran, 1927
- Uclesia zonalis Curran, 1927
