= Trogolaphysa carpenteri =

Scientific classification
- Domain: Eukaryota
- Kingdom: Animalia
- Phylum: Arthropoda
- Class: Collembola
- Order: Entomobryomorpha
- Family: Paronellidae
- Genus: Trogolaphysa
- Species: T. carpenteri

Binomial name
- Trogolaphysa carpenteri (Palacios-Vargas, Ojeda, & Christiansen, 1985)

Species of springtail

Trogolaphysa carpenteri is a species of aquatic springtail that is known from Argentina, Costa Rica, Mexico, and Cayenne, French Guiana.
