= Cyphoderus similis =

Scientific classification
- Domain: Eukaryota
- Kingdom: Animalia
- Phylum: Arthropoda
- Class: Collembola
- Order: Entomobryomorpha
- Family: Paronellidae
- Genus: Cyphoderus
- Species: C. similis

Binomial name
- Cyphoderus similis Folsom, 1927

Synonyms
- Cyphoderus assimilis Boemer Of Christiansen, 1950

Species of springtail

Cyphoderus similis is a species of elongate-bodied springtail in the family Paronellidae. It is myrmecophilic and has been found using Solenopsis invicta in a relationship of phoresis.
