= Phasia barbifrons =

- Phasia barbifrons (video)

Scientific classification
- Kingdom: Animalia
- Phylum: Arthropoda
- Clade: Pancrustacea
- Class: Insecta
- Order: Diptera
- Family: Tachinidae
- Subfamily: Phasiinae
- Tribe: Phasiini
- Genus: Phasia
- Species: P. barbifrons

Binomial name
- Phasia barbifrons (Girschner, 1887)

Synonyms
- Alophora barbifrons Girschner, 1887

Species of fly

Phasia barbifrons is a European species of fly in the family Tachinidae.

== Distribution ==
British Isles, Czech Republic, Hungary, Lithuania, Poland, Slovakia, Denmark, Finland, Sweden, Andorra, Italy, Portugal, Spain, Austria, Belgium, France, Germany, Liechtenstein, Netherlands, Switzerland, Russia, Vietnam, China.
