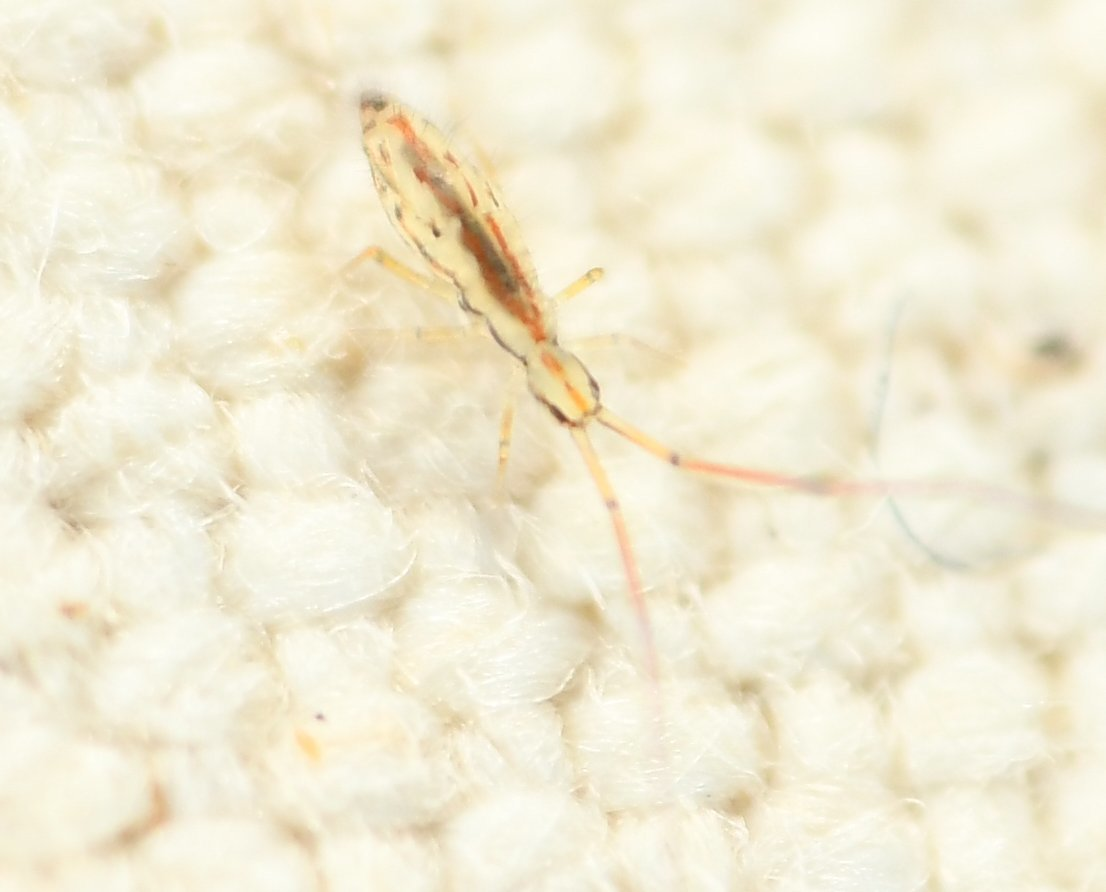

Scientific classification
- Domain: Eukaryota
- Kingdom: Animalia
- Phylum: Arthropoda
- Class: Collembola
- Order: Entomobryomorpha
- Family: Paronellidae
- Genus: Salina
- Species: S. banksi

Binomial name
- Salina banksi Macgillivray, 1894

Synonyms
- Salina decorata Mills, 1932

= Salina banksi =

Species of springtail

Salina banksi is a species of elongate-bodied springtail in the family Paronellidae.
