= P. nigricauda =

P. nigricauda may refer to:

- Phaonia nigricauda, Malloch, 1918, a fly species in the genus Phaonia
- Pterocerina nigricauda, a picture-winged fly species

== See also ==
- Nigricauda (disambiguation)
