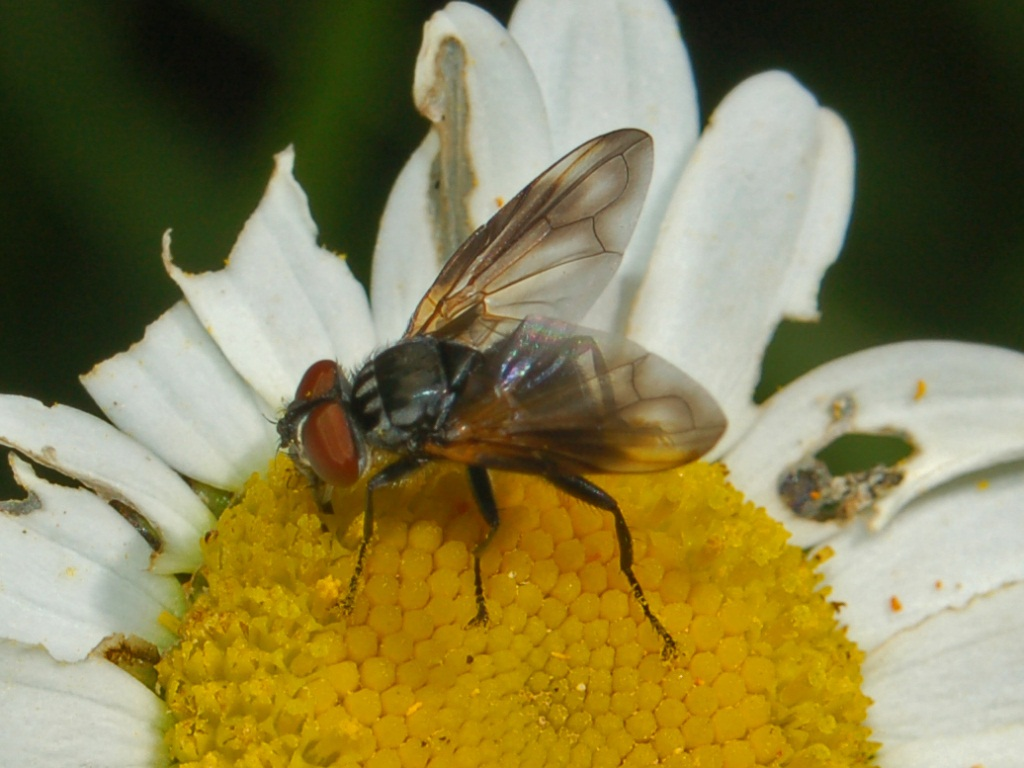
- Phasia obesa, male

Scientific classification
- Kingdom: Animalia
- Phylum: Arthropoda
- Class: Insecta
- Order: Diptera
- Family: Tachinidae
- Subfamily: Phasiinae
- Tribe: Phasiini
- Genus: Phasia
- Species: P. obesa

Binomial name
- Phasia obesa (Fabricius, 1798)

Synonyms
- Hyalomya areolaris Rondani, 1861; Hyalomya atra Robineau-Desvoidy, 1863; Hyalomya caerulescens Robineau-Desvoidy, 1863; Hyalomya fuligipennis Rondani, 1861; Hyalomya fuscana Robineau-Desvoidy, 1863; Hyalomya fuscipennis Macquart, 1835; Hyalomya murina Rondani, 1861; Hyalomya nebulosa Robineau-Desvoidy, 1830; Hyalomya nitida Robineau-Desvoidy, 1863; Hyalomya obesa var. fascipennis Girschner, 1886; Hyalomya obesa var. fuscipennis Girschner, 1886; Hyalomya obesa var. latipennis Girschner, 1886; Hyalomya obesa var. nebulosa Girschner, 1886; Hyalomya purpurea Robineau-Desvoidy, 1863; Hyalomya tomentosa Rondani, 1868; Hyalomyia obesa var. umbripennis Girschner, 1886; Musca nebulosa Panzer, 1798; Phasia aenea Roser, 1840; Phasia albipennis Meigen, 1824; Phasia atropurpurea Meigen, 1824; Phasia flavipennis Zetterstedt, 1844; Phasia grisea Zetterstedt, 1844; Phasia hamata Meigen, 1824; Phasia nervosa Meigen, 1824; Phasia nubeculosa Meigen, 1824; Phasia speciosa Curtis, 1838; Phasia umbipennis Meigen, 1824; Phasia umbrata Zetterstedt, 1844; Phasia umbripennis Meigen, 1824; Phasia violacea Meigen, 1824; Thereva cinerea Fabricius, 1805; Thereva muscaria Fallén, 1815; Thereva obesa Fabricius, 1798

= Phasia obesa =

Species of fly

Phasia obesa is a species of 'parasitic flies' belonging to the family Tachinidae subfamily Phasiinae.

== Distribution ==
This fly is present across the palaearctic ecozone, the British Isles, the Czech Republic, Estonia, Hungary, Lithuania, Poland, Romania, Slovakia, Ukraine, Denmark, Finland, Norway, Sweden, Bosnia and Herzegovina, Bulgaria, Corsica, Croatia, Cyprus, Greece, Italy, Portugal, Serbia, Slovenia, Spain, Turkey, Austria, Belgium, France, Germany, Liechtenstein, Netherlands, Switzerland, Japan, Kazakhstan, Iran, Israel, Lebanon, Palestine, Mongolia, Morocco, Russia, China and Transcaucasia.

== Description ==
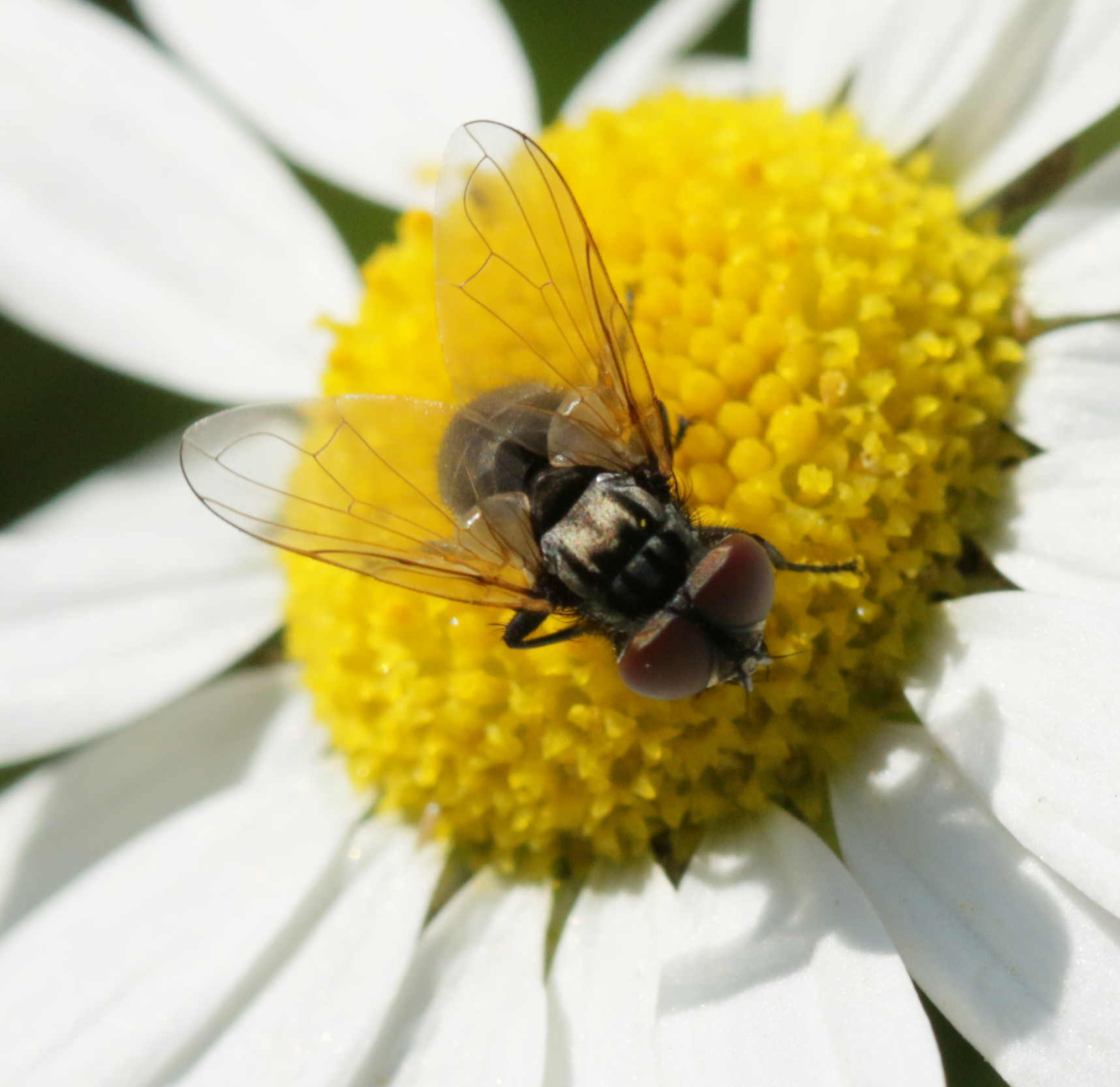
Female

The adults grow up to 4–6 millimetres (0.16–0.24 in) long. Their large compound eyes are reddish. Antenna, including arista, are black. The body is greyish, with four longitudinal black bands interspersed with clear bands of the same thickness on mesonotum. The side of thorax shows black setae. The abdomen is black. The large wings show a light brownish shading. The cell R5 is closed at the edge. Basicostae are black. In the males eyes are separated by a distance narrower than the ocellar triangle.

== Biology ==
Adults can mostly be encountered from June through September feeding on nectar of flowers (especially of Asteraceae species).

Larvae of Phasia obesa are parasitoids on adults or nymphs of various species of plant bugs (Neottiglossa sp. and Zicrona caerulea Pentatomidae, Leptopterna dolabrata and Beosus maritimus Miridae, Lygus pratensis, Lygus rugulipennis Lygaeidae, Myrmus miriformis Rhopalidae, etc.).
