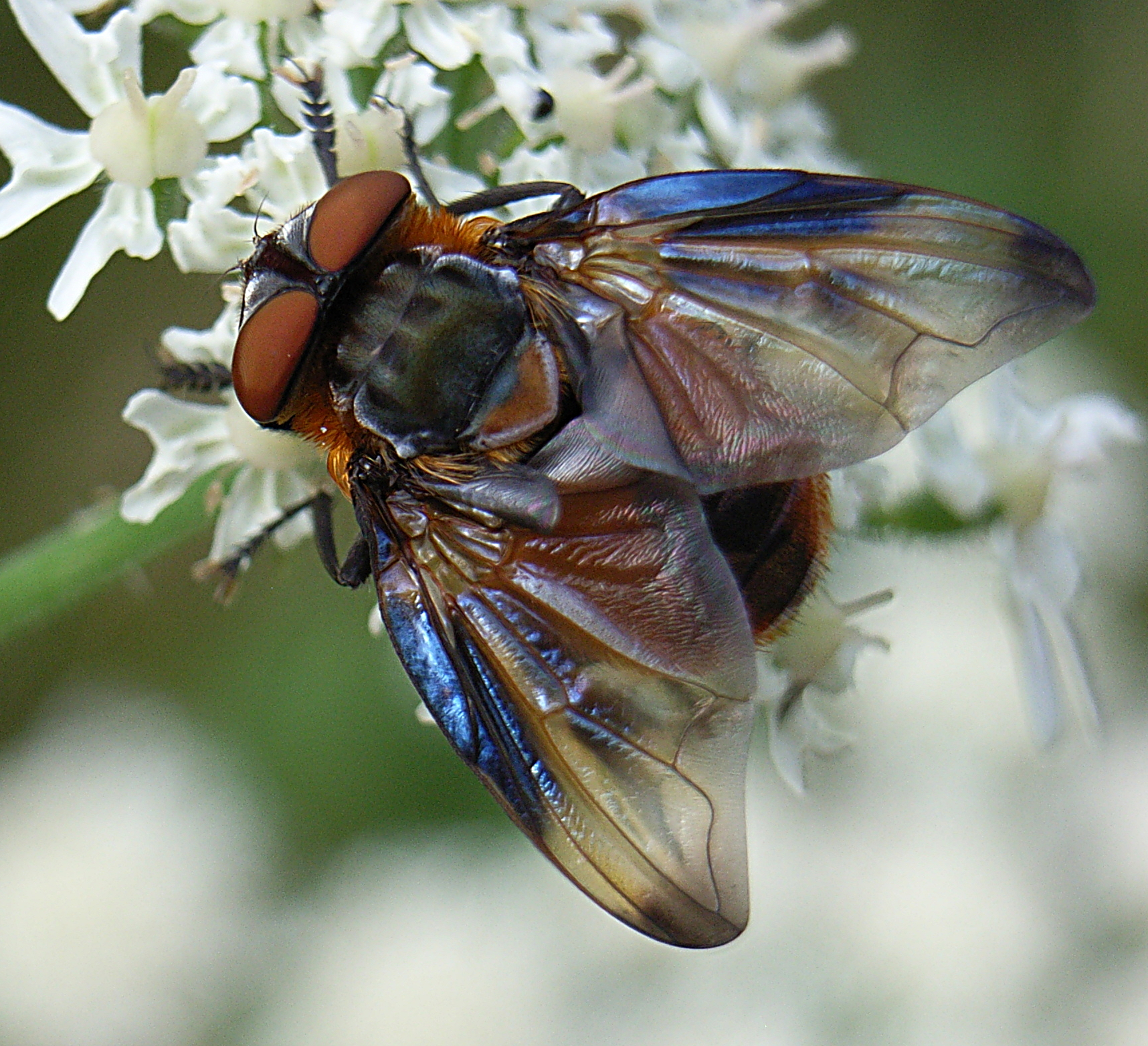
- Phasia hemiptera. Male

Scientific classification
- Kingdom: Animalia
- Phylum: Arthropoda
- Class: Insecta
- Order: Diptera
- Family: Tachinidae
- Genus: Phasia
- Species: P. hemiptera

Binomial name
- Phasia hemiptera (Fabricius, 1794)

Synonyms
- Musca tristis Herbst, 1787; Syrphus subcoleoptratus Fabricius, 1775 non Linnaeus, 1767; Alophora daimio Matsumura, 1916; Alophora hemiptera var. eximia Girschner, 1887; Alophora hemiptera var. obscura Girschner, 1887; Alophora hemiptera var. vittata Girschner, 1887; Alophora obscuripennis Meigen, 1838; Alophora orthoptera Rondani, 1861; Syrphus affinis Fabricius, 1794; Syrphus hemipterus Fabricius, 1794

= Phasia hemiptera =

Species of fly

Phasia hemiptera is a fly belonging to the family Tachinidae.

== Distribution ==
British Isles, Czech Republic, Estonia, Hungary, Latvia, Moldova, Poland, Romania, Slovakia, Ukraine, Denmark, Finland, Norway, Sweden, Bosnia and Herzegovina, Bulgaria, Croatia, Greece, Italy, Serbia, Slovenia, Spain, Turkey, Austria, Belgium, France, Germany, Netherlands, Switzerland, Japan, North Korea, South Korea, Iran, Russia, China, Transcaucasia.

== Description ==
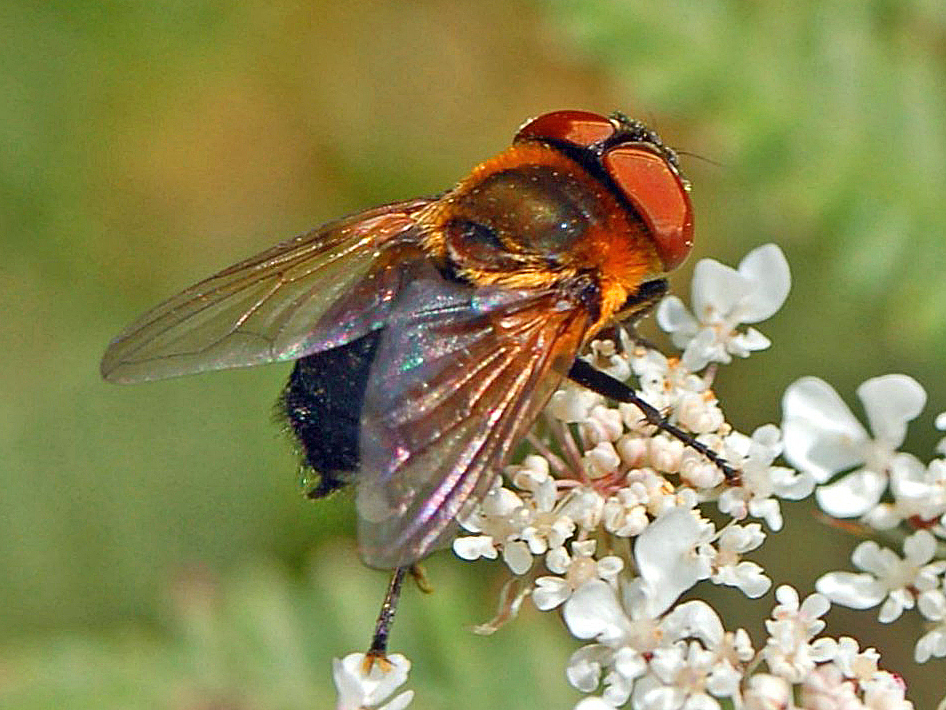
Female

Phasia hemiptera can reach a body length of 10–11 millimetres (0.39–0.43 in). In these flies the thorax is usually dark brown, the middle of the very flattened abdomen is dark brown or black, while the sides are hairy orange-brown. The hind legs are generally reddish yellow. These flies are strongly sexually dimorphic. The males are more colourful and have broad curved patterned wings with markings of various colors. Sometimes wings show an iridescent blue-black band starting from the front edge, but they may also be or completely dark. Females have narrower and more transparent wings without markings, also their bodies are narrower.

== Biology ==
Adults are visible from April to September feeding on pollen of many flowering plants, especially on umbellifers Apiaceae and Asteraceae. There are two generations per year, as this species is bivoltine. The first generation appears from mid-April to mid-June, the second from mid-July to the end of September. Like most tachinid flies, the female lays her eggs on other insects, the larvae then develop inside the living host, devouring it and eventually killing it (case of endoparasitism). Its main hosts are the forest bug Pentatoma rufipes in the spring, and the green shield bug Palomena prasina in the autumn. The pupation occurs after about two weeks. The adults hatch after two and a half to four weeks, with the males appearing earlier than the females. Males live for a maximum of 31 days, females only 21.

Female on flowers (Video, 1m 15s)

== Bibliography ==
- Erika Lutovinas et al.: "A Supplement to the Diptera Fauna of Lithuania" Acta Zoologica Lituanica, 2003, Vol. 13, Num. 4; ISSN 1648-6919
- H.-P. Tschorsnig & B. Hertnig: Die Raupenfliegen (Diptera: Tachinidae) Mitteleuropas: Bestimmungstabellen und Angaben zur Ökologie und Verbreitung der einzelnen Arten. Stuttgarter Beiträge zur Naturkunde, Serie A (Biologie) 506, 1994: 170 pp
- Michael Chinery, Insectes de France et d'Europe occidentale, Paris, Flammarion, 2012, 320 p. (ISBN 978-2-0812-8823-2), p. 212-213.
- T.O. Markova New Host and Distribution Data of Tachnid Flies of Subfamils Phasiinae in Siberia and Russian Far East Far Eastern Entomologist Number 75: 1–8 ISSN 1026-051X July 1999
