= Pimenta odiolens =

Conservation status
- Least Concern (IUCN 3.1)

Scientific classification
- Kingdom: Plantae
- Clade: Tracheophytes
- Clade: Angiosperms
- Clade: Eudicots
- Clade: Rosids
- Order: Myrtales
- Family: Myrtaceae
- Genus: Pimenta
- Species: P. odiolens

Binomial name
- Pimenta odiolens (Urb.) Burret

Synonyms
- Amomis odiolens Urb.; Krokia odiolens (Urb.) Borhidi & O.Muñiz; Myrtekmania clementis Alain; Myrtekmania odiolens (Urb.) Alain

Species of flowering plant

Pimenta odiolens, commonly known as palo de cincha, is a species of flowering plant in the family Myrtaceae. It is a shrub or tree endemic to eastern Cuba. It is threatened by habitat loss.
