= Pimenta jamaicensis =

Conservation status
- Near Threatened (IUCN 2.3)

Scientific classification
- Kingdom: Plantae
- Clade: Tracheophytes
- Clade: Angiosperms
- Clade: Eudicots
- Clade: Rosids
- Order: Myrtales
- Family: Myrtaceae
- Genus: Pimenta
- Species: P. jamaicensis

Binomial name
- Pimenta jamaicensis (Britton & Harris) Proctor

Species of flowering plant

Pimenta jamaicensis is a species of plant in the family Myrtaceae. It is endemic to Jamaica.
