= Pterocerina paradoxa =

Scientific classification
- Kingdom: Animalia
- Phylum: Arthropoda
- Class: Insecta
- Order: Diptera
- Family: Ulidiidae
- Genus: Pterocerina
- Species: P. paradoxa

Binomial name
- Pterocerina paradoxa Hering, 1941

Species of fly

Pterocerina paradoxa is a species of ulidiid or picture-winged fly in the genus Pterocerina of the family Ulidiidae.
