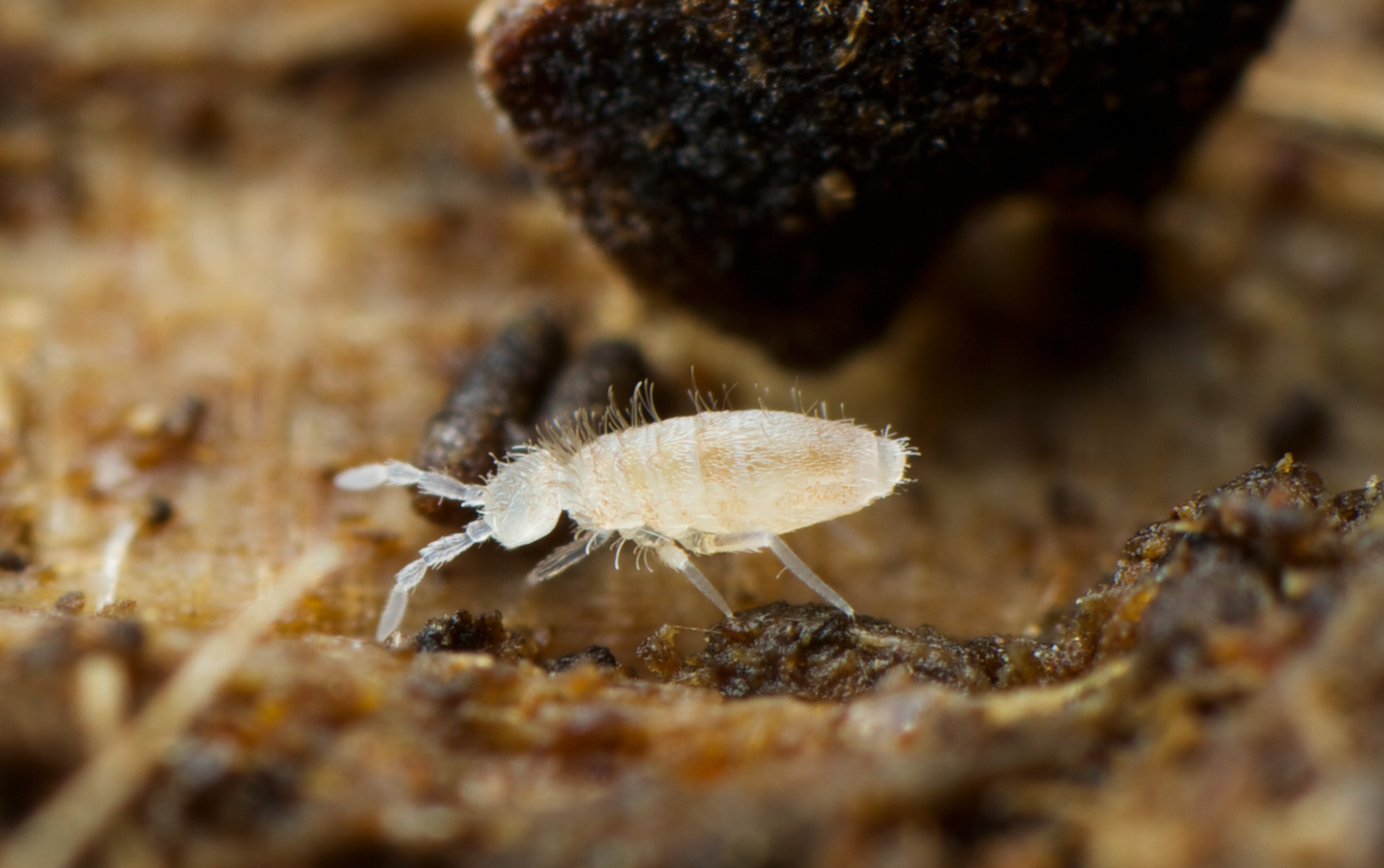

Scientific classification
- Kingdom: Animalia
- Phylum: Arthropoda
- Class: Collembola
- Order: Entomobryomorpha
- Family: Paronellidae
- Genus: Cyphoderus; Nicolet, 1842

= Cyphoderus =

Genus of springtails

Cyphoderus is a genus of elongate-bodied springtails in the family Paronellidae. There are more than 20 described species in Cyphoderus.

== Species ==
These 21 species belong to the genus Cyphoderus:

- Cyphoderus agnotus Boerner, 1906
- Cyphoderus albinus Nicolet, 1842
- Cyphoderus assimilis Börner, 1906
- Cyphoderus bidenticulatus Parona, 1888
- Cyphoderus caetetus
- Cyphoderus canariensis da Gama, 1988
- Cyphoderus gisini Gruia, 1967
- Cyphoderus inaequalis Pack
- Cyphoderus jugoslavicus Denis, 1933
- Cyphoderus khaochakanus Jantarit, Satasook & Deharveng, 2014
- Cyphoderus komareki Rusek, 1961
- Cyphoderus manuneru Bernard, Soto-Adames & Wynne, 2015
- Cyphoderus mucrominimus Oliveira, Alves & Zeppelini, 2017
- Cyphoderus mucrostrimenus Oliveira, Alves & Zeppelini, 2017
- Cyphoderus orientalis Folsom
- Cyphoderus paralbinus Jacquemart, 1980
- Cyphoderus pinnatus Folsom
- Cyphoderus similis Folsom, 1927
- Cyphoderus songkhlaensis Jantarit, Satasook & Deharveng, 2014
- Cyphoderus squamidives Silvestri, 1917
- Cyphoderus veneris Denis, 1923
