= Phasia subopaca =

Scientific classification
- Kingdom: Animalia
- Phylum: Arthropoda
- Class: Insecta
- Order: Diptera
- Family: Tachinidae
- Subfamily: Phasiinae
- Tribe: Phasiini
- Genus: Phasia
- Species: P. subopaca

Binomial name
- Phasia subopaca (Coquillett, 1897)

Synonyms
- Alophora subopaca Coquillett, 1897

Species of fly

Phasia subopaca is a species of bristle fly in the family Tachinidae.

== Distribution ==
Canada, United States.
