= Pterocerina plurifurcata =

Scientific classification
- Kingdom: Animalia
- Phylum: Arthropoda
- Clade: Pancrustacea
- Class: Insecta
- Order: Diptera
- Family: Ulidiidae
- Genus: Pterocerina
- Species: P. plurifurcata

Binomial name
- Pterocerina plurifurcata Blanchard, 1938

Species of fly

Pterocerina plurifurcata is a species of ulidiid or picture-winged fly in the genus Pterocerina of the family Ulidiidae.
