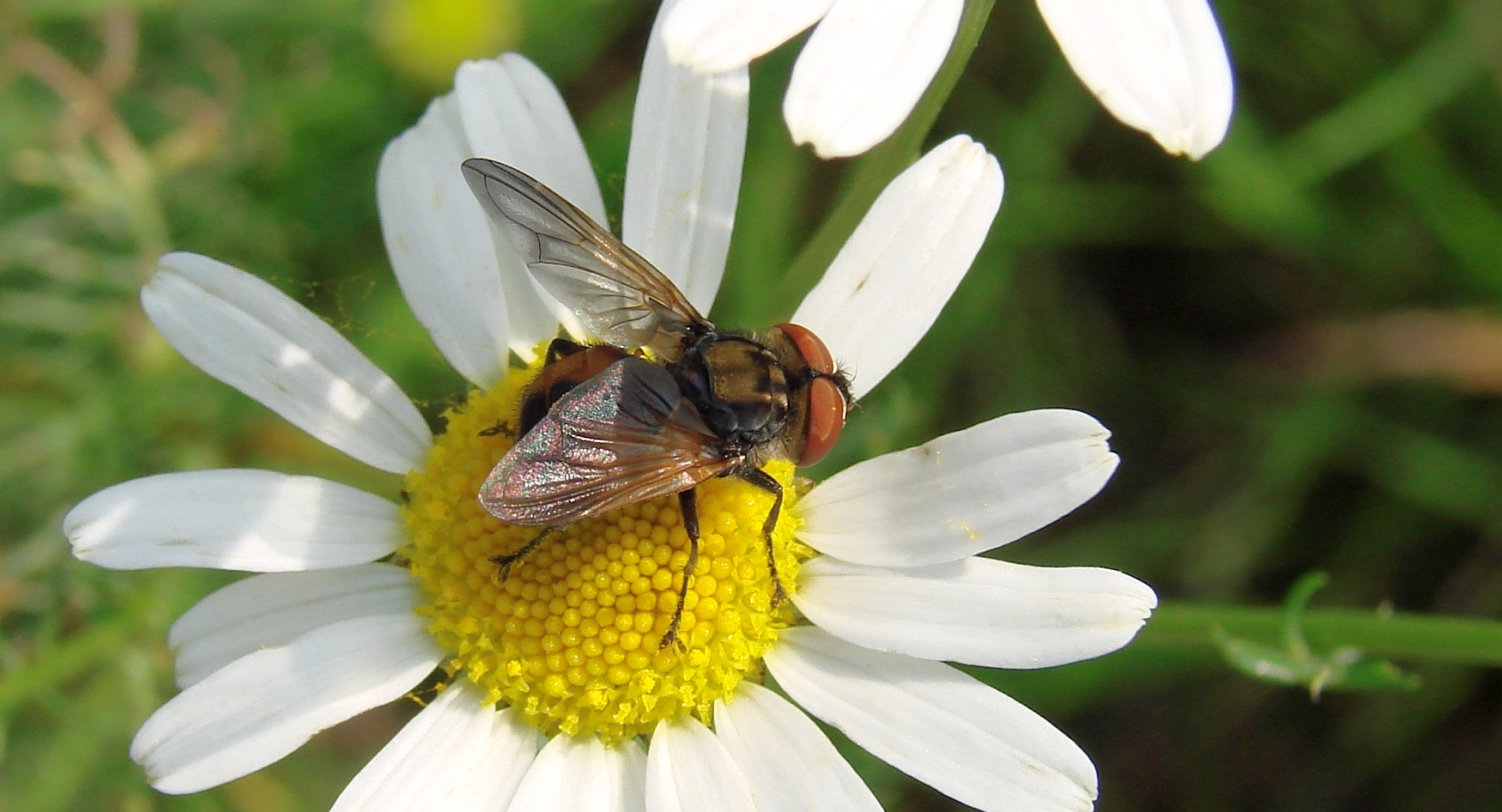

Scientific classification
- Kingdom: Animalia
- Phylum: Arthropoda
- Clade: Pancrustacea
- Class: Insecta
- Order: Diptera
- Family: Tachinidae
- Subfamily: Phasiinae
- Tribe: Phasiini
- Genus: Phasia
- Species: P. aurigera

Binomial name
- Phasia aurigera (Egger, 1860)

Synonyms
- Alophora aurigera Egger, 1860; Alophora kriechbaumeri Schiner, 1869; Hyalomya bonapartea Rondani, 1861; Hyalomya helleri Palm, 1876; Phasia urnifera Roser, 1840; Alophora splendida Coquillett, 1902; Phasiomyia meliceris Reinhard, 1955

= Phasia aurigera =

Species of fly

Phasia aurigera is a species of tachinid fly.

== Description ==
Body length 8-13mm.

== Distribution ==
Czech Republic, Hungary, Lithuania, Poland, Romania, Slovakia, Ukraine, Denmark, Bulgaria, Croatia, Greece, Italy, Portugal, Serbia, Spain, Turkey, Austria, France, Germany, Netherlands, Switzerland, North Korea, South Korea, Iran, Russia, China.

== Hosts ==
Hemiptera - Palomena prasina, Rhaphigaster nebulosa, Coreus marginatus, Gonocerus juniperi, Gonocerus acuteangulatus.
