= Pterocerina garleppi =

Scientific classification
- Kingdom: Animalia
- Phylum: Arthropoda
- Clade: Pancrustacea
- Class: Insecta
- Order: Diptera
- Family: Ulidiidae
- Genus: Pterocerina
- Species: P. garleppi

Binomial name
- Pterocerina garleppi Enderlein, 1921

Species of fly

Pterocerina garleppi is a species of ulidiid or picture-winged fly in the genus Pterocerina of the family Ulidiidae.
