= Uclesia varicornis =

Scientific classification
- Kingdom: Animalia
- Phylum: Arthropoda
- Class: Insecta
- Order: Diptera
- Family: Tachinidae
- Subfamily: Dexiinae
- Tribe: Voriini
- Genus: Uclesia
- Species: U. varicornis

Binomial name
- Uclesia varicornis Curran, 1927

Species of fly

Uclesia varicornis is a species of fly in the family Tachinidae.

== Distribution ==
United States.
