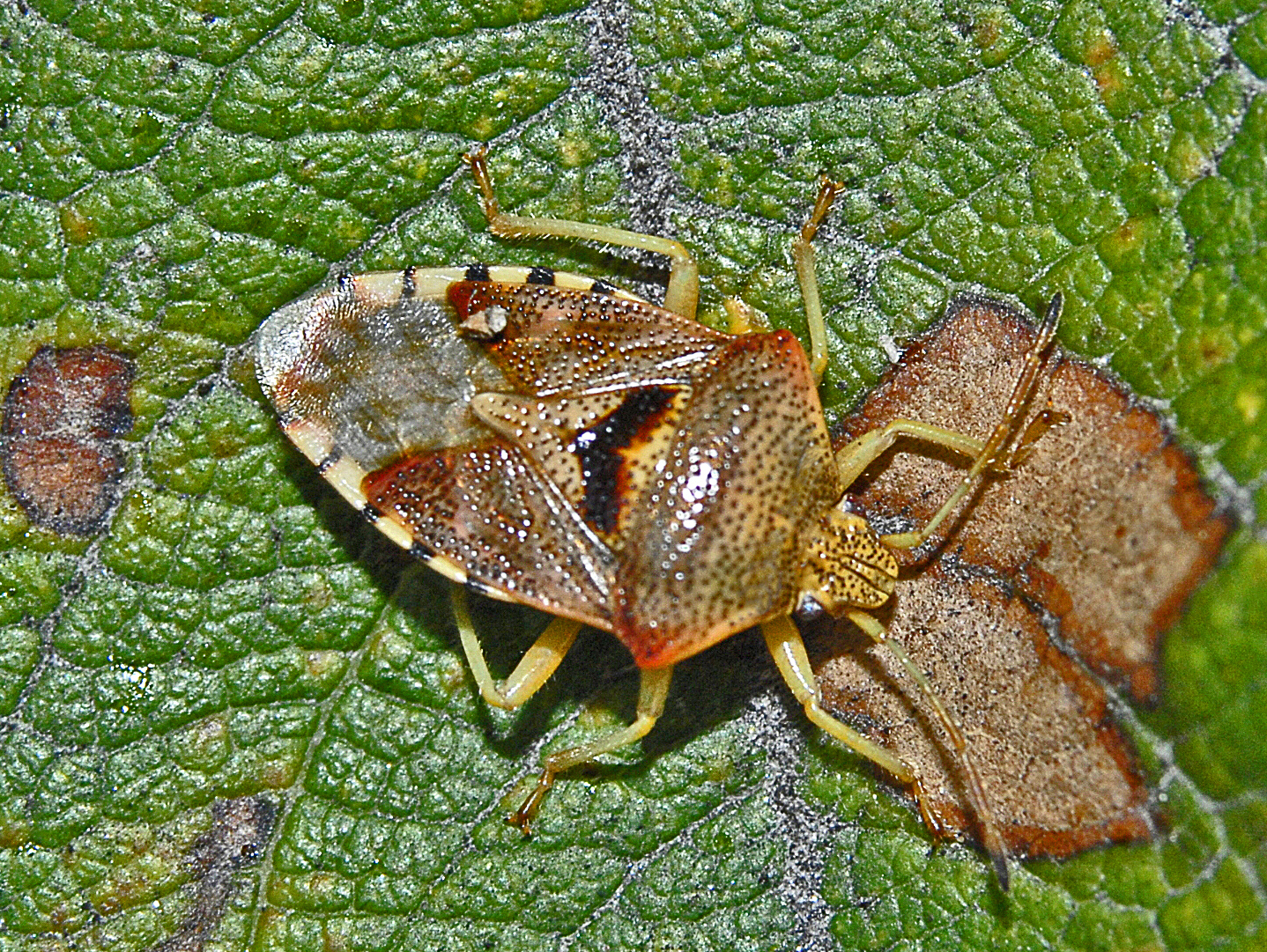
- Elasmucha grisea

Scientific classification
- Kingdom: Animalia
- Phylum: Arthropoda
- Clade: Pancrustacea
- Class: Insecta
- Order: Hemiptera
- Suborder: Heteroptera
- Family: Acanthosomatidae
- Subfamily: Acanthosomatinae
- Genus: Elasmucha; Stål, 1864

Synonyms
- Clinocoris Hahn, 1834; Galasastra Breddin, 1903; Meadorus Mulsant & Rey, 1866; Pseudostollia Breddin, 1901

= Elasmucha =

Genus of true bugs

Elasmucha is a genus of shield bugs belonging to the subfamily Acanthosomatinae. Species are found mostly in the Palaearctic, Oriental and Nearctic realms.

== Species ==
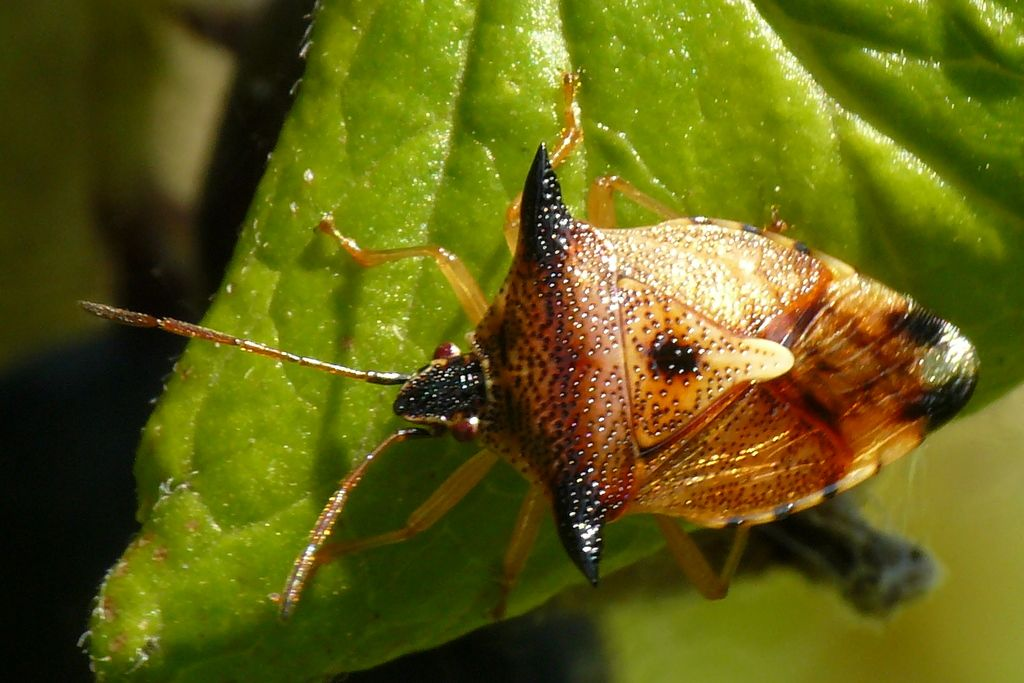
Elasmucha ferrugata

Biolib includes:

1. Elasmucha albicincta Distant, 1918
2. Elasmucha amurensis Kerzhner, 1972
3. Elasmucha angularis Hsiao & S.L. Liu, 1977
4. Elasmucha aspera (Walker, 1867)
5. Elasmucha brevis S.L. Liu, 1987
6. Elasmucha broussonetiae C.R. Li & Zheng, 2000
7. Elasmucha choui C.R. Li & Zheng, 2000
8. Elasmucha cordillera Thomas, 1991
9. Elasmucha decorata Hsiao & S.L. Liu, 1977
10. Elasmucha dorsalis (Jakovlev, 1876)
11. Elasmucha fasciator (Fabricius, 1803)
12. Elasmucha fengkainica Z.Y. Chen, 1989
13. Elasmucha ferrugata (Fabricius, 1787)
14. Elasmucha fieberi (Jakovlev, 1864)
15. Elasmucha flammatum (Distant, 1893)
16. Elasmucha fujianensis S.L. Liu, 1980
17. Elasmucha glabra Hsiao & S.L. Liu, 1977
18. Elasmucha grisea (Linnaeus, 1758)
19. Elasmucha guangxiensis S.L. Liu, 1980
20. Elasmucha hsiaoi S.L. Liu, 1989
21. Elasmucha laeviventris S.L. Liu, 1979
22. Elasmucha lateralis (Say, 1831)
23. Elasmucha lineata (Dallas, 1849)
24. Elasmucha minor Hsiao & S.L. Liu, 1977
25. Elasmucha necopinata Kirkaldy, 1909
26. Elasmucha nipponica (Esaki & Ishihara, 1950)
27. Elasmucha pilosa S.L. Liu, 1989
28. Elasmucha potanini Lindberg, 1939
29. Elasmucha punctata (Dallas, 1851)
30. Elasmucha putoni Scott, 1874
31. Elasmucha recurva (Dallas, 1851)
32. Elasmucha rubra S.L. Liu, 1987
33. Elasmucha rufescens (Jakovlev, 1890)
34. Elasmucha salebrosa (Breddin, 1903)
35. Elasmucha scutellata (Distant, 1887)
36. Elasmucha signoreti Scott, 1874
37. Elasmucha tauricornis Jensen-Haarup, 1931
38. Elasmucha truncatula (Walker, 1867)
39. Elasmucha xizangensis J.J. Li, 1981
40. Elasmucha yangi S.L. Liu, 1989
41. Elasmucha yunnana S.L. Liu, 1980
