= Phasia pusilla =

- Phasia pusilla (video)

Scientific classification
- Kingdom: Animalia
- Phylum: Arthropoda
- Clade: Pancrustacea
- Class: Insecta
- Order: Diptera
- Family: Tachinidae
- Subfamily: Phasiinae
- Tribe: Phasiini
- Genus: Phasia
- Species: P. pusilla

Binomial name
- Phasia pusilla Meigen, 1824

Synonyms
- Hyalomya carbonaria Robineau-Desvoidy, 1830; Hyalomya chorea Robineau-Desvoidy, 1863; Hyalomya corinna Robineau-Desvoidy, 1830; Phasia semicinerea Meigen, 1824; Phasia vitripennis Zetterstedt, 1859

Species of fly

Phasia pusilla is a European species of fly in the family Tachinidae.

== Hosts ==
Its larval hosts include species in the families Lygaeidae, Cydnidae, and Anthocoridae.

== Distribution ==
British Isles, Belarus, Czech Republic, Hungary, Latvia, Moldova, Poland, Romania, Slovakia, Ukraine, Denmark, Finland, Norway, Sweden, Albania, Bulgaria, Corsica, Croatia, Greece, Italy, Portugal, Serbia, Slovenia, Spain, Turkey, Austria, Belgium, Channel Islands, France, Germany, Netherlands, Switzerland, Japan, Kazakhstan, Iran, Israel, Palestine, Mongolia, Canary Islands, Egypt, Morocco, Russia, Transcaucasia, Pakistan, Kyrgyzstan, China.
