= Salina celebensis =

Scientific classification
- Domain: Eukaryota
- Kingdom: Animalia
- Phylum: Arthropoda
- Class: Collembola
- Order: Entomobryomorpha
- Family: Paronellidae
- Genus: Salina
- Species: S. celebensis

Binomial name
- Salina celebensis (C.Schäffer, 1898)

Synonyms
- Cremastocephalus celebensis C.Schäffer, 1898

Species of arthropod

Salina celebensis is a species of elongate-bodied springtail within the family Paronellidae. Its distribution is in the mountains of China, although it has been introduced in the Hawaiian Islands.
