= Pterocerina costalimai =

Scientific classification
- Kingdom: Animalia
- Phylum: Arthropoda
- Clade: Pancrustacea
- Class: Insecta
- Order: Diptera
- Family: Ulidiidae
- Genus: Pterocerina
- Species: P. costalimai

Binomial name
- Pterocerina costalimai Capoor, 1954

Species of fly

Pterocerina costalimai is a species of ulidiid or picture-winged fly in the genus Pterocerina of the family Ulidiidae.
