= Pimenta podocarpoides =

Conservation status
- Critically Endangered (IUCN 3.1)

Scientific classification
- Kingdom: Plantae
- Clade: Tracheophytes
- Clade: Angiosperms
- Clade: Eudicots
- Clade: Rosids
- Order: Myrtales
- Family: Myrtaceae
- Genus: Pimenta
- Species: P. podocarpoides

Binomial name
- Pimenta podocarpoides (Areces) Landrum

Synonyms
- Krokia podocarpoides (Areces) Borhidi & O.Muñiz; Myrtekmania podocarpoides Areces

Species of flowering plant

Pimenta podocarpoides is a species of flowering plant in the family Myrtaceae. It is a shrub or tree endemic to eastern Cuba. It is threatened by habitat loss.
