= Pimenta adenoclada =

Conservation status
- Endangered (IUCN 3.1)

Scientific classification
- Kingdom: Plantae
- Clade: Tracheophytes
- Clade: Angiosperms
- Clade: Eudicots
- Clade: Rosids
- Order: Myrtales
- Family: Myrtaceae
- Genus: Pimenta
- Species: P. adenoclada

Binomial name
- Pimenta adenoclada (Urb.) Burret

Synonyms
- Eugenia adenoclada Urb.; Krokia adenoclada (Urb.) Borhidi & O.Muñiz; Myrtekmania adenoclada (Urb.) Urb.

Species of flowering plant

Pimenta adenoclada is a species of flowering plant in the family Myrtaceae (Myrtle). It a shrub or tree is endemic to Cuba. It is threatened by habitat loss.
