= Pimenta filipes =

Conservation status
- Endangered (IUCN 3.1)

Scientific classification
- Kingdom: Plantae
- Clade: Tracheophytes
- Clade: Angiosperms
- Clade: Eudicots
- Clade: Rosids
- Order: Myrtales
- Family: Myrtaceae
- Genus: Pimenta
- Species: P. filipes

Binomial name
- Pimenta filipes (Urb.) Burret

Synonyms
- Krokia filipes (Urb.) Borhidi & O.Muñiz; Krokia leonis Borhidi & O.Muñiz; Krokia moaensis (Areces) Borhidi & O.Muñiz; Myrtekmania filipes Urb.; Myrtekmania moaensis Areces; Pimenta moaensis Borhidi & O.Muñiz; Pimenta moaensis (Areces) Urquiola, nom. illeg. homonym. post.; Pimenta urquiolae Bisse

Species of flowering plant

Pimenta filipes, commonly known as limonicillo, is a species of flowering plant in the family Myrtaceae. It is a shrub or tree endemic to east-central and northeastern Cuba.
