= Phasia aldrichii =

Scientific classification
- Kingdom: Animalia
- Phylum: Arthropoda
- Class: Insecta
- Order: Diptera
- Family: Tachinidae
- Subfamily: Phasiinae
- Tribe: Phasiini
- Genus: Phasia
- Species: P. aldrichii

Binomial name
- Phasia aldrichii (Townsend, 1891)

Synonyms
- Hyalomyia aldrichii Townsend, 1891; Hyalomyia celer Townsend, 1895; Phorantha pruinosa Robertson, 1901; Phasia cara West, 1925; Hyalomya aldrichii Sabrosky and Arnaud, 1965; Alophora karczewskii Draber-Mońko, 1965; Hyalomya aldrichi Guimarães, 1971; Hyalomya aldrichii Arnaud, 1978; Phasia karczewskii Herting, 1984

Species of fly

Phasia aldrichii is a tachinid fly found throughout most of North America.

== Distribution ==
Canada, United States, Mexico. Hungary, Germany, Kazakhstan, Mongolia, Russia.

== Description ==
Body length 3-5mm.
