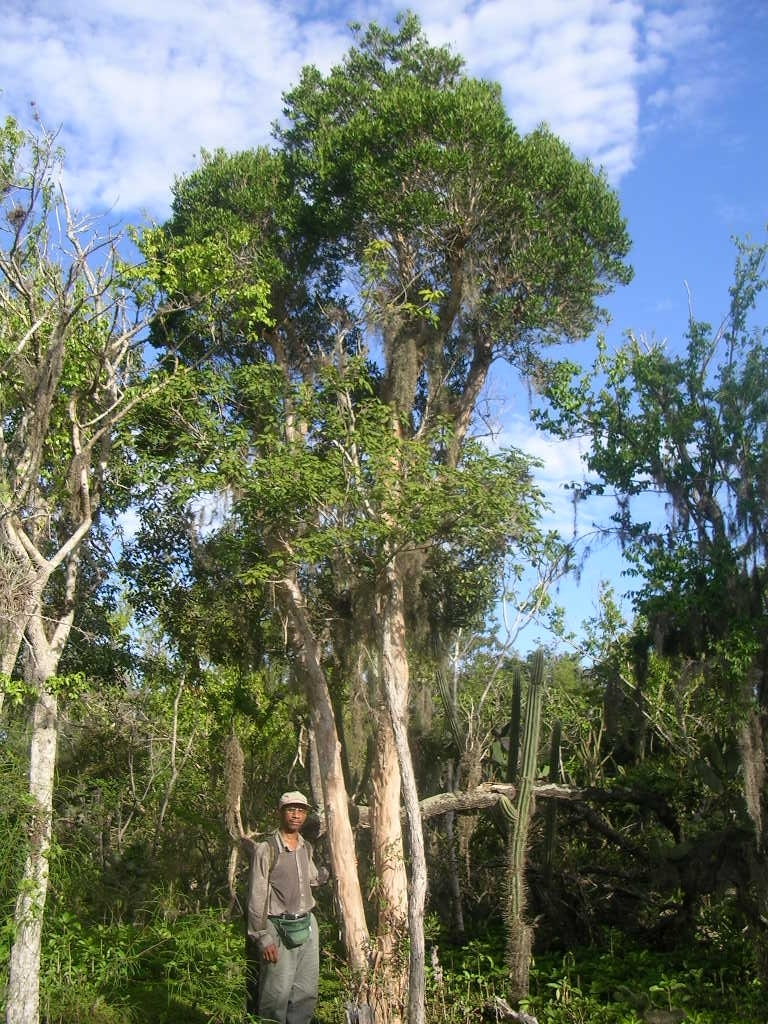
- Canelilla de Jaragua (Pimenta haitiensis) tree in Jaragua National Park, Dominican Republic

Conservation status
- Vulnerable (IUCN 2.3)

Scientific classification
- Kingdom: Plantae
- Clade: Tracheophytes
- Clade: Angiosperms
- Clade: Eudicots
- Clade: Rosids
- Order: Myrtales
- Family: Myrtaceae
- Genus: Pimenta
- Species: P. haitiensis

Binomial name
- Pimenta haitiensis (Urb.) Landrum

Synonyms
- Cryptorhiza haitiensis Urb.

= Pimenta haitiensis =

Species of plant

Pimenta haitiensis is a species of flowering plant in the family Myrtaceae. It is a tree endemic to southern Hispaniola (the Dominican Republic and Haiti),
