= Pimenta cainitoides =

Conservation status
- Vulnerable (IUCN 2.3)

Scientific classification
- Kingdom: Plantae
- Clade: Tracheophytes
- Clade: Angiosperms
- Clade: Eudicots
- Clade: Rosids
- Order: Myrtales
- Family: Myrtaceae
- Genus: Pimenta
- Species: P. cainitoides

Binomial name
- Pimenta cainitoides (Urb.) Burret

Synonyms
- Amomis pilotoana Urb.; Krokia cainitoides (Urb.) Urb.; Krokia nipensis Urb.; Krokia pilotoana (Urb.) Borhidi; Myrtus cainitoides Urb.; Pimenta nipensis (Urb.) Burret; Pimenta pilotoana (Urb.) Borhidi

Species of flowering plant

Pimenta cainitoides is a species of plant in the family Myrtaceae. It is endemic to Cuba. It is threatened by habitat loss.
