= Phasia albipennis =

Scientific classification
- Kingdom: Animalia
- Phylum: Arthropoda
- Class: Insecta
- Order: Diptera
- Family: Tachinidae
- Subfamily: Phasiinae
- Tribe: Phasiini
- Genus: Phasia
- Species: P. albipennis

Binomial name
- Phasia albipennis (Brooks, 1945)

Synonyms
- Paraphasia albipennis Brooks, 1945

Species of fly

Phasia albipennis is a species of bristle fly in the family Tachinidae.

== Distribution ==
Canada, United States.
