= Pterocerina bifasciata =

Scientific classification
- Domain: Eukaryota
- Kingdom: Animalia
- Phylum: Arthropoda
- Class: Insecta
- Order: Diptera
- Family: Ulidiidae
- Genus: Pterocerina
- Species: P. bifasciata

Binomial name
- Pterocerina bifasciata Hendel, 1909

Species of fly

Pterocerina bifasciata is a species of ulidiid or picture-winged fly in the genus Pterocerina of the family Ulidiidae.
