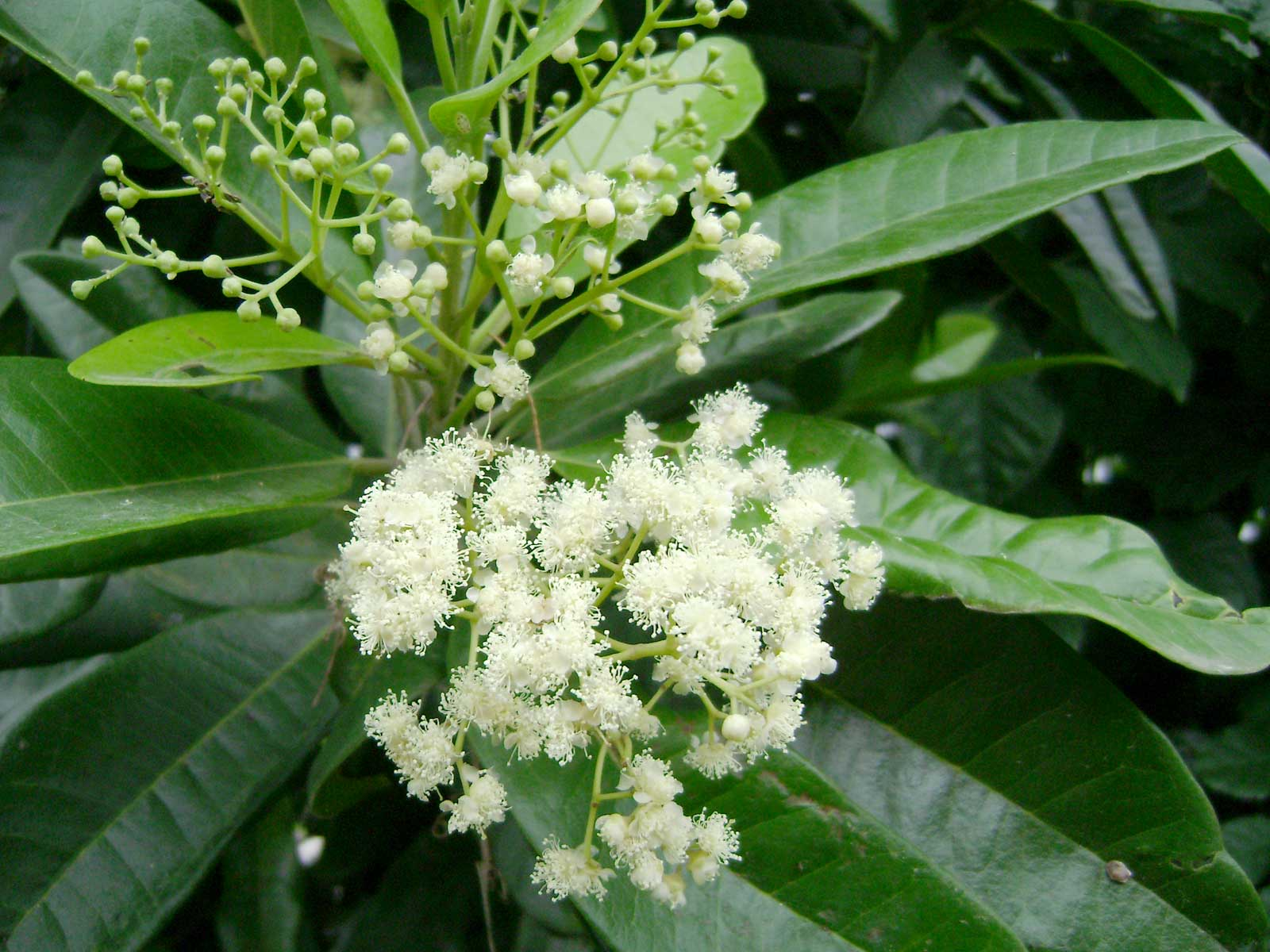
- Pimenta dioica flowers

Scientific classification
- Kingdom: Plantae
- Clade: Embryophytes
- Clade: Tracheophytes
- Clade: Spermatophytes
- Clade: Angiosperms
- Clade: Eudicots
- Clade: Rosids
- Order: Myrtales
- Family: Myrtaceae
- Subfamily: Myrtoideae
- Tribe: Myrteae
- Genus: Pimenta; Lindl.

Synonyms
- Amomis O.Berg; Cryptorhiza Urb.; Evanesca Raf.; Krokia Urb.; Mentodendron Lundell; Myrtekmania Urb.; Pimentus Raf.; Pseudocaryophyllus O.Berg

= Pimenta (genus) =

Genus of flowering plants in the myrtle family

Pimenta is a genus of flowering plants in the myrtle family, Myrtaceae described as a genus in 1821. It is native to Central and South America, Mexico, and the West Indies.

Well-known species include allspice (P. dioica) and the West Indian bay tree (P. racemosa). The name is mostly probably derived from the Portuguese word pimenta, with the same meaning of the Spanish word pimienta, meaning "peppercorn". It refers to the berries of P. dioica.

== Species ==
20 species are accepted.

- Pimenta adenoclada (Urb.) Alain – Cuba
- Pimenta berciliae T.N.C.Vasconc. & Peguero – Dominican Republic
- Pimenta cainitoides (Urb.) Burret – Cuba and Dominican Republic
- Pimenta dioica (L.) Merr. – allspice – Southern Mexico, Central America, Greater Antilles, Cayman Islands, and Bahamas
- Pimenta ferruginea (Griseb.) Burret – Cuba
- Pimenta filipes (Urb.) Burret – Cuba
- Pimenta guatemalensis (Lundell) Lundell – Guatemala, Costa Rica, and Panama
- Pimenta haitiensis (Urb.) Landrum – Haiti and Dominican Republic
- Pimenta intermedia (Bisse) Urquiola – Cuba
- Pimenta jamaicensis (Britton & Harris) Proctor – Jamaica
- Pimenta obscura Proctor – Jamaica
- Pimenta odiolens (Urb.) Burret – Cuba
- Pimenta oligantha (Urb.) Burret – Cuba
- Pimenta paganii (Krug & Urb.) Flickinger – Puerto Rico
- Pimenta podocarpoides (Areces) Landrum – Cuba
- Pimenta pseudocaryophyllus (Gomes) Landrum – Brazil and Bolivia
- Pimenta racemosa (Mill.) J.W.Moore – West Indian bay tree – Cayman Islands, Cuba, Hispaniola, Puerto Rico, Lesser Antilles, Trinidad, and Venezuela
- Pimenta richardii Proctor – Jamaica
- Pimenta samanensis (Alain) Peguero – Dominican Republic (formerly assigned to Eugenia)
- Pimenta yumana (Alain) T.N.C.Vasconc. – Dominican Republic (formerly assigned to Eugenia)
