= Pimenta richardii =

Conservation status
- Endangered (IUCN 2.3)

Scientific classification
- Kingdom: Plantae
- Clade: Tracheophytes
- Clade: Angiosperms
- Clade: Eudicots
- Clade: Rosids
- Order: Myrtales
- Family: Myrtaceae
- Genus: Pimenta
- Species: P. richardii

Binomial name
- Pimenta richardii Proctor

Species of flowering plant

Pimenta richardii is a species of plant in the family Myrtaceae. It is endemic to Jamaica.
