= Pimenta oligantha =

Conservation status
- Endangered (IUCN 3.1)

Scientific classification
- Kingdom: Plantae
- Clade: Tracheophytes
- Clade: Angiosperms
- Clade: Eudicots
- Clade: Rosids
- Order: Myrtales
- Family: Myrtaceae
- Genus: Pimenta
- Species: P. oligantha

Binomial name
- Pimenta oligantha (Urb.) Burret

Synonyms
- Krokia oligantha (Urb.) Borhidi & O.Muñiz; Mozartia emarginata Moldenke; Myrcia emarginata (Moldenke) Alain; Myrtus oligantha Urb.; Pimenta cubensis Urb.; Pimenta myrciifolia Borhidi & O.Muñiz

Species of flowering plant

Pimenta oligantha is a species of flowering plant in the family Myrtaceae. It is a shrub or tree endemic to eastern Cuba.
