= Pterocerina scalaris =

Scientific classification
- Domain: Eukaryota
- Kingdom: Animalia
- Phylum: Arthropoda
- Class: Insecta
- Order: Diptera
- Family: Ulidiidae
- Genus: Pterocerina
- Species: P. scalaris

Binomial name
- Pterocerina scalaris Blanchard, 1938

Species of fly

Pterocerina scalaris is a species of ulidiid or picture-winged fly in the genus Pterocerina of the family Ulidiidae.
