= Pterocerina =

Scientific classification
- Domain: Eukaryota
- Kingdom: Animalia
- Phylum: Arthropoda
- Class: Insecta
- Order: Diptera
- Family: Ulidiidae
- Subfamily: Ulidiinae
- Tribe: Pterocallini
- Genus: Pterocerina; Hendel, 1909

Genus of flies

Pterocerina is a genus of picture-winged flies in the family Ulidiidae.

== Species ==
- Pterocerina acutipennis
- Pterocerina alboguttata
- Pterocerina americana
- Pterocerina anastrepha
- Pterocerina angulata
- Pterocerina basalis
- Pterocerina bifasciata
- Pterocerina clarifascia
- Pterocerina colorata
- Pterocerina costalimai
- Pterocerina fenestrata
- Pterocerina ferruginea
- Pterocerina furcata
- Pterocerina garleppi
- Pterocerina hendeli
- Pterocerina interrupta
- Pterocerina nigricauda
- Pterocerina nigripennis
- Pterocerina nigripes
- Pterocerina obliteratella
- Pterocerina ochracea
- Pterocerina pallidibasis
- Pterocerina paradoxa
- Pterocerina picea
- Pterocerina plurifurcata
- Pterocerina psidii
- Pterocerina ruficauda
- Pterocerina scalaris
- Pterocerina stylata
- Pterocerina townsendi
- Pterocerina trifasciata
