= Pimenta paganii =

Conservation status
- Critically Endangered (IUCN 2.3)

Scientific classification
- Kingdom: Plantae
- Clade: Tracheophytes
- Clade: Angiosperms
- Clade: Eudicots
- Clade: Rosids
- Order: Myrtales
- Family: Myrtaceae
- Genus: Pimenta
- Species: P. paganii

Binomial name
- Pimenta paganii (Krug & Urb.) Flickinger

Synonyms
- Myrcia paganii Krug & Urb.

Species of plant

Pimenta paganii is a species of plant in the family Myrtaceae. It is endemic to Puerto Rico.

Pimenta paganii is listed as endangered by the United States and Puerto Rico. It is classified as a perennial tree or shrub. There is a US Fish and Wildlife recovery plan in process.
