= Pimenta ferruginea =

Conservation status
- Critically Endangered (IUCN 3.1)

Scientific classification
- Kingdom: Plantae
- Clade: Tracheophytes
- Clade: Angiosperms
- Clade: Eudicots
- Clade: Rosids
- Order: Myrtales
- Family: Myrtaceae
- Genus: Pimenta
- Species: P. ferruginea

Binomial name
- Pimenta ferruginea (Griseb.) Burret

Synonyms
- Anamomis ferruginea Griseb.; Eugenia leriocarpa (C.Wright) Krug & Urb.; Krokia ferruginea (Griseb.) Urb.; Myrtus leriocarpa C.Wright

Species of flowering plant

Pimenta ferruginea is a species of flowering plant in the family Myrtaceae. It is a shrub or tree endemic to northwestern Cuba.
