= Chaetotaxy =

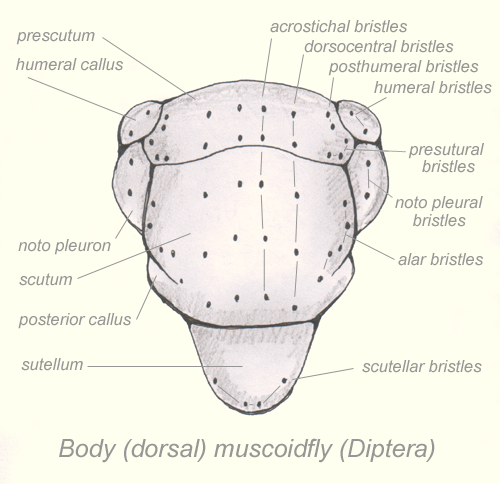
The chaetotaxy of the thorax of a muscoid fly

Chaetotaxy is the arrangement of bristles (macrochaetae) on an arthropod or annelid, or taxonomy based on their position and size. For example, it is important in Diptera, in which group it was formalised by Ernst August Girschner. The term chaetotaxy was later proposed by Carl Robert Osten-Sacken.

Morphology and chaetotaxy of the head of a fly (Muscomorpha)

The chaetotaxy of a fly might include :- acrostichal, dorsocentral, humeral, mesopleural, sternopleural, notopleural, postalar, supra-alar and scutellar bristles on the thorax; dorsal, posterodorsal, anterodorsal, ventral, posteroventral and anteroventral bristles on the legs and ocellar, orbital, postvertical, vibrissal, outer vertical and inner vertical bristles on the head.

Chaetotaxy is also used in determining homology in certain morphological traits, as well as providing information about the phylogeny between taxa. For example, chaetotaxy has been used to clarify evolutionary relationships in Collembola, as well as identify new species.

== See also ==
Morphology of Diptera
