= Pterocalla fenestrata =

Scientific classification
- Domain: Eukaryota
- Kingdom: Animalia
- Phylum: Arthropoda
- Class: Insecta
- Order: Diptera
- Family: Ulidiidae
- Genus: Pterocalla
- Species: P. fenestrata

Binomial name
- Pterocalla fenestrata Wulp, 1899

Species of insect

Pterocalla fenestrata is a species of ulidiid or picture-winged fly in the genus Pterocalla of the family Tephritidae.
