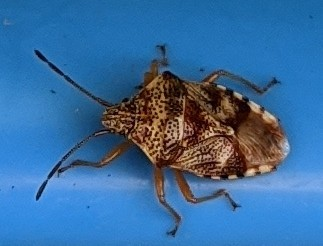

Scientific classification
- Domain: Eukaryota
- Kingdom: Animalia
- Phylum: Arthropoda
- Class: Insecta
- Order: Hemiptera
- Suborder: Heteroptera
- Family: Acanthosomatidae
- Genus: Elasmucha
- Species: E. lateralis

Binomial name
- Elasmucha lateralis (Say, 1831)

= Elasmucha lateralis =

Species of true bug

Elasmucha lateralis is a species of shield bug in the family Acanthosomatidae. It is found in North America.
