= Pleomeliola =

Scientific classification
- Kingdom: Fungi
- Division: Ascomycota
- Class: Sordariomycetes
- Order: Meliolales
- Family: Meliolaceae
- Genus: Pleomeliola (Sacc.) Sacc.

Type species
- Pleomeliola fenestrata (Cooke & Ellis) Sacc.

Genus of fungi

Pleomeliola is a genus of fungi within the Meliolaceae family.
