= Salina (springtail) =

Scientific classification
- Domain: Eukaryota
- Kingdom: Animalia
- Phylum: Arthropoda
- Class: Collembola
- Order: Entomobryomorpha
- Family: Paronellidae
- Genus: Salina; Macgillivray, 1894

Synonyms
- Cremastocephalus Schott, 1896

Genus of springtails

Salina is a genus of elongate-bodied springtails in the family Paronellidae. There are about five described species in Salina.

== Species ==
- Salina banksi Macgillivray, 1894
- Salina beta Christiansen & Bellinger, 1980
- Salina celebensis (Schaeffer, 1898)
- Salina mulcahyae Christiansen & Bellinger, 1980
- Salina trilobata Mills, 1932
