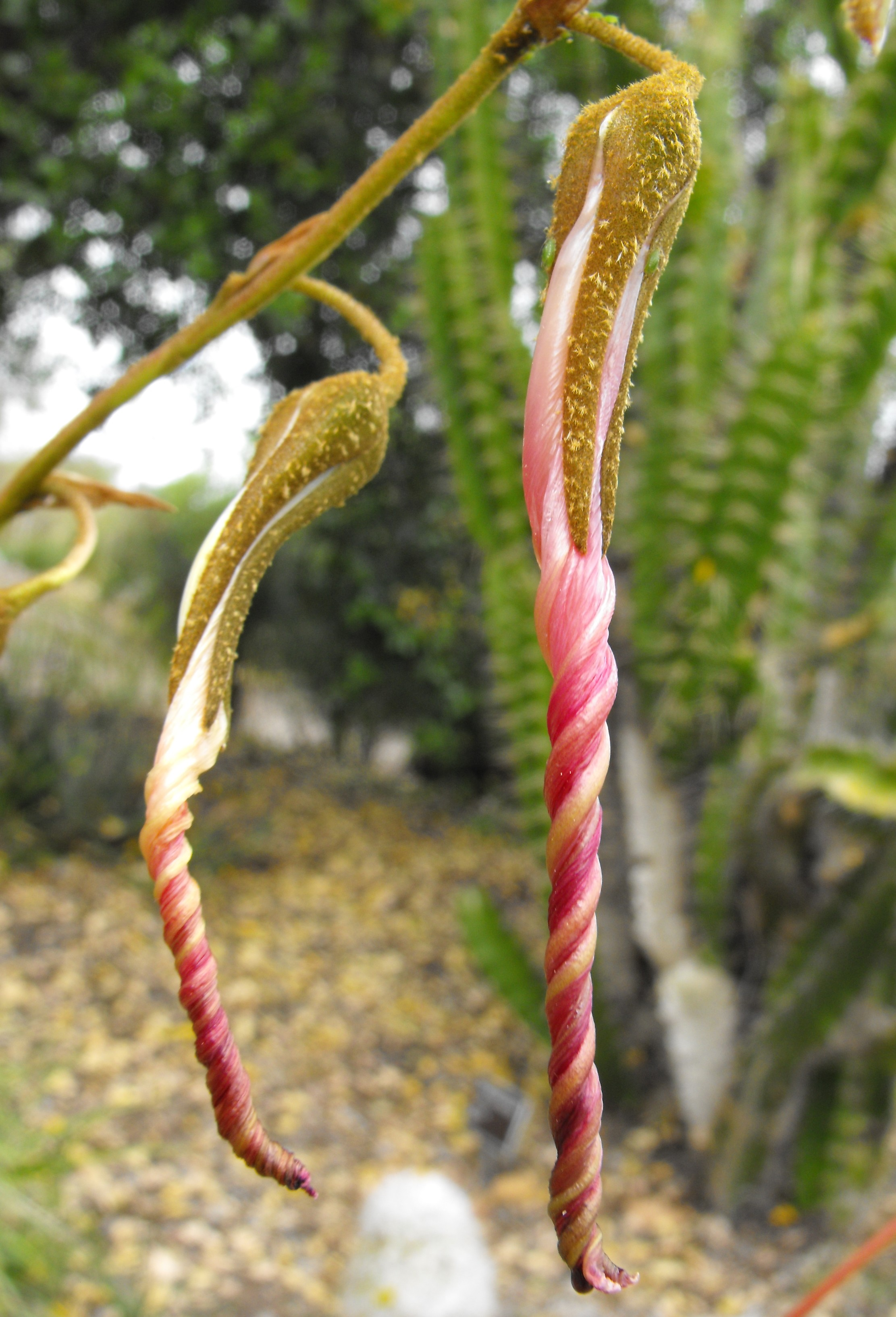

Scientific classification
- Kingdom: Plantae
- Clade: Tracheophytes
- Clade: Angiosperms
- Clade: Monocots
- Clade: Commelinids
- Order: Poales
- Family: Bromeliaceae
- Genus: Puya
- Subgenus: Puya subg. Puyopsis
- Species: P. ferruginea

Binomial name
- Puya ferruginea (Ruiz & Pav.) L.B.Sm.

Synonyms
- Hepetis ferruginea (Ruiz & Pav.) Mez; Pitcairnia ferruginea Ruiz & Pav.; Pourretia ferruginea (Ruiz & Pav.) Spreng.; Hepetis consimilis (Baker) Mez; Pitcairnia asterotricha Poepp. & Endl.; Pitcairnia consimilis Baker; Pitcairnia cotahuasiana Harms; Pitcairnia echinotricha (André) Baker; Pitcairnia herrerae Harms; Pitcairnia imperialis Harms; Pitcairnia laresiana Harms; Pitcairnia latibracteata Harms; Pitcairnia viridis Mez; Puya echinotricha André; Puya grandiflora Hook.

= Puya ferruginea =

Species of flowering plant

Puya ferruginea is a species of flowering plant in the family Bromeliaceae. This species is native to Bolivia and Ecuador.
