= Phasia fenestrata =

Scientific classification
- Kingdom: Animalia
- Phylum: Arthropoda
- Class: Insecta
- Order: Diptera
- Family: Tachinidae
- Subfamily: Phasiinae
- Tribe: Phasiini
- Genus: Phasia
- Species: P. fenestrata

Binomial name
- Phasia fenestrata (Bigot, 1889)

Synonyms
- Alophora fenestrata Bigot, 1889; Alophora magnapennis Johnson, 1904; Phasia phasiatrata Smith, 1915; Phorantha bridwelli Hine, 1902

Species of fly

Phasia fenestrata is a species of bristle fly in the family Tachinidae.

== Distribution ==
Canada, United States.
