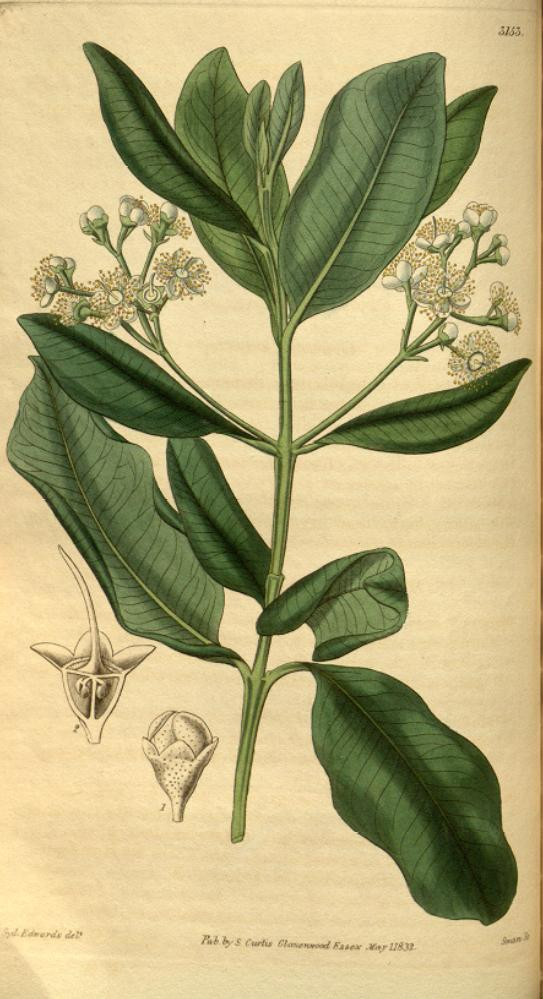

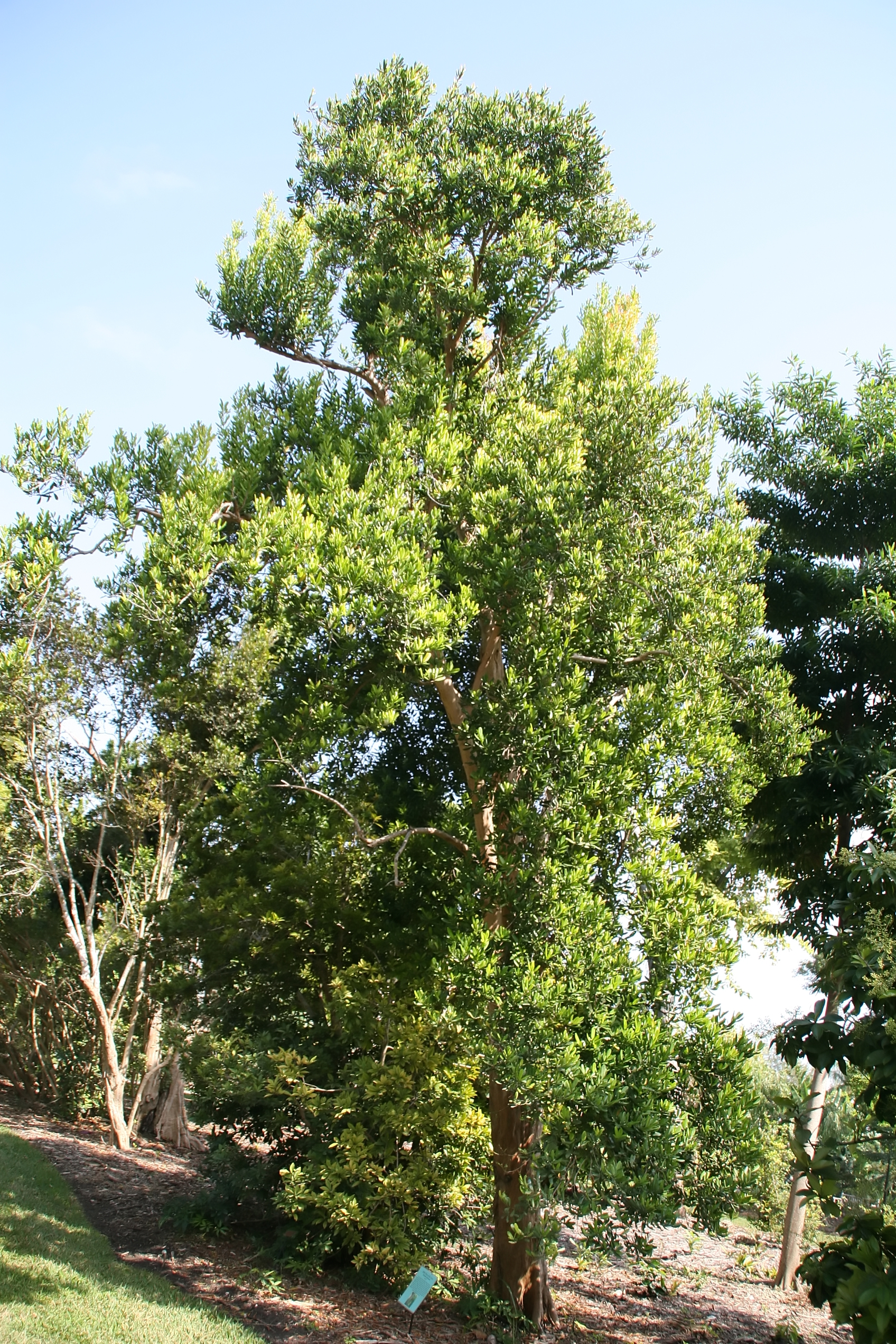

Conservation status
- Least Concern (IUCN 3.1)

Scientific classification
- Kingdom: Plantae
- Clade: Tracheophytes
- Clade: Angiosperms
- Clade: Eudicots
- Clade: Rosids
- Order: Myrtales
- Family: Myrtaceae
- Genus: Pimenta
- Species: P. racemosa

Binomial name
- Pimenta racemosa (Mill.) J.W.Moore

Varieties
- Pimenta racemosa var. grisea (Kiaersk.) Fosberg; Pimenta racemosa var. hispaniolensis (Urb.) Landrum; Pimenta racemosa var. ozua (Urb. & Ekman) Landrum; Pimenta racemosa var. racemosa; Pimenta racemosa var. terebinthina (Burret) Landrum

Synonyms
- Synonymy: Caryophyllus racemosus Mill. synonyms of var. grisea: Amomis caryophyllata var. grisea (Kiaersk.) Kiaersk.; Amomis grisea (Kiaersk.) Britton; Pimenta acris var. grisea Kiaersk. synonyms of var. hispaniolensis: Amomis hispaniolensis Urb.; Amomis pauciflora Urb.; Pimenta crenulata Alain; Pimenta hispaniolensis (Urb.) Burret; Pimenta pauciflora (Urb.) Burret synonyms of var. ozua: Amomis anisomera Urb. & Ekman; Amomis ozua Urb. & Ekman; Pimenta anisomera (Urb. & Ekman) Burret; Pimenta ozua (Urb. & Ekman) Burret synonyms of var. racemosa: Amomis acris (Sw.) O.Berg; Amomis acris var. grandifolia O.Berg; Amomis acris var. obtusata O.Berg; Amomis acris var. parvifolia O.Berg; Amomis caryophyllata Krug & Urb.; Amomis oblongata O.Berg; Amomis oblongata var. occidentalis O.Berg; Amomis pimento O.Berg; Amomis pimento var. jamaicensis O.Berg; Amomis pimento var. surinamensis O.Berg; Amomis pimentoides O.Berg; Eugenia tabasco (Willd. ex Schltdl. & Cham.) G.Don; Myrcia acris (Sw.) DC.; Myrcia pimentoides DC.; Myrtus acris Sw.; Myrtus caryophyllata Jacq., nom. illeg. homonym. post.; Myrtus citrifolia Poir.; Myrtus pimentoides (DC.) T.Nees; Myrtus tabasco Willd. ex Schltdl. & Cham.; Pimenta acris (Sw.) Kostel.; Pimenta acris var. pimentoides (DC.) Griseb.; Pimenta acuminata Bello; Pimenta citrifolia (Poir.) Kostel.; Pimenta dioica var. tabasco (Willd. ex Schltdl. & Cham.) Standl.; Pimenta officinalis var. tabasco (Willd. ex Schltdl. & Cham.) O.Berg; Pimenta pimento Griseb.; Pimenta racemosa subsp. occidentalis Urquiola; Pimenta tabasco (Willd. ex Schltdl. & Cham.) Lundell; Pimentus cotinifolia Raf. synonyms of var. terebinthina: Pimenta terebinthina Burret

= Pimenta racemosa =

Species of plant

Pimenta racemosa is a species of plant in the myrtle family (Myrtaceae) that is native to the Caribbean region and Venezuela. Common names include West Indian bay tree, bay rum tree, and ciliment.

== Description ==
The tree is 4–12 m tall and the white flowers, about 10 mm wide, become black, oval fruits measuring 7–12 mm. The ideal conditions for P. racemosa are regular irrigation and bright sunshine.

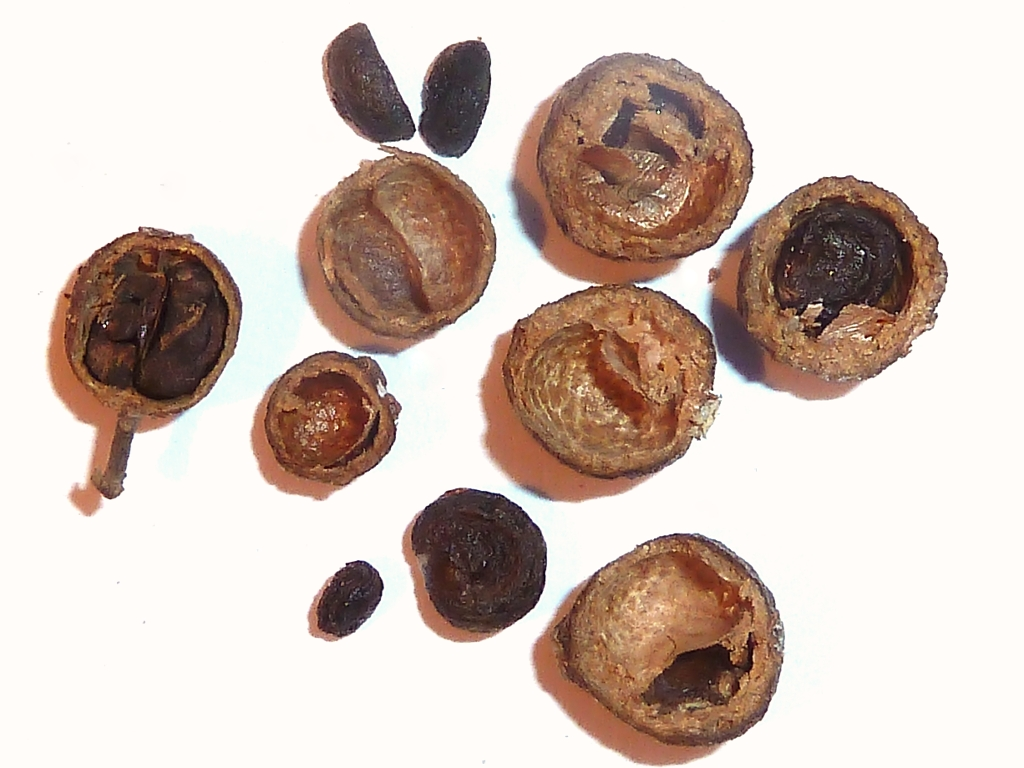
Seeds

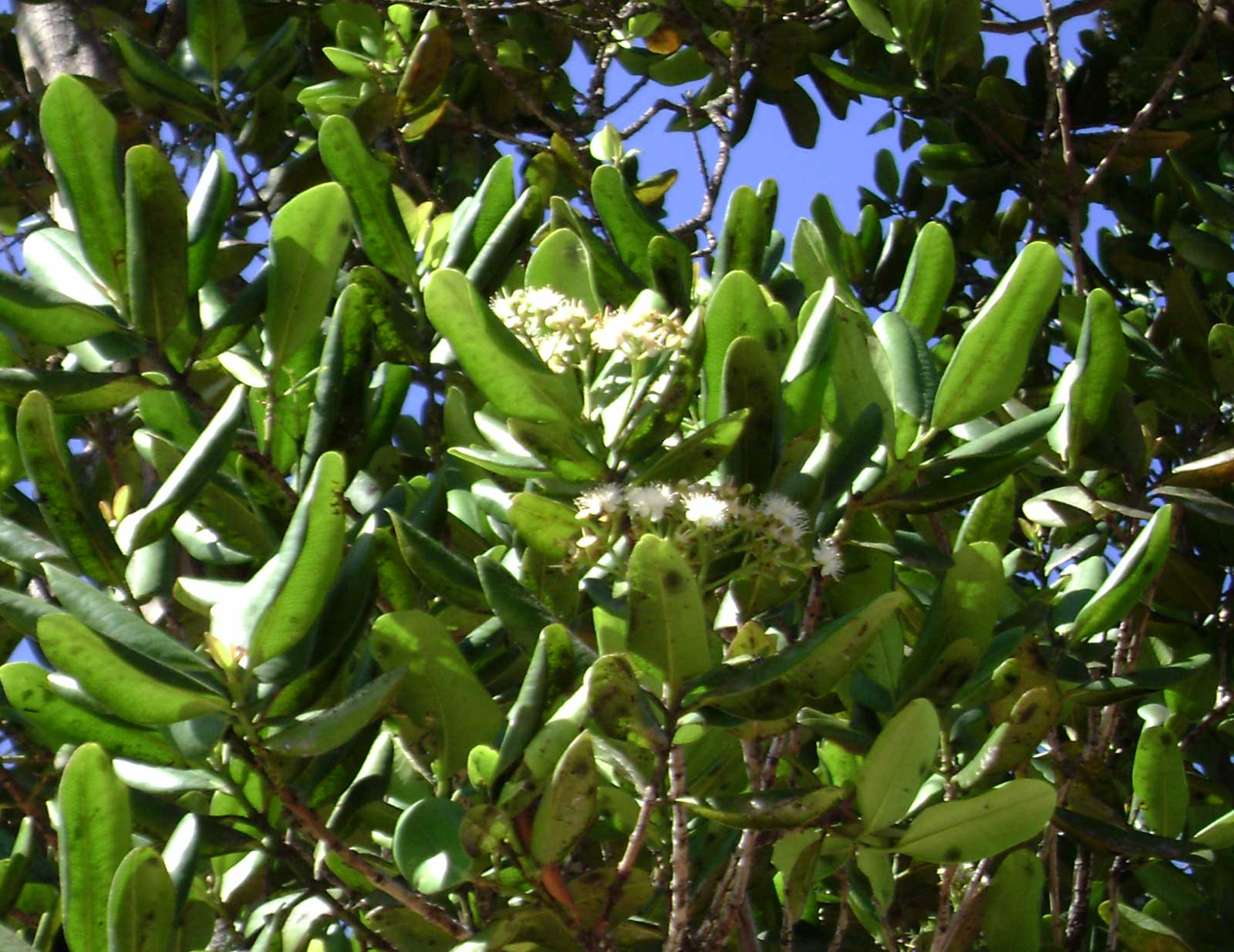
Leaves

== Varieties ==
Five varieties are accepted:

- Pimenta racemosa var. grisea (Kiaersk.) Fosberg – Dominican Republic, Puerto Rico, and Virgin Islands
- Pimenta racemosa var. hispaniolensis (Urb.) Landrum – Hispaniola (Dominican Republic and Haiti)
- Pimenta racemosa var. ozua (Urb. & Ekman) Landrum – north-central Hispaniola (Dominican Republic and Haiti)
- Pimenta racemosa var. racemosa – Cayman Islands, Cuba, Hispaniola, Leeward Islands, Trinidad and Tobago, Venezuela, Venezuelan Antilles, and Windward Islands
- Pimenta racemosa var. terebinthina (Burret) Landrum – northeastern Dominican Republic

== Ecology ==
Pimenta racemosa is widely introduced and can become an invasive weed. The plants are now grown widely in other tropical areas, including Oceania.

== Uses ==
It is used in cooking and an essential oil is distilled to produce a fragrant cologne called bay rum; although the name is similar to names of flavored alcoholic beverages, the concentrated essential oil from the fruit is toxic and renders the product undrinkable. The leaves are also used for herbal teas.

=== Anti-inflammatory and antinociceptive properties ===
Extracts from multiple varieties of Pimenta racemosa display anti-inflammatory properties. These properties are mediated in part by terpenes such as abietic acid and lupeol, which alter neutrophil migration into inflamed regions.

Pimenta racemosa also demonstrates antinociceptive properties and has historically been used as an analgesic in the Caribbean.
