= Ernst August Girschner =

German entomologist (1860–1914)

Ernst August Girschner, usually just Ernst Girschner (29 October 1860 – 28 April 1914) was a German entomologist who specialised in Diptera.

Girschner was born (and died) in Torgau, Province of Saxony, Kingdom of Prussia. He taught at the Gymnasium in Torgau. Girschner described many new species of Diptera but made much more important contributions notably formalising the use of chaetotaxy in Calyptratae "it was the merit of Mr. E. Girschner to give to Chaetotaxy a much greater development and application than it had had before, and to treat it as a sine qua non of descriptive dipterology. His enviable talent for drawing enabled him to illustrate his papers by diagrams more eloquent than any descriptions".

He was a friend of entomologist Josef Mik.

== Works ==
Partial list

- Beitrag zur Systematik der Musciden. Berliner Entomologische Zeitschrift 38: 297–312. in which he introduced the taxon Muscidae acalyptratae (1893.).
- Einiges über die Färbung der Dipterenaugen. Berlin. Ent. Zeitschr.31, 155–162, I plate (1887)
- Ueber einige Musciden Wiener Entomologische Zeitung 17 :151-153

Part of his collection was purchased by Colbran J. Wainwright in 1909 (now in the Natural History Museum London).
