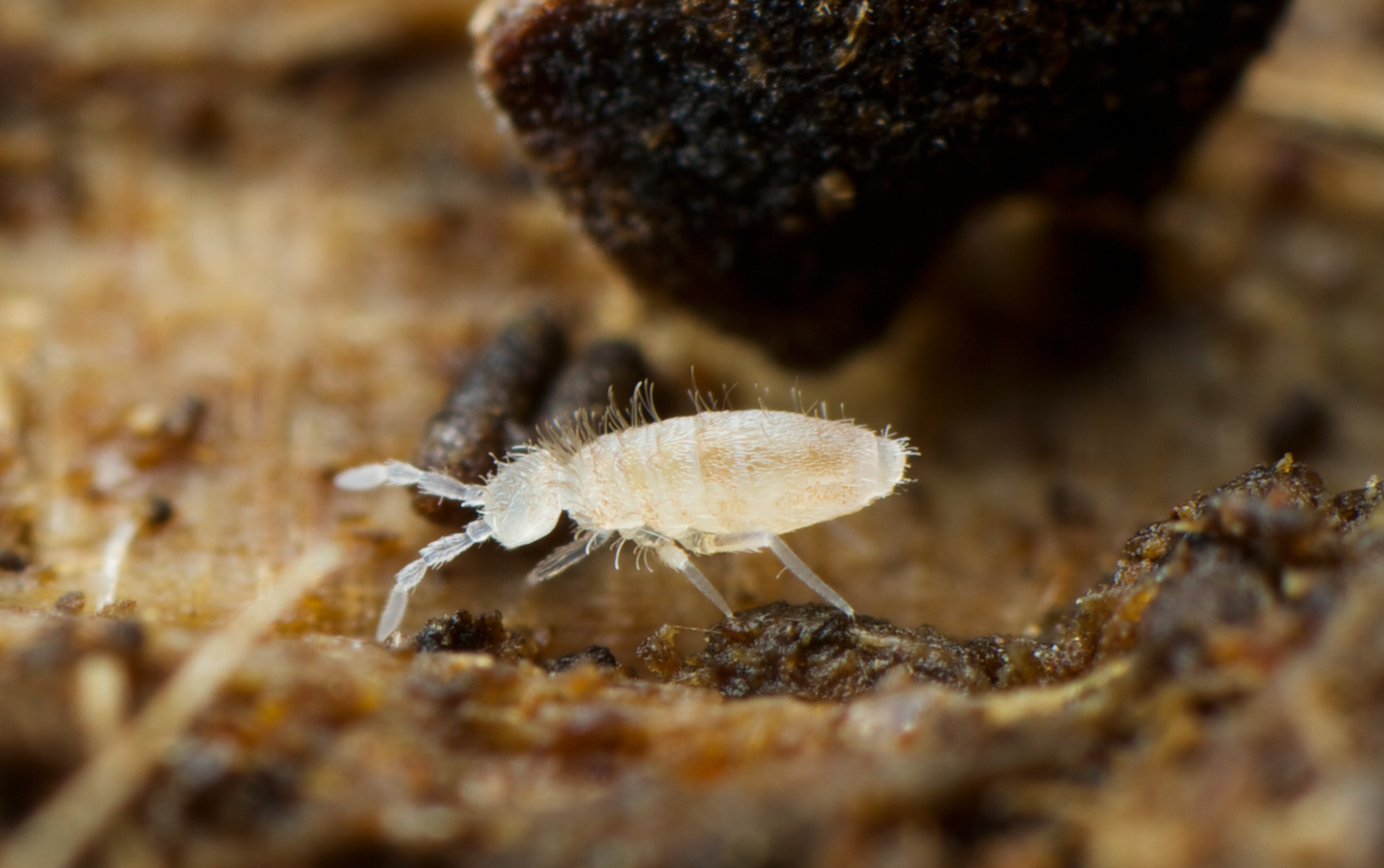
- Cyphoderus

Scientific classification
- Domain: Eukaryota
- Kingdom: Animalia
- Phylum: Arthropoda
- Class: Collembola
- Order: Entomobryomorpha
- Superfamily: Entomobryoidea
- Family: Paronellidae

= Paronellidae =

Family of springtails

Paronellidae is a family of elongate-bodied springtails in the order Entomobryomorpha. There are about 18 genera and at least 90 described species in Paronellidae.

== Genera ==
These 18 genera belong to the family Paronellidae:

- Callyntrura Börner, 1906^{g}
- Campylothorax Schött, 1893^{g}
- Cyphoderopsis Carpenter, 1917^{g}
- Cyphoderus Nicolet, 1842^{i c g b}
- Glacialoca^{c g}
- Lepidonella Yosii, 1960^{g}
- Metacoelura Salmon, 1951^{g}
- Micronellides^{c g}
- Parachaetoceras^{c g}
- Paronana^{c g}
- Paronella Schött, 1893^{g}
- Paronellides^{c g}
- Plumachaetas Salmon, 1951^{g}
- Pseudoparonella^{c g}
- Pseudoparonellides^{c g}
- Salina Macgillivray, 1894^{i c g b}
- Troglopedetes Absolon, 1907^{g}
- Trogolaphysa Mills, 1938^{g}

Data sources: i = ITIS, c = Catalogue of Life, g = GBIF, b = Bugguide.net
