= Megachile verrucosa =

Scientific classification
- Domain: Eukaryota
- Kingdom: Animalia
- Phylum: Arthropoda
- Class: Insecta
- Order: Hymenoptera
- Family: Megachilidae
- Genus: Megachile
- Species: M. verrucosa

Binomial name
- Megachile verrucosa Brèthes, 1910

Species of leafcutter bee (Megachile)

Megachile verrucosa is a species of bee in the family Megachilidae. It was described by Juan Brèthes in 1910.
