= Ateloglutus chilensis =

Scientific classification
- Kingdom: Animalia
- Phylum: Arthropoda
- Class: Insecta
- Order: Diptera
- Family: Tachinidae
- Subfamily: Dexiinae
- Tribe: Voriini
- Genus: Ateloglutus
- Subgenus: Proteloglutus
- Species: A. chilensis

Binomial name
- Ateloglutus chilensis (Brèthes, 1920)

Synonyms
- Phorichaeta chilensis Brèthes, 1920

Species of fly

Ateloglutus chilensis is a species of fly in the family Tachinidae.

== Distribution ==
Chile, Argentina.
