= Trypanaresta =

Scientific classification
- Kingdom: Animalia
- Phylum: Arthropoda
- Class: Insecta
- Order: Diptera
- Family: Tephritidae
- Subfamily: Tephritinae
- Tribe: Tephritini
- Genus: Trypanaresta; Hering, 1940

Type species
- Trypanea imitatrix Hering, 1938

Genus of flies

Trypanaresta is a genus of tephritid or fruit flies in the family Tephritidae.

== Species ==
- Trypanaresta ameghinoi (Brèthes, 1908)
- Trypanaresta coelestina (Hering, 1938)
- Trypanaresta delicatella (Blanchard, 1854)
- Trypanaresta difficilis (Malloch, 1933)
- Trypanaresta dolores (Hering, 1938)
- Trypanaresta flava (Adams, 1904)
- Trypanaresta hestiae (Hendel, 1914)
- Trypanaresta imitatrix (Hering, 1938)
- Trypanaresta miseta (Hering, 1938)
- Trypanaresta plagiata (Blanchard, 1854)
- Trypanaresta scutellata (Séguy, 1933)
- Trypanaresta setulosa (Malloch, 1933)
- Trypanaresta subaster (Malloch, 1933)
- Trypanaresta suspecta (Malloch, 1933)
- Trypanaresta thomsoni (Hendel, 1914)
- Trypanaresta titschacki Hering, 1941
- Trypanaresta valdesiana Gandolfo & Norrbom, 1997
