= Dilatitibialis laterinotata =

Scientific classification
- Kingdom: Animalia
- Phylum: Arthropoda
- Clade: Pancrustacea
- Class: Insecta
- Order: Coleoptera
- Suborder: Polyphaga
- Infraorder: Cucujiformia
- Family: Coccinellidae
- Genus: Dilatitibialis
- Species: D. laterinotata

Binomial name
- Dilatitibialis laterinotata (Brèthes, 1925)

Synonyms
- Hyperaspis laterinotata Mulsant, 1850

Species of beetle

Dilatitibialis laterinotata is a species of beetle of the family Coccinellidae. It is found in Brazil.

== Description ==
Adults reach a length of about 2.6 mm. They have a black body and yellow head. The anterior seven-eight and anterolateral one-fourth of the pronotum are yellow. The elytron has a large triangular yellow marking.
