= Trypanaresta ameghinoi =

Scientific classification
- Kingdom: Animalia
- Phylum: Arthropoda
- Class: Insecta
- Order: Diptera
- Family: Tephritidae
- Subfamily: Tephritinae
- Tribe: Tephritini
- Genus: Trypanaresta
- Species: T. ameghinoi

Binomial name
- Trypanaresta ameghinoi (Brèthes, 1908)

Synonyms
- Urellia ameghinoi Brèthes, 1908

Species of fly

Trypanaresta ameghinoi is a diurnal species of tephritid or fruit flies in the genus Trypanaresta of the family Tephritidae.

== Distribution ==
It is found in Argentina.
