= Ateloglutus =

Scientific classification
- Kingdom: Animalia
- Phylum: Arthropoda
- Class: Insecta
- Order: Diptera
- Family: Tachinidae
- Subfamily: Dexiinae
- Tribe: Voriini
- Genus: Ateloglutus; Aldrich, 1934

Type species
- Ateloglutus ruficornis Aldrich, 1934

Genus of flies

Ateloglutus is a genus of flies in the family Tachinidae.

== Species ==
Subgenus Ateloglutus Aldrich, 1934

- Ateloglutus blanchardi Cortés, 1979
- Ateloglutus lanfrancoi Cortés, 1986
- Ateloglutus ruficornis Aldrich, 1934

Subgenus Proteloglutus Cortés & Valencia, 1972

- Ateloglutus chilensis (Brèthes, 1920)
- Ateloglutus nitens Aldrich, 1934
- Ateloglutus velardei Cortés & Valencia, 1972
