= Hyperaspis elegantissima =

Scientific classification
- Kingdom: Animalia
- Phylum: Arthropoda
- Clade: Pancrustacea
- Class: Insecta
- Order: Coleoptera
- Suborder: Polyphaga
- Infraorder: Cucujiformia
- Family: Coccinellidae
- Genus: Hyperaspis
- Species: H. elegantissima

Binomial name
- Hyperaspis elegantissima Brèthes, 1925

Species of beetle

Hyperaspis elegantissima is a species of beetle of the family Coccinellidae. It is found in Argentina.

== Description ==
Adults reach a length of about 1.8–2.0 mm. They have a black body and yellow head. The anterior margin of the pronotum is yellow and there is a median black area with a large earlike projection in the lateral one-fourth. The lateral and apical margins of the elytron are yellow.
