= Dilatitibialis fallax =

Scientific classification
- Kingdom: Animalia
- Phylum: Arthropoda
- Clade: Pancrustacea
- Class: Insecta
- Order: Coleoptera
- Suborder: Polyphaga
- Infraorder: Cucujiformia
- Family: Coccinellidae
- Genus: Dilatitibialis
- Species: D. fallax

Binomial name
- Dilatitibialis fallax Canepari & Gordon, 2013

Species of beetle

Dilatitibialis fallax is a species of beetle of the family Coccinellidae. It is found in Brazil and French Guiana.

== Description ==
Adults reach a length of about 3.0–3.5 mm. They have a yellow body. The pronotum has a small black marking. The elytron is black with five large yellow spots.

== Etymology ==
The species name is derived from Latin falsus(meaning deceive) and refers to the similar colour patterns of this species and Dilatitibialis jucunda.
