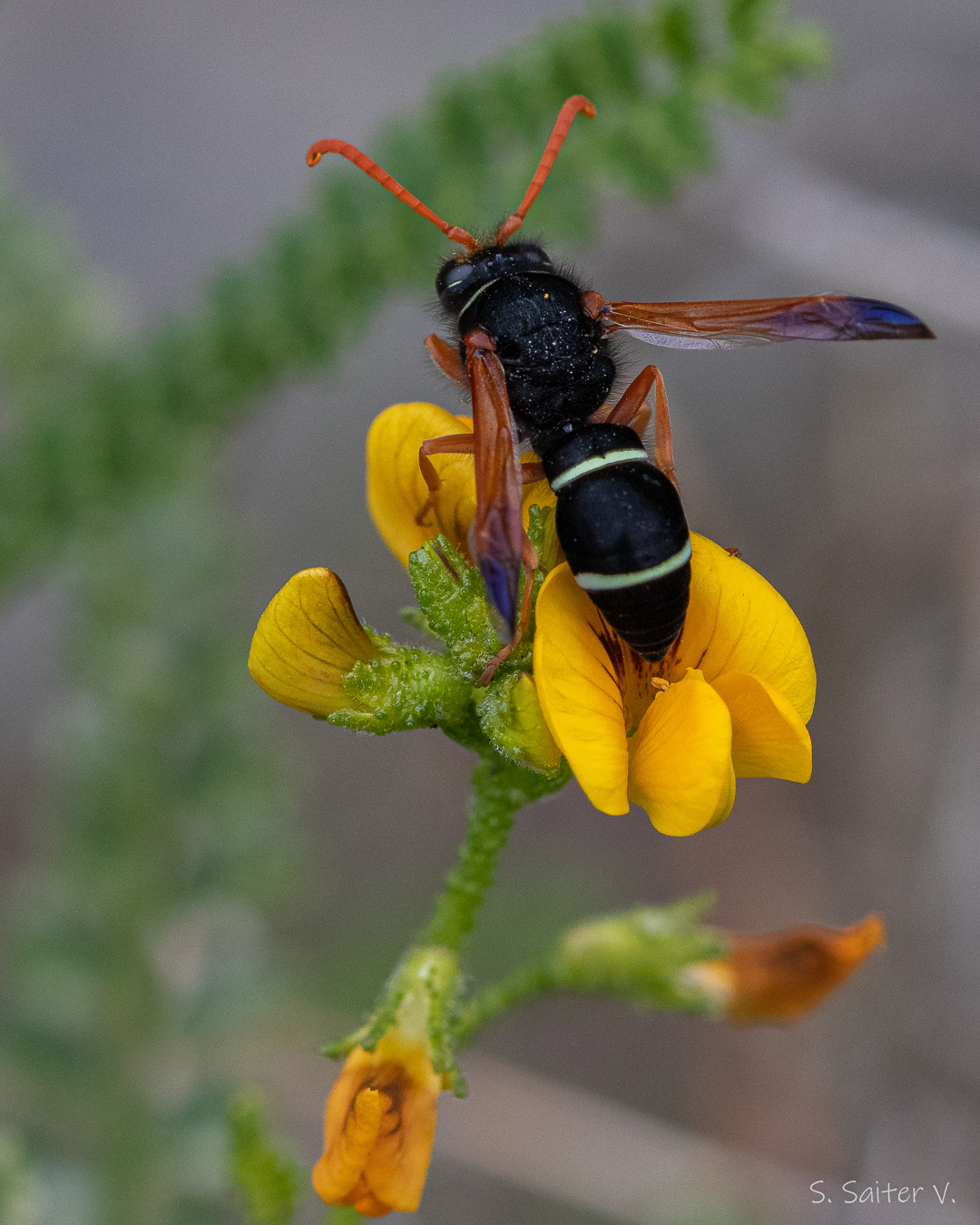
- Hypodynerus labiatus in Magallanes, Chile

Scientific classification
- Domain: Eukaryota
- Kingdom: Animalia
- Phylum: Arthropoda
- Class: Insecta
- Order: Hymenoptera
- Family: Vespidae
- Subfamily: Eumeninae
- Genus: Hypodynerus; Saussure, 1855

Type species
- Odynerus humeralis Haliday, 1836

= Hypodynerus =

Genus of wasps

Hypodynerus is a South American, primarily Andean, genus of potter wasps with most of its described species inhabiting Chile.

== Species ==
The species included in Hypodynerus are:

- H. akros Willink, 1970
- H. albocinctus (Puls, 1868)
- H. andeus (Packer, 1869)
- H. antucensis (Saussure, 1855)
- H. antuco (Saussure, 1852)
- H. arechavaletae Brèthes, 1903
- H. brethesi Jörgensen, 1912
- H. bruchii Brèthes, 1903
- H. caupolicans (Reed, 1893)
- H. Cerberus Bequaert & Ruiz, 1941
- H. chiliensis (Lepeletier, 1841)
- H. chiliotus Saussure, 1852
- H. coarctatus (Saussure, 1852)
- H. colocolo (Saussure, 1852)
- H. dimidiaticornis (Zavattari, 1912)
- H. duckei (Berton, 1918)
- H. excipiendus (Spinola, 1851)
- H. foersteri Giordani Soika, 1961
- H. fuscipennis Brèthes, 1903
- H. heptagonalis Brèthes, 1903
- H. houssayi Willink, 1981
- H. huancabambae Schrottky, 1911
- H. humeralis (Haliday, 1837)
- H. joergenseni Schrottky, 1909
- H. labiatus (Haliday, 1837)
- H. lachensis (Lepeletier, 1841)
- H. mapochu Gribodo, 1894
- H. maypinus (Saussure, 1852)
- H. melancholicus Schrottky, 1909
- H. molinae (Saussure, 1851)
- H. nigricornis Rohwer, 1913
- H. obscuripennis (Spinosa, 1851)
- H. oresbios Willink, 1992
- H. porteri Bequard & Ruiz, 1941
- H. punctatus Brèthes, 1903
- H. ruficollis (Spinosa, 1851)
- H. rufinodis (Buysson, 1913)
- H. rufotegulatus (Zavattari, 1912)
- H. tarabucensis (Saussure, 1856)
- H. torresi Willink, 1970
- H. tuberculiventris (Spinosa, 1851)
- H. vardyi Giordani Soika, 1973
- H. vespiformis (Haliday, 1837)
- H. vestitus Saussure, 1856
- H. villosus (Saussure, 1852)
