= Dilatitibialis gravabilis =

Scientific classification
- Kingdom: Animalia
- Phylum: Arthropoda
- Clade: Pancrustacea
- Class: Insecta
- Order: Coleoptera
- Suborder: Polyphaga
- Infraorder: Cucujiformia
- Family: Coccinellidae
- Genus: Dilatitibialis
- Species: D. gravabilis

Binomial name
- Dilatitibialis gravabilis (Brèthes, 1925)

Synonyms
- Hyperaspis gravabilis Brèthes, 1925

Species of beetle

Dilatitibialis gravabilis is a species of beetle of the family Coccinellidae. It is found in Brazil.

== Description ==
Adults reach a length of about 2.4–2.8 mm. They have a black body. The pronotum has a large yellow anterolateral angle and the median one-fifth of the apex is also yellow. The elytron has six yellow spots.
