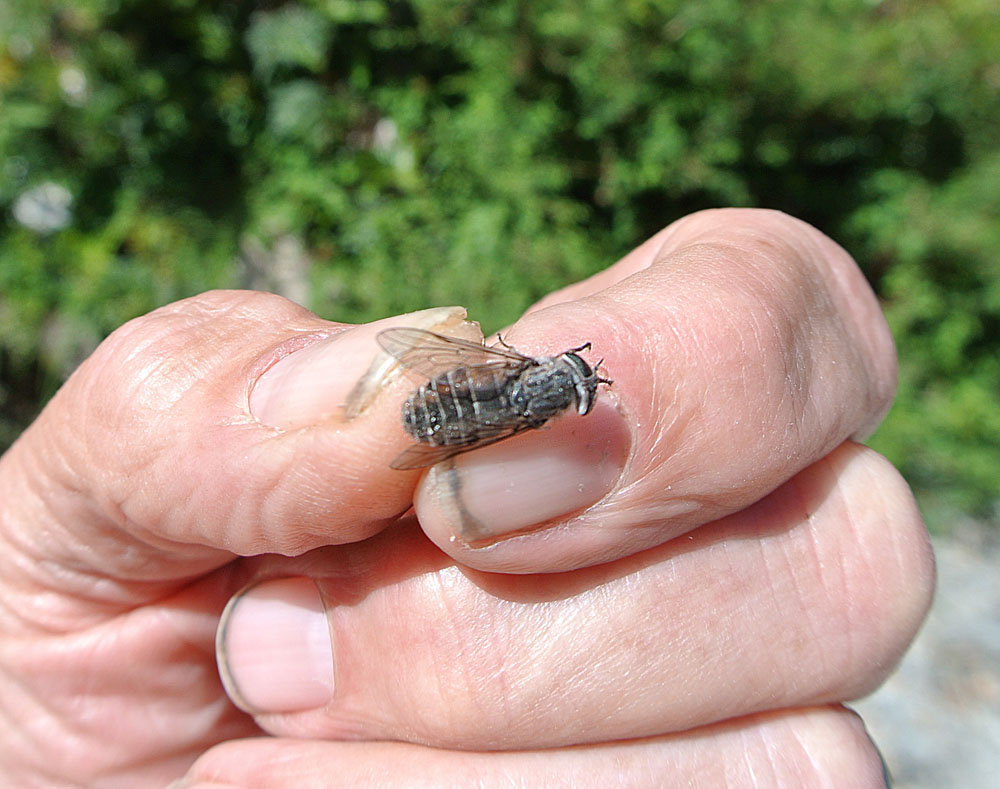
- Dasybasis chilensis

Scientific classification
- Kingdom: Animalia
- Phylum: Arthropoda
- Class: Insecta
- Order: Diptera
- Family: Tabanidae
- Subfamily: Tabaninae
- Tribe: Diachlorini
- Genus: Dasybasis; Macquart, 1847

Type species
- Dasybasis appendiculata Macquart, 1847

Synonyms
- Pseudoselasoma Brèthes, 1910; Stypommia Enderlein, 1922; Archiplatius Enderlein, 1922; Dolichapha Enderlein, 1930; Coscaronia Trojan, 1994; Plesiobasis Trojan, 1994; Mackerrasus Trojan, 1996; Sznablius Trojan, 1996

= Dasybasis =

Genus of flies

Dasybasis is a genus of horse flies in the family Tabanidae.

== Species ==
- Dasybasis acutipalpis (Macquart, 1838)
- Dasybasis adornata (Kröber, 1934)
- Dasybasis albohirta (Walker, 1836)
- Dasybasis albohirtipes (Ferguson, 1921)
- Dasybasis albosignata (Kröber, 1930)
- Dasybasis alticola (Enderlein, 1925)
- Dasybasis andicola (Philippi, 1862)
- Dasybasis angusticallus (Ricardo, 1917)
- Dasybasis anomala Mackerras & Rageau, 1958
- Dasybasis antillanca González, 2014
- Dasybasis antilope (Brèthes, 1910)
- Dasybasis appendiculata Macquart, 1847
- Dasybasis arauca Coscarón & Philip, 1967
- Dasybasis argentina (Brèthes, 1910)
- Dasybasis arica Coscarón & Philip, 1967
- Dasybasis banksiensis (Ferguson & Hill, 1922)
- Dasybasis barbata Coscarón & Philip, 1967
- Dasybasis bejaranoi Coscarón & Philip, 1967
- Dasybasis belenensis Coscarón & Philip, 1967
- Dasybasis boliviame Coscarón & Philip, 1967
- Dasybasis bonariensis (Macquart, 1838)
- Dasybasis bratrankii (Nowicki, 1875)
- Dasybasis brethesi Coscarón & Philip, 1967
- Dasybasis bruchii (Brèthes, 1910)
- Dasybasis bulbiscapens Coscarón & Philip, 1967
- Dasybasis bulbula Coscarón & Philip, 1967
- Dasybasis caesia (Walker, 1848)
- Dasybasis calchaqui Coscarón & Philip, 1967
- Dasybasis canipilis (Kröber, 1934)
- Dasybasis caprii Coscarón & Philip, 1967
- Dasybasis chazeaui Trojan, 1991
- Dasybasis chilensis (Macquart, 1838)
- Dasybasis chillan Coscarón, 1972
- Dasybasis chubutensis Coscarón, 1962
- Dasybasis circumdata (Walker, 1848)
- Dasybasis cirra (Ricardo, 1917)
- Dasybasis cirrus (Ricardo, 1917)
- Dasybasis clavicallosa (Ricardo, 1917)
- Dasybasis colla Coscarón, 1969
- Dasybasis collagua González, 2014
- Dasybasis columbiana (Enderlein, 1925)
- Dasybasis constans (Walker, 1848)
- Dasybasis coquimbo Coscarón, 1972
- Dasybasis cretacea (Fedotova, 1991)
- Dasybasis cumelafquen Coscarón, 1962
- Dasybasis danielae Trojan, 1991
- Dasybasis delpontei Coscarón & Philip, 1967
- Dasybasis diaguita Coscarón & González, 1990
- Dasybasis diemanensis (Ferguson, 1921)
- Dasybasis difficilis (Kröber, 1931)
- Dasybasis dixoni (Ferguson, 1921)
- Dasybasis dubiosa (Ricardo, 1915)
- Dasybasis edentula (Macquart, 1846)
- Dasybasis eidsvoldensis (Taylor, 1919)
- Dasybasis elquiensis González, 2000
- Dasybasis erynnis (Brèthes, 1910)
- Dasybasis evenhuisi Burger, 1995
- Dasybasis excelsior Fairchild, 1956
- Dasybasis exulans (Erichson, 1842)
- Dasybasis fairchildi Coscarón & Philip, 1967
- Dasybasis fornesi Coscarón, 1974
- Dasybasis foroma Coscarón & Philip, 1967
- Dasybasis frequens (Kröber, 1934)
- Dasybasis froggatti (Ricardo, 1915)
- Dasybasis fumifrons Coscarón & Philip, 1967
- Dasybasis gemella (Walker, 1848)
- Dasybasis geminata Coscarón & Philip, 1967
- Dasybasis gentilis (Erichson, 1842)
- Dasybasis germanica (Ricardo, 1915)
- Dasybasis gracilipalpis Burger, 1995
- Dasybasis gregaria (Erichson, 1842)
- Dasybasis grenieri (Mackerras & Rageau, 1958)
- Dasybasis griseoannulata (Taylor, 1917)
- Dasybasis hebes (Walker, 1848)
- Dasybasis hepperi Coscarón & Philip, 1967
- Dasybasis hirsuta Coscarón & Philip, 1967
- Dasybasis hobartiensis (White, 1915)
- Dasybasis imperfecta (Walker, 1848)
- Dasybasis inata Coscarón & Philip, 1967
- Dasybasis indefinita (Taylor, 1918)
- Dasybasis innotata (Ferguson & Henry, 1920)
- Dasybasis kewensis (Ferguson & Henry, 1920)
- Dasybasis kroeberi Coscarón & Philip, 1967
- Dasybasis kuniae (Mackerras & Rageau, 1958)
- Dasybasis limbativena (Kröber, 1931)
- Dasybasis loewi (Enderlein, 1925)
- Dasybasis lydiae Trojan, 1991
- Dasybasis macrophthalma (Schiner, 1868)
- Dasybasis maletecta (Bigot, 1892)
- Dasybasis mellicallosa Mackerras & Rageau, 1958
- Dasybasis mendozana (Enderlein, 1925)
- Dasybasis microdonta (Mackerras, 1947)
- Dasybasis microdonta (Macquart, 1847)
- Dasybasis milsoni (Ricardo, 1917)
- Dasybasis milsoni (Taylor, 1917)
- Dasybasis minor (Macquart, 1850)
- Dasybasis missionum (Macquart, 1838)
- Dasybasis montium (Surcouf, 1919)
- Dasybasis moretonensis (Ferguson & Hill, 1922)
- Dasybasis nemopunctata (Ricardo, 1914)
- Dasybasis nemotuberculata (Ricardo, 1914)
- Dasybasis neobasalis (Taylor, 1918)
- Dasybasis neocirrus (Ricardo, 1917)
- Dasybasis neogermanica (Ricardo, 1915)
- Dasybasis neogrisescens (Kröber, 1934)
- Dasybasis neolatifrons (Ferguson & Hill, 1922)
- Dasybasis neopalpalis (Ferguson & Hill, 1920)
- Dasybasis nigra (Enderlein, 1925)
- Dasybasis nigrifemur (Kröber, 1934)
- Dasybasis nigrifrons (Philippi, 1863)
- Dasybasis nigripes (Kröber, 1931)
- Dasybasis ochreoflava (Ferguson & Henry, 1920)
- Dasybasis oculata (Ricardo, 1915)
- Dasybasis opaca (Brèthes, 1910)
- Dasybasis opla (Walker, 1850)
- Dasybasis ornatissima (Brèthes, 1910)
- Dasybasis padix (Taylor, 1917)
- Dasybasis pallipes (Kröber, 1931)
- Dasybasis parva (Taylor, 1913)
- Dasybasis penai Coscarón & Philip, 1967
- Dasybasis perdignata (Kröber, 1934)
- Dasybasis pereirai Coscarón & Philip, 1967
- Dasybasis ponandouensis Burger, 1995
- Dasybasis postica (Wiedemann, 1828)
- Dasybasis postponens (Walker, 1848)
- Dasybasis pseudocallosa (Ferguson & Hill, 1922)
- Dasybasis punensis (Hine, 1920)
- Dasybasis rageaui Mackerras, 1962
- Dasybasis rainbowi (Taylor, 1918)
- Dasybasis regisgeorgii (Macquart, 1838)
- Dasybasis rieki Ferguson & Yeates, 2015
- Dasybasis rubicallosa (Ricardo, 1914)
- Dasybasis rufifrons (Macquart, 1855)
- Dasybasis sarpa (Walker, 1850)
- Dasybasis schineri (Kröber, 1931)
- Dasybasis schnusei (Kröber, 1931)
- Dasybasis senilis (Philippi, 1865)
- Dasybasis setipalpis Burger, 1995
- Dasybasis shannoni (Kröber, 1930)
- Dasybasis spadix (Taylor, 1917)
- Dasybasis spatiosa (Ricardo, 1915)
- Dasybasis standfasti Mackerras, 1964
- Dasybasis subtrita Coscarón & Philip, 1967
- Dasybasis tasmaniensis (White, 1915)
- Dasybasis testaceomaculata (Macquart, 1838)
- Dasybasis thereviformis Mackerras, 1957
- Dasybasis tillierorum Trojan, 1991
- Dasybasis transversa (Walker, 1854)
- Dasybasis trigonophora (Macquart, 1838)
- Dasybasis trilinealis (Ferguson & Henry, 1920)
- Dasybasis tritus (Walker, 1836)
- Dasybasis truncata (Walker, 1850)
- Dasybasis tryphera (Taylor, 1917)
- Dasybasis vasta Coscarón & Philip, 1967
- Dasybasis vespiformis (Ferguson & Henry, 1920)
- Dasybasis vetusta (Walker, 1848)
- Dasybasis viridis (Hudson, 1892)
