= Proteloglutus =

Scientific classification
- Kingdom: Animalia
- Phylum: Arthropoda
- Class: Insecta
- Order: Diptera
- Family: Tachinidae
- Subfamily: Dexiinae
- Tribe: Voriini
- Genus: Ateloglutus
- Subgenus: Proteloglutus; Cortés & Valencia, 1972

Type species
- Phorichaeta chilensis Brèthes, 1920

Subgenus of flies

Proteloglutus is a subgenus of flies in the family Tachinidae.

== Species ==
- Ateloglutus chilensis (Brèthes, 1920)
- Ateloglutus nitens Aldrich, 1934
- Ateloglutus velardei Cortés & Valencia, 1972
