= Trypanaresta difficilis =

Scientific classification
- Kingdom: Animalia
- Phylum: Arthropoda
- Class: Insecta
- Order: Diptera
- Family: Tephritidae
- Subfamily: Tephritinae
- Tribe: Tephritini
- Genus: Trypanaresta
- Species: T. difficilis

Binomial name
- Trypanaresta difficilis (Malloch, 1933)

Synonyms
- Trypanea difficilis Malloch, 1933

Species of fly

Trypanaresta difficilis is a species of tephritid or fruit flies in the genus Trypanaresta of the family Tephritidae.

== Distribution ==
Argentina.
