= Dilatitibialis lillian =

Scientific classification
- Kingdom: Animalia
- Phylum: Arthropoda
- Clade: Pancrustacea
- Class: Insecta
- Order: Coleoptera
- Suborder: Polyphaga
- Infraorder: Cucujiformia
- Family: Coccinellidae
- Genus: Dilatitibialis
- Species: D. lillian

Binomial name
- Dilatitibialis lillian Canepari & Gordon, 2013

Species of beetle

Dilatitibialis lillian is a species of beetle of the family Coccinellidae. It is found in Paraguay.

== Description ==
Adults reach a length of about 2.6 mm. They have a dark brown body. The pronotum has a large yellow anterolateral angle and the median one-fourth of the apex is also yellow. The elytron has five yellow spots.
