= Dilatitibialis mulsanti =

Scientific classification
- Kingdom: Animalia
- Phylum: Arthropoda
- Clade: Pancrustacea
- Class: Insecta
- Order: Coleoptera
- Suborder: Polyphaga
- Infraorder: Cucujiformia
- Family: Coccinellidae
- Genus: Dilatitibialis
- Species: D. mulsanti

Binomial name
- Dilatitibialis mulsanti (Kirsch, 1876)

Synonyms
- Cleothera mulsanti Kirsch, 1876

Species of beetle

Dilatitibialis mulsanti is a species of beetle of the family Coccinellidae. It is found in Brazil, Colombia, Ecuador and Peru.

== Description ==
Adults reach a length of about 3.2–3.7 mm. They have a yellow body. The pronotum has two small brown spots. The sutural and lateral margins of the elytron have a brown border and there are five small brown spots.
