= Dilatitibialis rosa =

Scientific classification
- Kingdom: Animalia
- Phylum: Arthropoda
- Clade: Pancrustacea
- Class: Insecta
- Order: Coleoptera
- Suborder: Polyphaga
- Infraorder: Cucujiformia
- Family: Coccinellidae
- Genus: Dilatitibialis
- Species: D. rosa

Binomial name
- Dilatitibialis rosa Canepari & Gordon, 2013

Species of beetle

Dilatitibialis rosa is a species of beetle of the family Coccinellidae. It is found in Trinidad.

== Description ==
Adults reach a length of about 2.0-2.1 mm. They have a yellow body. The pronotum has a large dark brown oval marking. The elytron has two dark brown spots.
