= Dilatitibialis oseryi =

Scientific classification
- Kingdom: Animalia
- Phylum: Arthropoda
- Clade: Pancrustacea
- Class: Insecta
- Order: Coleoptera
- Suborder: Polyphaga
- Infraorder: Cucujiformia
- Family: Coccinellidae
- Genus: Dilatitibialis
- Species: D. oseryi

Binomial name
- Dilatitibialis oseryi (Mulsant, 1850)

Synonyms
- Cleothera oseryi Mulsant, 1850

Species of beetle

Dilatitibialis oseryi is a species of beetle of the family Coccinellidae. It is found in Brazil.

== Description ==
Adults reach a length of about 2.2–2.7 mm. They have a yellow body. The pronotum has a black marking. The elytron is reddish yellow and there is a small yellow spot on the humeral angle. The suture is bordered with black vitta and there is a black oval apical spot.
