= Dilatitibialis fuscomaculata =

Scientific classification
- Kingdom: Animalia
- Phylum: Arthropoda
- Clade: Pancrustacea
- Class: Insecta
- Order: Coleoptera
- Suborder: Polyphaga
- Infraorder: Cucujiformia
- Family: Coccinellidae
- Genus: Dilatitibialis
- Species: D. fuscomaculata

Binomial name
- Dilatitibialis fuscomaculata (Mulsant, 1850)

Synonyms
- Cleothera fuscomaculata Mulsant, 1850

Species of beetle

Dilatitibialis fuscomaculata is a species of beetle of the family Coccinellidae. It is found in southeastern Brazil.

== Description ==
Adults reach a length of about 2.6–3.1 mm. They have a yellow body. The pronotum has seven brown spots and the elytron has five brown spots.
