= Ateloglutus ruficornis =

Scientific classification
- Kingdom: Animalia
- Phylum: Arthropoda
- Class: Insecta
- Order: Diptera
- Family: Tachinidae
- Subfamily: Dexiinae
- Tribe: Voriini
- Genus: Ateloglutus
- Subgenus: Ateloglutus
- Species: A. ruficornis

Binomial name
- Ateloglutus ruficornis Aldrich, 1934

Species of fly

Ateloglutus ruficornis is a species of fly in the family Tachinidae.

== Distribution ==
Chile, Argentina.
