= Dilatitibialis sherry =

Scientific classification
- Kingdom: Animalia
- Phylum: Arthropoda
- Clade: Pancrustacea
- Class: Insecta
- Order: Coleoptera
- Suborder: Polyphaga
- Infraorder: Cucujiformia
- Family: Coccinellidae
- Genus: Dilatitibialis
- Species: D. sherry

Binomial name
- Dilatitibialis sherry Canepari & Gordon, 2013

Species of beetle

Dilatitibialis sherry is a species of beetle of the family Coccinellidae. It is found in Brazil.

== Description ==
Adults reach a length of about 2.6 mm. They have a black body and yellow head. The pronotum has a large black marking. The elytron has two small pale spots.
