= Dilatitibialis glyphica =

Scientific classification
- Kingdom: Animalia
- Phylum: Arthropoda
- Clade: Pancrustacea
- Class: Insecta
- Order: Coleoptera
- Suborder: Polyphaga
- Infraorder: Cucujiformia
- Family: Coccinellidae
- Genus: Dilatitibialis
- Species: D. glyphica

Binomial name
- Dilatitibialis glyphica (Mulsant, 1850)

Synonyms
- Cleothera glyphica Mulsant, 1850

Species of beetle

Dilatitibialis glyphica is a species of beetle of the family Coccinellidae. It is found in Brazil.

== Description ==
Adults reach a length of about 2.6–3.9 mm. They have a yellow body. The pronotum has seven brown spots, while the elytron has nine small brown spots.
