= Dilatitibialis carolinae =

Scientific classification
- Kingdom: Animalia
- Phylum: Arthropoda
- Clade: Pancrustacea
- Class: Insecta
- Order: Coleoptera
- Suborder: Polyphaga
- Infraorder: Cucujiformia
- Family: Coccinellidae
- Genus: Dilatitibialis
- Species: D. carolinae

Binomial name
- Dilatitibialis carolinae (Crotch, 1874)

Synonyms
- Hyperaspis carolinae Crotch, 1874; Cleothera boliviana Weise, 1910

Species of beetle

Dilatitibialis carolinae is a species of beetle of the family Coccinellidae. It is found in Brazil, Peru, Trinidad and Venezuela.

== Description ==
Adults reach a length of about 2.0–2.7 mm. They have a yellow body. The pronotum has five small triangular black spots. The elytron has a brown border and six brown spots.
