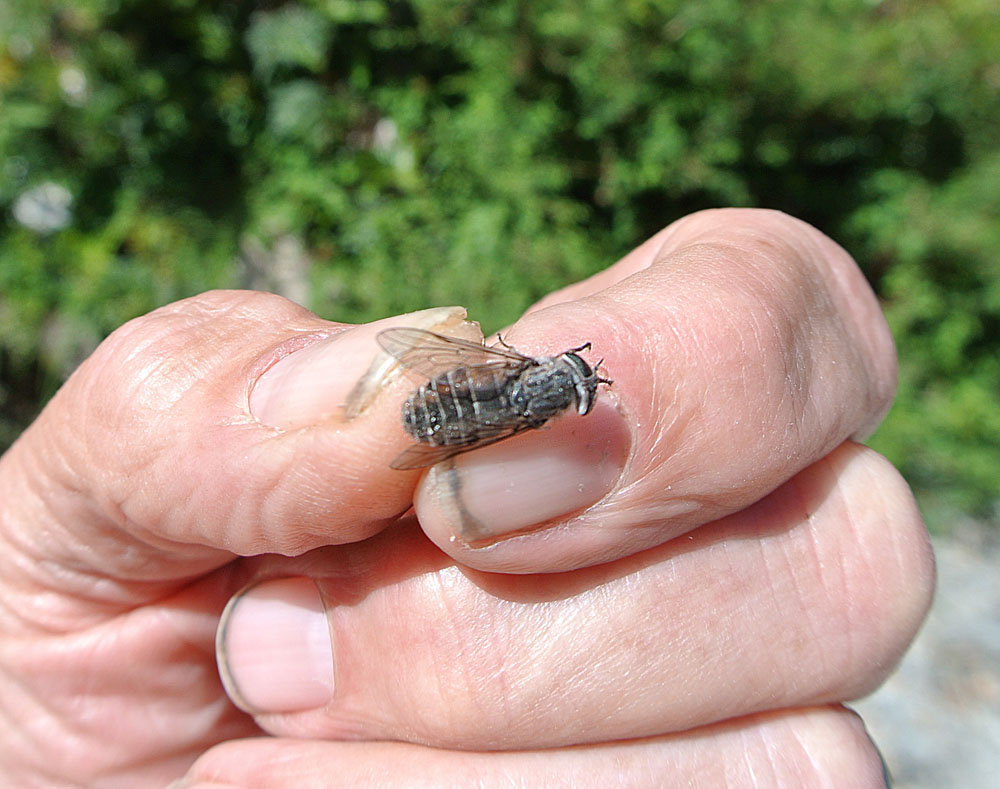
- Dasybasis chilensis

Scientific classification
- Kingdom: Animalia
- Phylum: Arthropoda
- Class: Insecta
- Order: Diptera
- Family: Tabanidae
- Subfamily: Tabaninae
- Tribe: Diachlorini
- Genus: Dasybasis
- Species: D. chilensis

Binomial name
- Dasybasis chilensis (Macquart, 1838)

Synonyms
- Tabanus chilensis Macquart, 1838; Tabanus trifarius Macquart, 1838; Tabanus maculiventris Macquart, 1850; Tabanus rubrifrons Blanchard, 1854; Tabanus rubromarginatus Blanchard, 1854; Tabanus fulvipes Philippi, 1865; Agelanius interpositus Rondani, 1868; Tabanus pachnodes Schiner, 1868

= Dasybasis chilensis =

Species of fly

Dasybasis chilensis is a species of deer fly in the family Tabanidae.

== Distribution ==
Chile, Argentina.
