= Dilatitibialis gaynoni =

Scientific classification
- Kingdom: Animalia
- Phylum: Arthropoda
- Clade: Pancrustacea
- Class: Insecta
- Order: Coleoptera
- Suborder: Polyphaga
- Infraorder: Cucujiformia
- Family: Coccinellidae
- Genus: Dilatitibialis
- Species: D. gaynoni

Binomial name
- Dilatitibialis gaynoni (Mulsant, 1850)

Synonyms
- Cleothera gaynoni Mulsant, 1850

Species of beetle

Dilatitibialis gaynoni is a species of beetle of the family Coccinellidae. It is found in Brazil.

== Description ==
Adults reach a length of about 2.4 mm. They have a reddish yellow body. The pronotum is black, with the anterolateral angle reddish yellow. The elytron is black with five reddish yellow spots.
