= Dilatitibialis kim =

Scientific classification
- Kingdom: Animalia
- Phylum: Arthropoda
- Clade: Pancrustacea
- Class: Insecta
- Order: Coleoptera
- Suborder: Polyphaga
- Infraorder: Cucujiformia
- Family: Coccinellidae
- Genus: Dilatitibialis
- Species: D. kim

Binomial name
- Dilatitibialis kim Canepari & Gordon, 2013

Species of beetle

Dilatitibialis kim is a species of beetle of the family Coccinellidae. It is found in Brazil.

== Description ==
Adults reach a length of about 2.7–3.3 mm. They have a black body and yellow head. The pronotum is yellow with a large black marking. The elytron has three small yellow spots.
