= Dilatitibialis grace =

Scientific classification
- Kingdom: Animalia
- Phylum: Arthropoda
- Clade: Pancrustacea
- Class: Insecta
- Order: Coleoptera
- Suborder: Polyphaga
- Infraorder: Cucujiformia
- Family: Coccinellidae
- Genus: Dilatitibialis
- Species: D. grace

Binomial name
- Dilatitibialis grace Canepari & Gordon, 2013

Species of beetle

Dilatitibialis grace is a species of beetle of the family Coccinellidae. It is found in Bolivia.

== Description ==
Adults reach a length of about 2.3 mm. They have a black body and yellow head. The pronotum has a black marking. The elytron has two pale spots, one small and yellow and the other large and reddish yellow.
