= Dilatitibialis hybridula =

Scientific classification
- Kingdom: Animalia
- Phylum: Arthropoda
- Clade: Pancrustacea
- Class: Insecta
- Order: Coleoptera
- Suborder: Polyphaga
- Infraorder: Cucujiformia
- Family: Coccinellidae
- Genus: Dilatitibialis
- Species: D. hybridula

Binomial name
- Dilatitibialis hybridula (Crotch, 1874)

Synonyms
- Hyperaspis hybridula Crotch, 1874

Species of beetle

Dilatitibialis hybridula is a species of beetle of the family Coccinellidae. It is found in Argentina and Brazil.

== Description ==
Adults reach a length of about 3.6-4.0 mm. They have a yellow body. The pronotum has seven brown spots and the elytron also has seven brown spots.
