= Dilatitibialis florifera =

Scientific classification
- Kingdom: Animalia
- Phylum: Arthropoda
- Clade: Pancrustacea
- Class: Insecta
- Order: Coleoptera
- Suborder: Polyphaga
- Infraorder: Cucujiformia
- Family: Coccinellidae
- Genus: Dilatitibialis
- Species: D. florifera

Binomial name
- Dilatitibialis florifera (Vogel, 1865)

Synonyms
- Cleothera florifera Vogel, 1865

Species of beetle

Dilatitibialis florifera is a species of beetle of the family Coccinellidae. It is found in Colombia.

== Description ==
Adults reach a length of about 2.4–2.5 mm. They have a light brown body. The pronotum however, is yellow with a M-shaped marking. The elytron has five large yellow spots.
