= Dilatitibialis gladys =

Scientific classification
- Kingdom: Animalia
- Phylum: Arthropoda
- Clade: Pancrustacea
- Class: Insecta
- Order: Coleoptera
- Suborder: Polyphaga
- Infraorder: Cucujiformia
- Family: Coccinellidae
- Genus: Dilatitibialis
- Species: D. gladys

Binomial name
- Dilatitibialis gladys Canepari & Gordon, 2013

Species of beetle

Dilatitibialis gladys is a species of beetle of the family Coccinellidae. It is found in Brazil.

== Description ==
Adults reach a length of about 2.3–2.4 mm. They have a yellow body. The pronotum has six small brown spots. The elytron has four brown spots.
