= Dilatitibialis ceciliae =

Scientific classification
- Kingdom: Animalia
- Phylum: Arthropoda
- Clade: Pancrustacea
- Class: Insecta
- Order: Coleoptera
- Suborder: Polyphaga
- Infraorder: Cucujiformia
- Family: Coccinellidae
- Genus: Dilatitibialis
- Species: D. ceciliae

Binomial name
- Dilatitibialis ceciliae (Crotch, 1874)

Synonyms
- Hyperaspis ceciliae Crotch, 1874

Species of beetle

Dilatitibialis ceciliae is a species of beetle of the family Coccinellidae. It is found in Argentina, Brazil and Paraguay.

== Description ==
Adults reach a length of about 3.3–3.4 mm. They have a yellow body, the head with five slightly darker yellow spots. The pronotum is yellow with seven brown spots. The elytron has seven dark brown spots.
