= Trypanaresta scutellata =

Scientific classification
- Kingdom: Animalia
- Phylum: Arthropoda
- Class: Insecta
- Order: Diptera
- Family: Tephritidae
- Subfamily: Tephritinae
- Tribe: Tephritini
- Genus: Trypanaresta
- Species: T. scutellata

Binomial name
- Trypanaresta scutellata (Séguy, 1933)

Synonyms
- Acanthiophilus scutellata Séguy, 1933

Species of fly

Trypanaresta scutellata is a species of tephritid or fruit flies in the genus Trypanaresta of the family Tephritidae.

== Distribution ==
Ecuador, Peru, Bolivia, Chile, Argentina.
