= Dilatitibialis shannon =

Scientific classification
- Kingdom: Animalia
- Phylum: Arthropoda
- Clade: Pancrustacea
- Class: Insecta
- Order: Coleoptera
- Suborder: Polyphaga
- Infraorder: Cucujiformia
- Family: Coccinellidae
- Genus: Dilatitibialis
- Species: D. shannon

Binomial name
- Dilatitibialis shannon Canepari & Gordon, 2013

Species of beetle

Dilatitibialis shannon is a species of beetle of the family Coccinellidae. It is found in Peru and Brazil.

== Description ==
Adults reach a length of about 2.5–2.6 mm. They have a black body and yellow head. The apical one-sixth and lateral one-fourth of the pronotum are yellow and there is a black marking. The elytron has three yellow spots.
