= Dilatitibialis annie =

Scientific classification
- Kingdom: Animalia
- Phylum: Arthropoda
- Clade: Pancrustacea
- Class: Insecta
- Order: Coleoptera
- Suborder: Polyphaga
- Infraorder: Cucujiformia
- Family: Coccinellidae
- Genus: Dilatitibialis
- Species: D. annie

Binomial name
- Dilatitibialis annie Canepari & Gordon, 2013

Species of beetle

Dilatitibialis annie is a species of beetle of the family Coccinellidae. It is found in Venezuela.

== Description ==
Adults reach a length of about 2.8–3.2 mm. They have a yellow body. The pronotum has two pale brown spots. The suture of the elytron is dark brown and there are two transverse dark brown vittae.
