= Dilatitibialis cruciferae =

Scientific classification
- Kingdom: Animalia
- Phylum: Arthropoda
- Clade: Pancrustacea
- Class: Insecta
- Order: Coleoptera
- Suborder: Polyphaga
- Infraorder: Cucujiformia
- Family: Coccinellidae
- Genus: Dilatitibialis
- Species: D. cruciferae

Binomial name
- Dilatitibialis cruciferae (Mulsant, 1850)

Synonyms
- Cleothera cruciferae Mulsant, 1850

Species of beetle

Dilatitibialis cruciferae is a species of beetle of the family Coccinellidae. It is found in Brazil.

== Description ==
Adults reach a length of about 3.1 mm. They have a reddish yellow body. The pronotum is mostly black with the anterior border, an area in the lateral one-fourth and small spot yellow. The basal and sutural margins of the elytron are dark brown and there are four large dark brown spots.
