= Dilatitibialis norma =

Scientific classification
- Kingdom: Animalia
- Phylum: Arthropoda
- Clade: Pancrustacea
- Class: Insecta
- Order: Coleoptera
- Suborder: Polyphaga
- Infraorder: Cucujiformia
- Family: Coccinellidae
- Genus: Dilatitibialis
- Species: D. norma

Binomial name
- Dilatitibialis norma Canepari & Gordon, 2013

Species of beetle

Dilatitibialis norma is a species of beetle of the family Coccinellidae. It is found in Colombia.

== Description ==
Adults reach a length of about 2.8–3.4 mm. They have a yellow body. The basal half of the pronotum has a black border. The elytron is yellow with a black sutural border. The lateral and apical margins are also black and there are three small brown spots.
