= Dilatitibialis elaine =

Scientific classification
- Kingdom: Animalia
- Phylum: Arthropoda
- Clade: Pancrustacea
- Class: Insecta
- Order: Coleoptera
- Suborder: Polyphaga
- Infraorder: Cucujiformia
- Family: Coccinellidae
- Genus: Dilatitibialis
- Species: D. elaine

Binomial name
- Dilatitibialis elaine Canepari & Gordon, 2013

Species of beetle

Dilatitibialis elaine is a species of beetle of the family Coccinellidae. It is found in Brazil.

== Description ==
Adults reach a length of about 3 mm. They have a brown body and yellow head. The pronotum has a brown marking. The elytron has five small yellow spots.
