= Dilatitibialis tracy =

Scientific classification
- Kingdom: Animalia
- Phylum: Arthropoda
- Clade: Pancrustacea
- Class: Insecta
- Order: Coleoptera
- Suborder: Polyphaga
- Infraorder: Cucujiformia
- Family: Coccinellidae
- Genus: Dilatitibialis
- Species: D. tracy

Binomial name
- Dilatitibialis tracy Canepari & Gordon, 2013

Species of beetle

Dilatitibialis tracy is a species of beetle of the family Coccinellidae. It is found in Brazil.

== Description ==
Adults reach a length of about 2.5 mm. They have a black body and a yellow head. The lateral one-fourth and anterior one-sixth of the pronotum are yellow. The elytron has three small yellow spots.
