= Trypanaresta setulosa =

Scientific classification
- Kingdom: Animalia
- Phylum: Arthropoda
- Class: Insecta
- Order: Diptera
- Family: Tephritidae
- Subfamily: Tephritinae
- Tribe: Tephritini
- Genus: Trypanaresta
- Species: T. setulosa

Binomial name
- Trypanaresta setulosa (Hering, 1938)

Synonyms
- Trypanea setulosa Hering, 1938

Species of fly

Trypanaresta setulosa is a species of tephritid or fruit flies in the genus Trypanaresta of the family Tephritidae.

== Distribution ==
Chile, Argentina.
