= Dilatitibialis carmen =

Scientific classification
- Kingdom: Animalia
- Phylum: Arthropoda
- Clade: Pancrustacea
- Class: Insecta
- Order: Coleoptera
- Suborder: Polyphaga
- Infraorder: Cucujiformia
- Family: Coccinellidae
- Genus: Dilatitibialis
- Species: D. carmen

Binomial name
- Dilatitibialis carmen Canepari & Gordon, 2013

Species of beetle

Dilatitibialis carmen is a species of beetle of the family Coccinellidae. It is found in Venezuela.

== Description ==
Adults reach a length of about 2.5–2.6 mm. They have a yellow body. The pronotum has a large light brown spot. The elytron has three large light brown spots and a brown apical margin.
