= Dilatitibialis scenica =

Scientific classification
- Kingdom: Animalia
- Phylum: Arthropoda
- Clade: Pancrustacea
- Class: Insecta
- Order: Coleoptera
- Suborder: Polyphaga
- Infraorder: Cucujiformia
- Family: Coccinellidae
- Genus: Dilatitibialis
- Species: D. scenica

Binomial name
- Dilatitibialis scenica (Mulsant, 1850)

Synonyms
- Cleothera scenica Mulsant, 1850; Cleothera retigera Mulsant, 1850

Species of beetle

Dilatitibialis scenica is a species of beetle of the family Coccinellidae. It is found in Colombia.

== Description ==
Adults reach a length of about 2.4–3.0 mm. They have a brown body. The pronotum is yellow a spot deeply emarginate medially with an anchor shaped yellow area. The elytron has eight small yellow spots.
