= Dilatitibialis ethel =

Scientific classification
- Kingdom: Animalia
- Phylum: Arthropoda
- Clade: Pancrustacea
- Class: Insecta
- Order: Coleoptera
- Suborder: Polyphaga
- Infraorder: Cucujiformia
- Family: Coccinellidae
- Genus: Dilatitibialis
- Species: D. ethel

Binomial name
- Dilatitibialis ethel Canepari & Gordon, 2013

Species of beetle

Dilatitibialis ethel is a species of beetle of the Coccinellidae family. It is found in Ecuador.

== Description ==
Adults reach a length of about 3.3-3.4 mm. They have a black body and yellow head. The pronotum is yellow with a small black vitta. The elytron has one wide yellow median vitta and a yellow lateral border.
