= Dilatitibialis silvani =

Scientific classification
- Kingdom: Animalia
- Phylum: Arthropoda
- Clade: Pancrustacea
- Class: Insecta
- Order: Coleoptera
- Suborder: Polyphaga
- Infraorder: Cucujiformia
- Family: Coccinellidae
- Genus: Dilatitibialis
- Species: D. silvani

Binomial name
- Dilatitibialis silvani (Crotch, 1874)

Synonyms
- Hyperaspis silvani Crotch, 1874

Species of beetle

Dilatitibialis silvani is a species of beetle of the family Coccinellidae. It is found in Brazil.

== Description ==
Adults reach a length of about 2.0-2.8 mm. They have a yellow body. The pronotum has a dark brown marking. Each elytron has four dark brown spots.
