= Dilatitibialis dilatata =

Scientific classification
- Kingdom: Animalia
- Phylum: Arthropoda
- Clade: Pancrustacea
- Class: Insecta
- Order: Coleoptera
- Suborder: Polyphaga
- Infraorder: Cucujiformia
- Family: Coccinellidae
- Genus: Dilatitibialis
- Species: D. dilatata

Binomial name
- Dilatitibialis dilatata (Crotch, 1874)

Synonyms
- Hyperaspis dilatata Crotch, 1874

Species of beetle

Dilatitibialis dilatata is a species of beetle of the family Coccinellidae. It is found in Brazil.

== Description ==
Adults reach a length of about 3.8–4.4 mm. They have a yellow body. The pronotum has a faint M-shaped darker yellow marking. The elytron is reddish yellow with a small triangular spot.
