= Dilatitibialis tina =

Scientific classification
- Kingdom: Animalia
- Phylum: Arthropoda
- Clade: Pancrustacea
- Class: Insecta
- Order: Coleoptera
- Suborder: Polyphaga
- Infraorder: Cucujiformia
- Family: Coccinellidae
- Genus: Dilatitibialis
- Species: D. tina

Binomial name
- Dilatitibialis tina Canepari & Gordon, 2013

Species of beetle

Dilatitibialis tina is a species of beetle of the family Coccinellidae. It is found in Brazil.

== Description ==
Adults reach a length of about 2.4–2.7 mm. They have a dark brown body and yellow head. The pronotum is yellow, with the basal margin and two spots dark brown. The elytron has five large yellow spots.
