= Dilatitibialis semicincta =

Scientific classification
- Kingdom: Animalia
- Phylum: Arthropoda
- Clade: Pancrustacea
- Class: Insecta
- Order: Coleoptera
- Suborder: Polyphaga
- Infraorder: Cucujiformia
- Family: Coccinellidae
- Genus: Dilatitibialis
- Species: D. semicincta

Binomial name
- Dilatitibialis semicincta (Weise, 1899)

Synonyms
- Cleothera semicincta Weise, 1899; Cleothera semicincta var. humeralis Weise 1899; Cleothera semicincta var. limbata Weise 1899; Cleothera staudingeri Weise, 1901

Species of beetle

Dilatitibialis semicincta is a species of beetle of the family Coccinellidae. It is found in Bolivia and Peru.

== Description ==
Adults reach a length of about 3–4 mm. They have a yellow body. The pronotum has a large dark brown marking. Most of the elytron is bordered with a dark brown ring.
