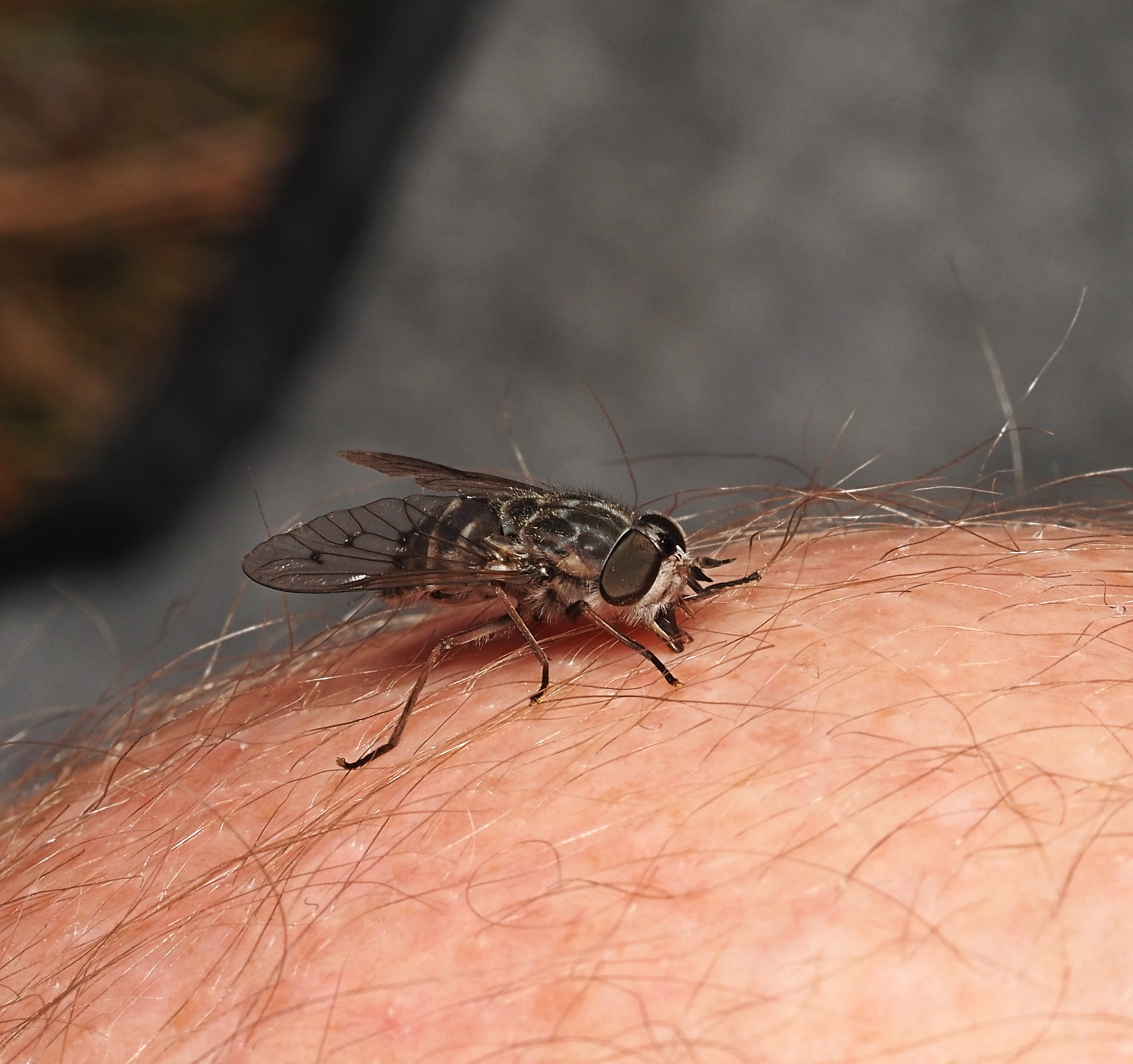

Scientific classification
- Kingdom: Animalia
- Phylum: Arthropoda
- Clade: Pancrustacea
- Class: Insecta
- Order: Diptera
- Family: Tabanidae
- Genus: Dasybasis
- Species: D. gentilis

Binomial name
- Dasybasis gentilis Erichson, 1842

Synonyms
- Tabanus gentilis Erichson, 1842; Tabanus imminutus Hardy, 1948

= Dasybasis gentilis =

Species of deer fly

Dasybasis gentilis is a deer fly in the family Tabanidae.

== Distribution ==
Australia
