= Dilatitibialis poortmanni =

Scientific classification
- Kingdom: Animalia
- Phylum: Arthropoda
- Clade: Pancrustacea
- Class: Insecta
- Order: Coleoptera
- Suborder: Polyphaga
- Infraorder: Cucujiformia
- Family: Coccinellidae
- Genus: Dilatitibialis
- Species: D. poortmanni

Binomial name
- Dilatitibialis poortmanni (Mulsant, 1850)

Synonyms
- Cleothera poortmanni Mulsant, 1850

Species of beetle

Dilatitibialis poortmanni is a species of beetle of the family Coccinellidae. It is found in Brazil.

== Description ==
Adults reach a length of about 2.6–3.4 mm. They have a yellow body. The pronotum has a large dark brown marking and two small brown spots. The sutural, lateral and apical margins of the elytron have a brown border and there are four large brown spots.
