= Dilatitibialis crystal =

Scientific classification
- Kingdom: Animalia
- Phylum: Arthropoda
- Clade: Pancrustacea
- Class: Insecta
- Order: Coleoptera
- Suborder: Polyphaga
- Infraorder: Cucujiformia
- Family: Coccinellidae
- Genus: Dilatitibialis
- Species: D. crystal

Binomial name
- Dilatitibialis crystal Canepari & Gordon, 2013

Species of beetle

Dilatitibialis crystal is a species of beetle of the family Coccinellidae. It is found in Colombia.

== Description ==
Adults reach a length of about 2.4 mm. They have a yellow body. The pronotum has a small light brown marking and two small pale brown spots. The elytron has four light brown spots.
