= Dilatitibialis dawn =

Scientific classification
- Kingdom: Animalia
- Phylum: Arthropoda
- Clade: Pancrustacea
- Class: Insecta
- Order: Coleoptera
- Suborder: Polyphaga
- Infraorder: Cucujiformia
- Family: Coccinellidae
- Genus: Dilatitibialis
- Species: D. dawn

Binomial name
- Dilatitibialis dawn Canepari & Gordon, 2013

Species of beetle

Dilatitibialis dawn is a species of beetle of the family Coccinellidae. It is found in Brazil.

== Description ==
Adults reach a length of about 2.0-2.4 mm. They have a dark brown body and yellow head. The lateral one-fifth and apical one-third of the pronotum are yellow. The elytron has five large yellow spots.
