= Dilatitibialis cognata =

Scientific classification
- Kingdom: Animalia
- Phylum: Arthropoda
- Clade: Pancrustacea
- Class: Insecta
- Order: Coleoptera
- Suborder: Polyphaga
- Infraorder: Cucujiformia
- Family: Coccinellidae
- Genus: Dilatitibialis
- Species: D. cognata

Binomial name
- Dilatitibialis cognata (Mulsant, 1850)

Synonyms
- Cleothera cognata Mulsant, 1850

Species of beetle

Dilatitibialis cognata is a species of beetle of the family Coccinellidae. It is found in Brazil.

== Description ==
Adults reach a length of about 4 mm. They have a bright orange body, but the basal half of the pronotum is black. The elytron has black lateral and apical borders and a black vitta.
