= Dilatitibialis rita =

Scientific classification
- Kingdom: Animalia
- Phylum: Arthropoda
- Clade: Pancrustacea
- Class: Insecta
- Order: Coleoptera
- Suborder: Polyphaga
- Infraorder: Cucujiformia
- Family: Coccinellidae
- Genus: Dilatitibialis
- Species: D. rita

Binomial name
- Dilatitibialis rita Canepari & Gordon, 2013

Species of beetle

Dilatitibialis rita is a species of beetle of the family Coccinellidae. It is found in Brazil.

== Description ==
Adults reach a length of about 2 mm. They have a black body. The anterolateral angle and the anterior one-seventh of the pronotum are yellow. The elytron has three small yellow spots.
