= Dilatitibialis josephine =

Scientific classification
- Kingdom: Animalia
- Phylum: Arthropoda
- Clade: Pancrustacea
- Class: Insecta
- Order: Coleoptera
- Suborder: Polyphaga
- Infraorder: Cucujiformia
- Family: Coccinellidae
- Genus: Dilatitibialis
- Species: D. josephine

Binomial name
- Dilatitibialis josephine Canepari & Gordon, 2013

Species of beetle

Dilatitibialis josephine is a species of beetle of the family Coccinellidae. It is found in Bolivia.

== Description ==
Adults reach a length of about 2.8 mm. They have a black body, but the pronotum is yellow with a large black marking. The elytron has five large yellow spots.
