= Trypanaresta delicatella =

Scientific classification
- Kingdom: Animalia
- Phylum: Arthropoda
- Class: Insecta
- Order: Diptera
- Family: Tephritidae
- Subfamily: Tephritinae
- Tribe: Tephritini
- Genus: Trypanaresta
- Species: T. delicatella

Binomial name
- Trypanaresta delicatella (Blanchard, 1854)

Synonyms
- Acinia delicatella Blanchard, 1854; Tephritis marisolae Frías, 1988; Acinia delicatetla Aczél, 1950; Trypanea aorista Hendel, 1914; Trypanea tripuncta Malloch, 1933

Species of fly

Trypanaresta delicatella is a species of tephritid or fruit flies in the genus Trypanaresta of the family Tephritidae.

== Distribution ==
Chile, Argentina.
