= Dilatitibialis marjorie =

Scientific classification
- Kingdom: Animalia
- Phylum: Arthropoda
- Clade: Pancrustacea
- Class: Insecta
- Order: Coleoptera
- Suborder: Polyphaga
- Infraorder: Cucujiformia
- Family: Coccinellidae
- Genus: Dilatitibialis
- Species: D. marjorie

Binomial name
- Dilatitibialis marjorie Canepari & Gordon, 2013

Species of beetle

Dilatitibialis marjorie is a species of beetle of the family Coccinellidae. It is found in Brazil.

== Description ==
Adults reach a length of about 3 mm. They have a yellow body, the head with a brown marking. The pronotum has four large dark brown markings. The elytron has five brown vittae.
