= Dilatitibialis tropicalis =

Scientific classification
- Kingdom: Animalia
- Phylum: Arthropoda
- Clade: Pancrustacea
- Class: Insecta
- Order: Coleoptera
- Suborder: Polyphaga
- Infraorder: Cucujiformia
- Family: Coccinellidae
- Genus: Dilatitibialis
- Species: D. tropicalis

Binomial name
- Dilatitibialis tropicalis (Mulsant, 1850)

Synonyms
- Cleothera tropicalis Mulsant, 1850

Species of beetle

Dilatitibialis tropicalis is a species of beetle of the family Coccinellidae. It is found in Brazil.

== Description ==
Adults reach a length of about 3.1 mm. They have a yellow body. The pronotum has a large dark brown marking. The elytron is dark brown with five yellow spots.
