= Dasybasis appendiculata =

Scientific classification
- Kingdom: Animalia
- Phylum: Arthropoda
- Clade: Pancrustacea
- Class: Insecta
- Order: Diptera
- Family: Tabanidae
- Subfamily: Tabaninae
- Tribe: Diachlorini
- Genus: Dasybasis
- Species: D. appendiculata

Binomial name
- Dasybasis appendiculata Macquart, 1847

Species of fly

Dasybasis appendiculata is a species of deer fly in the family Tabanidae.

== Distribution ==
Australia.
