= Dilatitibialis guttipennis =

Scientific classification
- Kingdom: Animalia
- Phylum: Arthropoda
- Clade: Pancrustacea
- Class: Insecta
- Order: Coleoptera
- Suborder: Polyphaga
- Infraorder: Cucujiformia
- Family: Coccinellidae
- Genus: Dilatitibialis
- Species: D. guttipennis

Binomial name
- Dilatitibialis guttipennis (Weise, 1922)

Synonyms
- Hinda guttipennis Mulsant, 1850

Species of beetle

Dilatitibialis guttipennis is a species of beetle of the family Coccinellidae. It is found in Argentina, Brazil, Guyana and Trinidad.

== Description ==
Adults reach a length of about 2.2–3.3 mm. They have a brown body and yellow head. The pronotum has a black marking. The elytron has five yellow spots.
