= Dilatitibialis suzannae =

Scientific classification
- Kingdom: Animalia
- Phylum: Arthropoda
- Clade: Pancrustacea
- Class: Insecta
- Order: Coleoptera
- Suborder: Polyphaga
- Infraorder: Cucujiformia
- Family: Coccinellidae
- Genus: Dilatitibialis
- Species: D. suzannae

Binomial name
- Dilatitibialis suzannae (Crotch, 1874)

Synonyms
- Hyperaspis suzannae Crotch, 1874; Hyperaspis pulcherrima Mader, 1954

Species of beetle

Dilatitibialis suzannae is a species of beetle of the family Coccinellidae. It is found in Trinidad and Venezuela.

== Description ==
Adults reach a length of about 1.6–3.0 mm. They have a yellow body. The pronotum has a dark brown band and two triangular light brown spots. The elytron has a light brown border and two large black spots.
