= Trypanaresta thomsoni =

Scientific classification
- Kingdom: Animalia
- Phylum: Arthropoda
- Class: Insecta
- Order: Diptera
- Family: Tephritidae
- Subfamily: Tephritinae
- Tribe: Tephritini
- Genus: Trypanaresta
- Species: T. thomsoni

Binomial name
- Trypanaresta thomsoni (Hendel, 1914)

Synonyms
- Trypanea thomsoni Hendel, 1914; Trypeta plagiata Thomson, 1869

Species of fly

Trypanaresta thomsoni is a species of tephritid or fruit flies in the genus Trypanaresta of the family Tephritidae.

== Distribution ==
Bolivia, Argentina.
