= Dilatitibialis =

Scientific classification
- Kingdom: Animalia
- Phylum: Arthropoda
- Clade: Pancrustacea
- Class: Insecta
- Order: Coleoptera
- Suborder: Polyphaga
- Infraorder: Cucujiformia
- Family: Coccinellidae
- Subfamily: Coccinellinae
- Tribe: Brachiacanthini
- Genus: Dilatitibialis; Duverger, 2002

Genus of beetles

Dilatitibialis is a genus of lady beetles in the family Coccinellidae.

== Species ==
- semicincta group
  - Dilatitibialis semicincta (Weise, 1900)
  - Dilatitibialis lois Canepari & Gordon, 2013
  - Dilatitibialis tina Canepari & Gordon, 2013
  - Dilatitibialis phyllis Canepari & Gordon, 2013
  - Dilatitibialis cindy Canepari & Gordon, 2013
  - Dilatitibialis norma Canepari & Gordon, 2013
  - Dilatitibialis hybridula (Crotch, 1874)
  - Dilatitibialis glyphica (Mulsant, 1850)
  - Dilatitibialis paula Canepari & Gordon, 2013
- mulsanti group
  - Dilatitibialis mulsanti (Kirsch, 1876)
  - Dilatitibialis poortmanni (Mulsant, 1850)
  - Dilatitibialis diana Canepari & Gordon, 2013
  - Dilatitibialis suzannae (Crotch, 1874)
  - Dilatitibialis carolinae (Crotch, 1874)
  - Dilatitibialis annie Canepari & Gordon, 2013
  - Dilatitibialis gravabilis (Brèthes, 1925)
  - Dilatitibialis lillian Canepari & Gordon, 2013
  - Dilatitibialis tropicalis (Mulsant, 1850)
  - Dilatitibialis emily Canepari & Gordon, 2013
  - Dilatitibialis robin Canepari & Gordon, 2013
  - Dilatitibialis peggy Canepari & Gordon, 2013
  - Dilatitibialis crystal Canepari & Gordon, 2013
  - Dilatitibialis silvani (Crotch, 1874)
  - Dilatitibialis gladys Canepari & Gordon, 2013
  - Dilatitibialis rita Canepari & Gordon, 2013
  - Dilatitibialis dawn Canepari & Gordon, 2013
  - Dilatitibialis scenica (Mulsant, 1850)
  - Dilatitibialis connie Canepari & Gordon, 2013
  - Dilatitibialis florence Canepari & Gordon, 2013
  - Dilatitibialis tracy Canepari & Gordon, 2013
  - Dilatitibialis edna Canepari & Gordon, 2013
  - Dilatitibialis tiffany Canepari & Gordon, 2013
  - Dilatitibialis carmen Canepari & Gordon, 2013
  - Dilatitibialis rosa Canepari & Gordon, 2013
  - Dilatitibialis grace Canepari & Gordon, 2013
  - Dilatitibialis oseryi (Mulsant, 1850)
  - Dilatitibialis jucunda (Mulsant, 1850)
  - Dilatitibialis fallax Canepari & Gordon, 2013
  - Dilatitibialis wendy Canepari & Gordon, 2013
  - Dilatitibialis dilatata (Crotch, 1874)
  - Dilatitibialis edith Canepari & Gordon, 2013
  - Dilatitibialis kim Canepari & Gordon, 2013
  - Dilatitibialis sherry Canepari & Gordon, 2013
  - Dilatitibialis cognata (Mulsant, 1850)
  - Dilatitibialis sylvia Canepari & Gordon, 2013
  - Dilatitibialis luteola (Mulsant, 1850)
  - Dilatitibialis florifera (Vogel, 1865)
  - Dilatitibialis fuscomaculata (Mulsant, 1850)
  - Dilatitibialis guttipennis (Weise, 1922)
  - Dilatitibialis josephine Canepari & Gordon, 2013
- thelma group
  - Dilatitibialis thelma Canepari & Gordon, 2013
  - Dilatitibialis shannon Canepari & Gordon, 2013
  - Dilatitibialis sheila Canepari & Gordon, 2013
  - Dilatitibialis ethel Canepari & Gordon, 2013
  - Dilatitibialis ellen Canepari & Gordon, 2013
- ceciliae group
  - Dilatitibialis ceciliae (Crotch, 1874)
  - Dilatitibialis elaine Canepari & Gordon, 2013
- group unassigned
  - Dilatitibialis cruciferae (Mulsant, 1850)
  - Dilatitibialis gaynoni (Mulsant, 1850)
  - Dilatitibialis laterinotata (Brèthes, 1925)
  - Dilatitibialis manaus González & Větrovec, 2021
  - Dilatitibialis marini González, 2015
  - Dilatitibialis marjorie Canepari & Gordon, 2013
