= Dilatitibialis phyllis =

Scientific classification
- Kingdom: Animalia
- Phylum: Arthropoda
- Clade: Pancrustacea
- Class: Insecta
- Order: Coleoptera
- Suborder: Polyphaga
- Infraorder: Cucujiformia
- Family: Coccinellidae
- Genus: Dilatitibialis
- Species: D. phyllis

Binomial name
- Dilatitibialis phyllis Canepari & Gordon, 2013

Species of beetle

Dilatitibialis phyllis is a species of beetle of the family Coccinellidae. It is found in Ecuador.

== Description ==
Adults reach a length of about 2.6–3.4 mm. They have a yellow body. The pronotum has a black basal border and two pale brown spots. The elytron has two large black stripes.

== Etymology ==
This species is named for Phyllis, a niece of Claudio Canepari, one of the authors.
