= Dilatitibialis sheila =

Scientific classification
- Kingdom: Animalia
- Phylum: Arthropoda
- Clade: Pancrustacea
- Class: Insecta
- Order: Coleoptera
- Suborder: Polyphaga
- Infraorder: Cucujiformia
- Family: Coccinellidae
- Genus: Dilatitibialis
- Species: D. sheila

Binomial name
- Dilatitibialis sheila Canepari & Gordon, 2013

Species of beetle

Dilatitibialis sheila is a species of beetle of the family Coccinellidae. It is found in Colombia.

== Description ==
Adults reach a length of about 3 mm. They have a black body and yellow head. The apical one-third and lateral one-third of the pronotum are yellow and there is a black marking. The elytron has five large yellow spots.
