= Dilatitibialis robin =

Scientific classification
- Kingdom: Animalia
- Phylum: Arthropoda
- Clade: Pancrustacea
- Class: Insecta
- Order: Coleoptera
- Suborder: Polyphaga
- Infraorder: Cucujiformia
- Family: Coccinellidae
- Genus: Dilatitibialis
- Species: D. robin

Binomial name
- Dilatitibialis robin Canepari & Gordon, 2013

Species of beetle

Dilatitibialis robin is a species of beetle of the family Coccinellidae. It is found in Venezuela.

== Description ==
Adults reach a length of about 2 mm. They have a black body. The pronotum has a large yellow rectangular anterolateral angle and the median one-fifth of the apex is yellow. The elytron has five large yellow spots.
