= Dilatitibialis cindy =

Scientific classification
- Kingdom: Animalia
- Phylum: Arthropoda
- Clade: Pancrustacea
- Class: Insecta
- Order: Coleoptera
- Suborder: Polyphaga
- Infraorder: Cucujiformia
- Family: Coccinellidae
- Genus: Dilatitibialis
- Species: D. cindy

Binomial name
- Dilatitibialis cindy Canepari & Gordon, 2013

Species of beetle

Dilatitibialis cindy is a species of beetle of the family Coccinellidae. It is found in Brazil.

== Description ==
Adults reach a length of about 3.5 mm. They have a yellow body. The pronotum has a black marking. The elytron has two large black sutural vitta and a large black lateral vitta extended from base across humeral callus.
