= Dilatitibialis tiffany =

Scientific classification
- Kingdom: Animalia
- Phylum: Arthropoda
- Clade: Pancrustacea
- Class: Insecta
- Order: Coleoptera
- Suborder: Polyphaga
- Infraorder: Cucujiformia
- Family: Coccinellidae
- Genus: Dilatitibialis
- Species: D. tiffany

Binomial name
- Dilatitibialis tiffany Canepari & Gordon, 2013

Species of beetle

Dilatitibialis tiffany is a species of beetle of the family Coccinellidae. It is found in Argentina.

== Description ==
Adults reach a length of about 2.8 mm. They have a yellow body. The pronotum has two large dark brown spots. The elytron has three large dark brown spots.
