= Dilatitibialis marini =

Scientific classification
- Kingdom: Animalia
- Phylum: Arthropoda
- Clade: Pancrustacea
- Class: Insecta
- Order: Coleoptera
- Suborder: Polyphaga
- Infraorder: Cucujiformia
- Family: Coccinellidae
- Genus: Dilatitibialis
- Species: D. marini

Binomial name
- Dilatitibialis marini González, 2015

Species of beetle

Dilatitibialis marini is a species of beetle of the family Coccinellidae. It is found in Ecuador.

== Description ==
Adults reach a length of about 2.9 mm. Adults are black with a yellow head. There are two oval spots on the pronotum and three yellow spots on the elytron.
