= Dilatitibialis manaus =

Scientific classification
- Kingdom: Animalia
- Phylum: Arthropoda
- Clade: Pancrustacea
- Class: Insecta
- Order: Coleoptera
- Suborder: Polyphaga
- Infraorder: Cucujiformia
- Family: Coccinellidae
- Genus: Dilatitibialis
- Species: D. manaus

Binomial name
- Dilatitibialis manaus González & Větrovec, 2021

Species of beetle

Dilatitibialis manaus is a species of beetle of the family Coccinellidae. It is found in Brazil (Amazonas).

== Description ==
Adults reach a length of about 2.5 mm (0.098 in). The head and antennae are yellow and the pronotum is yellow with four brown spots and a basal stripe. The scutellum is brown with a yellow spot and the elytra are yellow with a brown stripe, a brown band at the base and a brown lateral border, as well as four spots on the disc. The ventral surface is mostly yellow. The legs are yellow. The pubescence is yellowish white.

== Etymology ==
The species is named after the city of Manaus, Brazil, where the holotype was collected.
