= Dilatitibialis luteola =

Scientific classification
- Kingdom: Animalia
- Phylum: Arthropoda
- Clade: Pancrustacea
- Class: Insecta
- Order: Coleoptera
- Suborder: Polyphaga
- Infraorder: Cucujiformia
- Family: Coccinellidae
- Genus: Dilatitibialis
- Species: D. luteola

Binomial name
- Dilatitibialis luteola (Mulsant, 1850)

Synonyms
- Cleothera luteola Mulsant, 1850

Species of beetle

Dilatitibialis luteola is a species of beetle of the family Coccinellidae. It is found in Costa Rica, Panama, Brazil, Colombia, Ecuador, Peru and Venezuela.

== Description ==
Adults reach a length of about 2–3 mm. They have a yellow body. The pronotum has a faint darker yellow M-shaped marking. The elytron is darker yellow, except for the humeral angle with a small triangular yellow spot.
