= Trypanaresta plagiata =

Scientific classification
- Kingdom: Animalia
- Phylum: Arthropoda
- Class: Insecta
- Order: Diptera
- Family: Tephritidae
- Subfamily: Tephritinae
- Tribe: Tephritini
- Genus: Trypanaresta
- Species: T. plagiata

Binomial name
- Trypanaresta plagiata (Blanchard, 1854)

Synonyms
- Acinia plagiata Blanchard, 1854

Species of fly

Trypanaresta plagiata is a species of tephritid or fruit flies in the genus Trypanaresta of the family Tephritidae.

== Distribution ==
The species is found in Chile.
