= Dilatitibialis paula =

Scientific classification
- Kingdom: Animalia
- Phylum: Arthropoda
- Clade: Pancrustacea
- Class: Insecta
- Order: Coleoptera
- Suborder: Polyphaga
- Infraorder: Cucujiformia
- Family: Coccinellidae
- Genus: Dilatitibialis
- Species: D. paula

Binomial name
- Dilatitibialis paula Canepari & Gordon, 2013

Species of beetle

Dilatitibialis paula is a species of beetle of the family Coccinellidae. It is found in Venezuela.

== Description ==
Adults reach a length of about 3.2 mm. They have a yellow body, although the head has a black area. The pronotum has a dark brown border and there is are two small brown spots. The elytron has five small brown spots.
