= Dilatitibialis lois =

Scientific classification
- Kingdom: Animalia
- Phylum: Arthropoda
- Clade: Pancrustacea
- Class: Insecta
- Order: Coleoptera
- Suborder: Polyphaga
- Infraorder: Cucujiformia
- Family: Coccinellidae
- Genus: Dilatitibialis
- Species: D. lois

Binomial name
- Dilatitibialis lois Canepari & Gordon, 2013

Species of beetle

Dilatitibialis lois is a species of beetle of the family Coccinellidae. It is found in Brazil.

== Description ==
Adults reach a length of about 2.8–3.5 mm. They have a black body and yellow head. The lateral one-third and apical one-sixth of the pronotum is yellow. The elytron is entirely black.
