= Dilatitibialis edith =

Scientific classification
- Kingdom: Animalia
- Phylum: Arthropoda
- Clade: Pancrustacea
- Class: Insecta
- Order: Coleoptera
- Suborder: Polyphaga
- Infraorder: Cucujiformia
- Family: Coccinellidae
- Genus: Dilatitibialis
- Species: D. edith

Binomial name
- Dilatitibialis edith Canepari & Gordon, 2013

Species of beetle

Dilatitibialis edith is a species of beetle of the family Coccinellidae. It is found in Peru.

== Description ==
Adults reach a length of about 3.3 mm. They have a yellow body. The pronotum has a small black marking. The scutellum and suture of the elytron are bordered with black vitta and there is a large dark brown marking.
