= Dilatitibialis connie =

Scientific classification
- Kingdom: Animalia
- Phylum: Arthropoda
- Clade: Pancrustacea
- Class: Insecta
- Order: Coleoptera
- Suborder: Polyphaga
- Infraorder: Cucujiformia
- Family: Coccinellidae
- Genus: Dilatitibialis
- Species: D. connie

Binomial name
- Dilatitibialis connie Canepari & Gordon, 2013

Species of beetle

Dilatitibialis connie is a species of beetle of the family Coccinellidae. It is found in Peru and Brazil.

== Description ==
Adults reach a length of about 2.4–2.6 mm. They have a dark brown body and a yellow head. The pronotum has a dark brown marking. The elytron has five small yellow spots.
