= Trypanaresta flava =

Scientific classification
- Kingdom: Animalia
- Phylum: Arthropoda
- Class: Insecta
- Order: Diptera
- Family: Tephritidae
- Subfamily: Tephritinae
- Tribe: Tephritini
- Genus: Trypanaresta
- Species: T. flava

Binomial name
- Trypanaresta flava (Adams, 1904)

Synonyms
- Urellia flava Adams, 1904; Euarestoides arnaudi Foote, 1958 -

Species of fly

Trypanaresta flava is a species of tephritid or fruit flies in the genus Trypanaresta of the family Tephritidae.

== Distribution ==
United States, Costa Rica.
