= Hyperaspis brethesi =

Scientific classification
- Kingdom: Animalia
- Phylum: Arthropoda
- Clade: Pancrustacea
- Class: Insecta
- Order: Coleoptera
- Suborder: Polyphaga
- Infraorder: Cucujiformia
- Family: Coccinellidae
- Genus: Hyperaspis
- Species: H. brethesi

Binomial name
- Hyperaspis brethesi Gordon & Canepari, 2008

Species of beetle

Hyperaspis brethesi is a species of beetle of the family Coccinellidae. It is found in Argentina.

== Description ==
Adults reach a length of about 2.1–2.4 mm. They have a yellow body. The median one-third of the pronotum is dark brown with a yellow eyelike spot on each side of the middle. The elytron is yellow, speckled with brown dots.

== Etymology ==
The species is named in honour of Juan Bréthes, who contributed much to the classification of South American Coccinellidae.
