= Dilatitibialis jucunda =

Scientific classification
- Kingdom: Animalia
- Phylum: Arthropoda
- Clade: Pancrustacea
- Class: Insecta
- Order: Coleoptera
- Suborder: Polyphaga
- Infraorder: Cucujiformia
- Family: Coccinellidae
- Genus: Dilatitibialis
- Species: D. jucunda

Binomial name
- Dilatitibialis jucunda (Mulsant, 1850)

Synonyms
- Cleothera jucunda Mulsant, 1850

Species of beetle

Dilatitibialis jucunda is a species of beetle of the family Coccinellidae. It is found in Colombia.

== Description ==
Adults reach a length of about 3.2 mm. They have a black body and yellow head. The pronotum is yellow with a black spot. The elytron is black with five yellow spots.
