= Juan Brèthes =

Argentine scientist (1871–1928)

- Born: 24 February 1871; Saint-Sever, Landes, France
- Died: 2 July 1928 (aged 57); Buenos Aires, Argentina
- Citizenship: French citizen/subject
- Known for: Primer Entomólogo del Museo Nacional; Socio Fundador de la Sociedad Entomológica Argentina; Socio Fundador de la Asociación Ornitológica del Plata, Colaborador de Florentino Ameghino
- Scientific career
- Workplaces: Museo Nacional de Ciencias; Sociedad Rural; Dirección General de Agricultura y Defensa Agrícola
- Author abbrev. (botany): Brethes
- Author abbrev. (zoology): Brèthes

Juan (Jean) Brèthes, also known as Frère Judulien Marie (24 February 1871 in Saint-Sever, Landes – 2 July 1928 in Buenos Aires) was an Argentine scientist, naturalist, entomologist, ornithologist, zoologist and geologist. He was the first entomologist of the National Museum, today known as the Argentine Museum of Natural Sciences. He was a collaborator of Florentino Ameghino, and translated several of his works into French. He systematized a number of Latin American insect species. He contributed to agricultural pest management before the development of modern insecticides.

== His arrival in Buenos Aires ==
Juan Brèthes was born on February 24, 1871 in Saint Sever sur l'Adour (Landes) in southwestern France, to Jean Brèthes and Claire Tauzin. He was their third son. His father worked as a planter, and from his childhood he became familiar with the insects that caused the gills of the wood.

At an early age he joined the Institute of the Brothers of the Christian Schools, also known as Brothers de La Salle. With them he learned Latin and acquired an education related to his future activities.

In 1890, at the age of nineteen, he arrived in Buenos Aires as a member of a contingent of Brothers who had the mission of serving as a teacher and educator in different environments.

Between 1892 and 1899 he worked as a teacher of the preparatory classes to enter the baccalaureate of the Colegio del Salvador. At the beginning of the 20th century he joined the faculty of the recently completed La Salle School.

One of his first activities was to create the Museum of Natural Sciences of the School. With his own contributions and from the students, he gathered pieces, achieving the value of the collection and laying the foundations for the realization of a museum that continues to this day. He directed it until 1907, his successor being Brother Esteban Fournier.

== His first steps ==
Beginning in 1897, Brother Judulien went every Thursday to the National Museum of Natural Sciences, requesting help to classify the insects he had kept in a box shaped like a book. In those years, he donated insects and arachnids to the National Museum, which he collected in his research. The contributions of Brèthes can be seen in the "Notes Fitoteratológicas", published by Ángel Gallardo in 1899.

== Collaboration with Jean H. Fabre ==
Brèthes collaborated with Jean H. Fabre, a naturalist, humanist and entomologist, as well as a personal friend of Charles Darwin, despite his conviction that he was opposed to the theory of evolution. Their collaboration began at the end of the 19th century, when Fabre asked for his help to study the South American beetles. In his most recognized work, "Souvenirs Entomologiques", Fabre gave a recognition to Brèthes.

== Collaboration with Florentino Ameghino ==
In 1902 Florentino Ameghino agreed to the direction of the National Museum of Sciences in Argentina. In recognition of the work developed by Brèthes, Ameghino offered Brèthes the opportunity to take charge of the entomological section, thus making Brèthes the first official entomologist of the museum (previously the task was in charge of the same Carlos Berg, director of the institution). Brèthes served in this position for 26 years, until the time of his death.

Ameghino reported "... as far as insects are concerned, a few days ago the manager of the entomological section, Mr. Brèthes, took possession of his job. Now he is taking knowledge of the collection, which is in a state that you could not imagine ..."

During the direction of Ameghino the Museum published a number of important and foundational works. Brèthes assisted on a number of these publications. Over the years, remembering those times he would write: "... Ameghino made known his "Recherches de Morphologie Phylogénétique sur les molaires supérieures des Ongulés", a work that occupies the whole volume referred to. It was a work that saw the light in ten months While the first notebooks were being printed (I was in charge of the drawings illustrating the work), the manuscript was followed and the corrections were accompanied: thus with a parallel and multiple work, Ameghino carried out his fruitful and tireless task ...". Brèthes was also in charge of making the microscopic preparations and of translating the works into French, among them a work of capital importance: "My Creed".

Brèthes' ties with Ameghino became very close. "... The ten years that I have lived in daily contact with Florentino Ameghino, from 1902 to 1911 when he died, allowed me to appreciate the intimate depths of this great man. And to express my thought in one word, I will say that he was a superior man ..."

== Collaboration with Felix D'Herelle ==
At the beginning of the 20th century grasshoppers were devastating crops. Ángel Gallardo proposed to bring the specialist Félix d'Hérelle to Argentina so that he could direct the Bacteriological Section of the Entomological Institute and develop a locust parasite coccobacillus, however, the desired results were not obtained.

== Personal life ==
By 1902, he had definitively left his habits and his scientific activities were advancing steadily. His decision did not mean in any way a rupture or estrangement, the Order in which he professed did not imply the ecclesiastical vote, and Brèthes kept unchanged the principles and values that had led him to exercise the ministry. Therefore he continued practicing as a professor of Natural Sciences in the school of Salvador with his former Brothers.

However, it was difficult for the young scientist to take such an important step, says Dr. José Liebermann "... The beginning was hard for Bréthes; he was received as a public translator, and he had to give lessons and dedicate himself to various activities ... "

Around 1902 he met his later wife, Leontina Rossi Belgrano, an excellent draftsman and painter. The marriage took place in the Parish of Monserrat, on September 7, 1903. The family of Leontina became an important support for Brèthes who had no relatives in Argentina. In 1904 his first son was born: Juancito Julio Brèthes.

== Scientific Expeditions ==
=== Shipping from Brazil ===
In 1918, Dr. Antonio Ronna sent a batch of specimens he had found in the vicinity of San Pablo. In his honor Brèthes baptized one of the new species as Heteroscapus ronnai.

=== Campaigns in Peru ===
In the same year the first scientific university expedition was organized in Peru, organized by the wise Carlos Rospigliosi Vigil and in 1920 a second expedition with the Swedish aid and the participation of Otto Nordenskjöld . All the collected material was sent to Buenos Aires for its taxonomic classification. As a thank you Brèthes called Tanava rospigliosi to one of the found types.

=== Links with Chile ===
From the first years of the 20th century Brèthes had established a strong friendship with Carlos Porter, classifying the new species that he sent from the Blanco River (on the western slope of Aconcagua ). Throughout the years, Bréthes made more than fifty publications in the Chilean Magazine of Natural History that founded and directed Porte.

=== Exemplary of Paraguay ===
In 1910, Moisés Bertoni arrived in the country and had the opportunity to meet with Brèthes. The relationship continued for many years and, after the death of the Swiss scholar, through his son Arnold Winkelried Bertoni. On several occasions entomological material was sent for its classification and mutual tributes were made. So Bertoni called Minixi brethesi a species found by him and Bréthes corresponded with the Nortonia bertonii.

=== Australian Expedition ===
At the end of 1920, an Australian mission arrived in Argentina with the objective of finding natural enemies of the cacti that were plagues of agriculture in New South Wales . After contacting Brèthes, they toured La Rioja, Catamarca, Mendoza and Córdoba. Delivering the collected material to the authorities of the National Museum for classification and study.

=== Brother Apollinaire Marie of Colombia ===
In Bogotá, he carried out a task similar to that of Brèthes, Brother Apollinaire Marie (Nicolás Séiller) of the La Salle schools. He was therefore an old companion of the Franco-Argentine entomologist. Both scientists contacted about 1926. In the magazine Reason and Faith it was announced: "... Several hymenopterans from Colombia sent by Br. Apolinar María, from Bogotá, to Mr. Brèthes, from Buenos Aires, have given occasion to him to describe several species of the Braconid, Ichneumonid, Apid, Vespid, and a new genus of the latter ... "

=== The British Museum ===
Much of the collection of coccinellids collected by Charles Darwin on his expedition aboard the Beagle were sent by the British Museum to Brèthes for identification.

=== Entomological Institute of Berlin ===
Walther Hermann Richard Horn, director of the Entomological Institute of Berlin, requested the collaboration of Brèthes for the classification of the South American hymenoptera that were part of the collection of his Institute. As a result of this work, two articles published in 1927 were published in the journal Entomologische Mitteilungen. They were called "Hyménoptères Sud-Américains du Deutsches Entomologisches Institut".

== Acknowledgments in species ==
There are many species that have been names in honour of Juan Brèthes. A partial list is given below:

- Aceria brethesi (Lizer, 1917)
- Acanthoscurria chacoana (Brèthes, 1909)
- Aenasius brethesi De Santis, 1964
- Aleiodes brethesi (Shenefelt, 1975)
- Alloscirtetica brethesi (Jörgensen, 1912)
- Apanteles brethesi Porter, 1917
- Augochloropsis brethesi (Vachal, 1903)
- Balcarcia brethesi Blanchard, 1941
- Brachiacantha brethesi (Korschefsky)
- Centris brethesi Schrottky, 1902
- Ceropales brethesi Banks, 1947
- Chrysocharis brethesi Schauff & Salvo, 1993
- Coccophagus brethesi De Santis, 1967
- Colletes brethesi Jörgensen, 1912
- Conura brethesi (Blanchard, 1935)
- Culex (Culex) brethesi Dyar, 1919
- Dasybasis brethesi Coscaron & Philip, 1967
- Diapetimorpha brethesi Schrottky, 1902
- Diomus brethesi Gonzalez & Gordon, 2003
- Fillus brethesi Navas, 1919
- Gnomidolon brethesi Bruch, 1908
- Hemeroplanes brethesi Kohler, 1924)
- Halictus brethesi Vachal, J. (1903)
- Helorus brethesi Oglobin, 1928
- Heterospilus brethesi Marsh, 2013
- Hypodynerus brethesi Jörgensen, 1912
- Hyperaspis brethesi Gordon & Canepari, 2008
- Hypodynerus brethesi Jörgensen, 1912
- Minixi brethesi (Bertoni, 1927)
- Megachile brethesi Schrottky, 1909
- Montezumia brethesi Bertoni, 1918
- Mycetophila brethesi Schrottky, 1909
- Nectopsyche brethesi (Navas, 1920)
- Lepidomyia brethesi (Shannon, 1928)
- Litomastix brethesi Blanchard, 1936
- Pepsis brethesi Montet, 1921
- Podagritus brethesi Leclercq, 1951
- Psychidosmicra brethesi Blanchard, 1936
- Rhodnius brethesi (Matta, 1919)
- Tetralonia brethesi Jorgensen 1912
- Tolmerolestes brethesi Gemignani 1936
- Trypoxylon brethesi Gemignani 1936
- Zikanapis brethesi Compagnucci, 2006.

== Works ==
- Quelques notes sur plusieurs coprophages de Buenos Aires, Revista del Museo de La Plata, 1899.
- Los escarabajos de Buenos Aires, Folleto de 16 pp. y figs., Bs. Aires, 1900.
- Parisanopus, un nouveau genre de Staphylius, Comunicaciones del Museo Nacional de Buenos Aires, t. 1, pág. 215-219, 1900.
- El Bicho Moro. Estudio biológico sobre Epicauta adspersa Klug y medios de destruirla, B.A.G., 1(14), pág. 20-31, 1901.
- Notes biologiques sur trois hyménoptères de Buenos Aires, Revista del Museo de la Plata, t. 10, pág. 195-205, 1901.
- Métamorphoses de L´Uroplata (Heterispa) Costipennis, Anales del Museo Nacional, t. VIII, pág. 13-16, 1902.
- Contributions á l'étude des Hyménoptères de l´Amérique du Sud et spécialement de la République Argentine: Les Chrysidides, Anales del Museo Nacional, t. VIII, pág. 263-295, 1902.
- Les Pinophilinis Argentins (Coléoptères Staphylins), Anales del Museo Nacional, t. VIII, pág. 305-18, 1902.
- Sur quelques Nids de Vespides, Anales del Museo Nacional, t. VIII, pág. 413-18, 1902.
- Un nuevo Meteorus argentino (Hymenóptera, Braconidae), Anales del Museo Nacional, t. IX, pág. 53, 1903.
- Los Euménidos de las Repúblicas del Plata, Anales del Museo Nacional, t. IX, pág. 231, 1903.
- Contribución al estudio de los Véspidos sudamericanos y especialmente argentinos, Anales del Museo Nacional, t. IX, 1903.
- Un nuevo Anthidium de Patagonia, Anales del Museo Nacional, t. IX, pág. 351-353, 1903.
- Trimeria buyssoni, Un nuevo Masárido argentino, Anales del Museo Nacional, t. IX, pág. 371-374, 1903.
- Himenópteros nuevos o poco conocidos Parásitos del bicho de cesto (Oeceticus platensis Berg), Anales del Museo Nacional, t. XI, pág. 17-24, 1904.
- Insectos de Tucumán, Anales del Museo Nacional, t. XI, pág. 329-47, 1904.
- Biología del Dasyscelus normalis Brunn, Anales del Museo Nacional, XII, pág. 67-73, 1905.
- Descripción de un nuevo género y de una nueva especie de Clavicornio de Buenos Aires (Coleóptero), Anales de la Sociedad Científica Argentina, 59, pág. 76-79, 1905.
- Nuevos Euménidos argentinos, Anales del Museo Nacional, XII, pág. 21-39, 1906.
- Sarcophaga Caridei, una nueva mosca langosticida, Anales del Museo Nacional, t. XIII, pág. 297, 1906.
- Véspidos y Eumenídidos sudamericanos (nuevo suplemento), Anales del Museo Nacional, t. XIII, pág. 311, 1906.
- Himenópteros sudamericanos, Anales del Museo Nacional, t. XVI, pág. 1, 1907.
- Chlanidefera Culleni Una nueva mariposa argentina, Anales del Museo Nacional, t. XVI, pág. 45, 1907.
- Catálogo de los Dípteros de las repúblicas del Plata, Anales del Museo Nacional, t. XVI, pág. 277, 1907.
- El género Urellia (Díptera) en el Plata, Anales del Museo Nacional, t. XVI, pág. 367, 1907.
- Una nueva Urellia de Patagonia, Anales del Museo Nacional, t. XVI, pág. 471, 1907.
- Sobre tres Exorista (Dipt.) parásitas de la Palustra tennis Berg, Anales del Museo Nacional, t. XVI, pág. 473, 1907.
- A propósito de la Mosca langosticida, Boletín de Agricultura y Ganadería, VII, nº 112 y 115, 1907.
- Sobre algunas esfégides del grupo de Sphex Thoma, Anales del Museo Nacional, t. XVII, pág. 143, 1908.
- Sobre la Mastophera extraordinaria Holbg. y su nidificación, Anales del Museo Nacional, t. XVII, pág. 163-168, 1908.
- Dos nuevos Platypus (Col.) argentinos, Anales del Museo Nacional, t. XVII, pág. 225-227, 1908.
- Contribución preliminar para el conocimiento de los Pepsis, Anales del Museo Nacional, XVII, pág. 233-243, 1908.
- Masarygidae Una nueva familia de Dípteros, Anales del Museo Nacional, t. XVII, pág. 439-43, 1908.
- Himenópteros de Mendoza y de San Luis, Anales del Museo Nacional, t. XVII, pág. 455, 1908.
- Los insectos dañinos a la horticultura. El Torito (Ditoboderus abderus), Boletín Agrícola Ganadero, t. 8, pág. 4-8, 1908.
- Descripción de una larva de Glyptobasis, Revista Chilena de Historia Natural, t. II, 1908.
- Sobre la avispa langosticida, Revista del Jardín Zoológico, Buenos Aires, 1908.
- Notas sobre algunos Arácnidos, Anales del Museo Nacional, t. XIX, pág. 45, 1909.
- Himenópteros nuevos de las repúblicas del Plata y del Brasil, Anales del Museo Nacional, t. XIX, pág. 49-69, 1909.
- Una Anthophorina parásita, Anales del Museo Nacional, t. XIX, pág. 81-83, 1909.
- Dípteros e Himenópteros de Mendoza, Anales del Museo Nacional, t. XIX, pág. 85-105, 1909.
- El Bicho colorado, Anales del Museo Nacional, t. XIX, pág. 211-217, 1909.
- Notas Himenopterológicas, Anales del Museo Nacional, t. XIX, pág. 219-23, 1909.
- Himenóptera paraguayensis, Anales del Museo Nacional, t. XIX, pág. 225-256, 1909.
- Himenópteros en Mendoza y de San Luis, folleto, Buenos Aires, Impr. de J. A. Alsina, 1909.
- Coleópteros argentinos y bolivianos, en Anales Sociedad Científica Argentina, t. LXIX, pág. 205, 1910.
- Sur les Aneyloscelis et genres vaisins, Boletín de la Sociedad Entomológica Francesa, pág. 211-213, 1910.
- Dos insectos nuevos chilenos, Revista Chilena de Historia Natural, t. IV, pág. 67-69, 1910.
- Sur quelques hyménoptères du Chili, Revista Chilena de Historia Natural, t. IV, pág. 141-146, 1910.
- El género Pepsis en Chile, Revista Chilena de Historia Natural, t. IV, pág. 201-210, 1910.
- Quelques nouveau Ceropalides du Musée de S. Paulo, Revista del Museo Paulista, t. VIII, pág. 64-70, 1910.
- Dípteros nuevos o poco conocidos de Sud América, Revista del Museo Paulista, t. VIII, pág. 469-484, 1910.
- Los mosquitos de la República Argentina, Congreso Científico Internacional Americano, t. 1 351, 1910.
- Himenópteros argentinos, Anales del Museo Nacional, t. XX, pág. 205-316, 1910.
- Sobre la Brachycoma acridiorum (Weyenb.), Anales del Museo Nacional, t. XXII, pág. 444-446, 1912.
- Descripción de un nuevo una anthopgénero y especie nueva de Chironomidae (Dípt.), Anales del Museo Nacional, t. XXII, pág. 451-456, 1912.
- Descripción de un nuevo género y especie de cochinilla de la República Argentina, Anales del Museo Nacional, t. XXIII, pág. 279-281, 1912.
- Los mosquitos de la República Argentina, Bol. Inst. Ent. Pat., t. 1, pág. 1-48, 1912.
- Description d´un Colèpteré argentin nouveau, Revista Physis, 1 (2), pág. 87-88, 1912.
- Himenópteros de la América Meridional, Anales del Museo Nacional, t. XIV, pág. 35, 1913.
- Description d´un Pandeleteius nouveau de Buenos Aires, Revista Physis, 2, pág. 192-193, 1913.
- Las plagas de la agricultura Nº1, folleto de vulgarización, 1913.
- Las plagas de la agricultura Nº2, folleto de vulgarización, 1913.
- Description d´un nouveau Chironomidae du Chili, Revista Chilena de Historia Natural, t. XVII, pág. 19-20, 1913.
- Description d´un nuovel Hymenóptère du Chili, Revista Chilena de Historia Natural, t. XVII, pág. 34, 1913.
- Description d´un nouveau Curculionidae du Chili, Revista Chilena de Historia Natural, t. XVII, pág. 39-40, 1913.
- Description d´un nouveau genre et d´une nouvelle espèce d´Hemiptère Sud Americaine, Revista Chilena de Historia Natural, t. XVII, pág. 151-152, 1913.
- Un nouveau genre et d´une nouvelle espece de Cynipide du Chili, Revista Chilena de Historia Natural, XVII, pág. 159-161, 1913.
- Una nouvelle espèce de Diptère pupirare du Chili, Revista Chilena de Historia Natural, t. XVII, pág. 201-204, 1913.
- Quelques Ichneumonidae nouveau recueillis par M. le Prof. Porter dans les provinces d´Aconcagua et Tacna, Revista Chilena de Historia Natural, t. XVII, pág. 238-241, 1913.
- Nuestros enemigos veraniegos. La diversidad de los mosquitos, Caras y Caretas, Año XV, Nº755, 1913.
- Los insectos dañinos, Caras y Caretas, Año XV, Nº760, 1913.
- La Ceratitis capitata y la drosophilia, Caras y Caretas, Año XV, Nº766 1913.
- Notes synonymiques sur quelques insectes argentins, Boletín de la Sociedad Entomológica Francesa, pág. 58-59, 1914.
- Une nouvelle espèce d´Ulidinas de Tucumán, Boletín de la Sociedad Entomológica Francesa, pág. 87-88, 1914.
- Notas entomológicas, Revista Physis, 1 (8), pág. 583-84, 1914.
- Les ennemies de la Diaspis pentagona dans la République Argentine, Nunquam Otiosus I., Imp. Zuppichini y Vargas., 1914.
- Notes sur quelques Dolichodérines argentines, Anales del Museo Nacional, t. XXVI, pág. 93-96, 1914.
- Description d ´un nouveau Syrphidae de la République Argentine, Anales del Museo Nacional, t. XXVI, pág. 97-98, 1914.
- Description de six Cecidomyidae (Dipt.) de Buenos Aires, Anales del Museo Nacional, t. XXVI, pág. 151-56, 1914.
- Sur les formes sexuelles de deux Dolichoderines, Anales del Museo Nacional, t. XXVI, pág. 231-234, 1914.
- Contribution à l´etude des Pepsis, Anales del Museo Nacional, t. XXVI, pág. 235-360, 1914.
- Description d´un nouveau Prionomitus du Chili, Anales de Zoología Aplicada, pág 29-30, 1914.
- Los Insectos y la Agricultura, "El Diario", tomo LXI, 14/7/1914.
- Las avispas útiles, el Philoponectroma pectinatum, Caras y Caretas, Nº 817, 1914.
- Description d´un Braconidae et d´un Proctotrupidae du Chili, Revista Chilena de Historia Natural, pág. 13-14, 1915.
- Description d´un hyménoptère du Chili, Revista Chilena de Historia Natural, XIX, pág. 69, 1915.
- Description de trois Chalcididae du Chili, Revista Chilena de Historia Natural, XIX, pág. 87-88, 1915.
- Sur la Prospalangia platensis (n. gen, n. sp.) (Hymen.) et sa biologie, Anales de la Sociedad Científica Argentina, 79, pàg. 314-320, 1915.
- Descripción de un género nuevo y una nueva especie de Tisanóptero de la República Argentina, Anales del Museo Nacional, t. XXVII, pág. 89-92, 1915.
- Un nouvel orthoptère de la République Argentine, Anales del Museo Nacional, t. XXVII, pág. 333-34, 1915.
- A propósito de la nota del doctor F. Lahille sobre Prospaltella Berlesei How., Anales del Museo Nacional, t. XXVII, pág. 353-358, 1915.
- Hyménoptéres parasites de l´Amérique Meridionale, Anales del Museo Nacional, t. XXVII, pág. 401-430, 1915.
- El Anopheles albitarsis F Lch. A., La semana médica, XXIII, nº 1151, 1915.
- La avispa contra la mosca (Prospalangia platensis), Caras y Caretas, nº 876, 1915.
- Descripción de una nueva mosca langosticida, Anales del Museo Nacional, t. XXVIiI, pág. 141-144, 1916.
- Algunas notas sobre mosquitos argentinos: su relación con las enfermedades palúdicas, etc. y descripción de tres especies nuevas, Anales del Museo Nacional, t. XXVIII, pág. 193-218, 1916.
- Notable caso de precocidad en el naranjo común, Revista Physis, II (10), pág. 175, 1916.
- El Anópheles albitarsis F. Lch. A., Revista Physis, II (10), pág. 175-77, 1916.
- Estudio fito-zoológico sobre algunos Lepidópteros argentinos productores de agallas, Anales de la Sociedad Científica Argentina, 82, pàg. 113-40, 1916.
- Le genre Xylocope Latreille dans la République Argentine, Revista Physis, II (12), pág. 407-21, 1916.
- Un caso anormal en Polistes canadensis, var Ferreri Sauss, Revista Physis, II (12), pág. 423-24, 1916.
- Sobre la variabilidad de algunos Crisomélidos, caso de Chalcophana lineata (Germ.), Revista Physis, II (12), pág. 424-25, 1916.
- Description d´un nouveau genre et d´une nouvelle espece de Staphylinidae myrmecophile, Revista Physis, II (12), pág. 431-32, 1916.
- Descripción de un nuevo Carábido de la República Argentina, Revista Physis, II (12), pág. 464-65, 1916.
- Polistes canadensis, Chalcophena linesta, Staphylinides myrmécophile, nuevo Carábido, folleto, 7 pag., Imp. Coni, 1916.
- Un insecto aprovechado, Caras y Caretas, nº 920, 1916.
- Un bicho de cesto ingenioso, Caras y Caretas, nº 933, 1916.
- Estudio sobre el instinto de los insectos argentino. El asesino, Caras y Caretas, nº 952, 1916.
- Description de trois Hyménoptères du Chili, Revista Chilena de Historia Natural, XX, pág. 20-28, 1916.
- Description d´un nouveau Coléoptère du Chili, Revista Chilena de Historia Natural, XX, pág. 75-78, 1916.
- Un nouvel Empididae du Chili, Revista Chilena de Historia Natural, XX, pág. 83-89, 1916.
- Description d´une nouvelle espèce de Thrips du Chili, Revista Chilena de Historia Natural, XX, pág. 109-111, 1916.
- Description d´un nouveau genre et d´une nouvelle espèce d´Ortalidae du Chili, Anales de Zoología Aplicada, Año III, pág. 12-13, 1916.
- Description de deux Hyménoptères Chiliens, Anales de Zoología Aplicada, Año III, pág. 24-27, 1916.
- Descripción de dos nuevos himenópteros de Buenos Aires, Physis, III, pág. 90-91, 1916.
- Description d´un nouveau Colubridae Aglypha de la République Argentine, Physis, III, pág. 94, 1916.
- Las plagas de la Agricultura I, Anales de la Sociedad Rural Argentina, t. L, pág. 594-95, 1916.
- Las plagas de la Agricultura II, Anales de la Sociedad Rural Argentina, t. LI, pág. 66-67, 1917.
- Un enemigo de las frutas: la Ceratitis capitata, Anales de la Sociedad Rural Argentina, t. LI, pág. 301, 1917.
- El piojo del pino Leucaspis pini, Anales de la Sociedad Rural Argentina, t. LI, pág. 384, 1917.
- Consideraciones sobre el parasitismo del Bicho de Cesto, Anales de la Sociedad Rural Argentina, t. LI, pág. 399, 1917.
- El Bicho Moro, Epicauta adspersa, Anales de la Sociedad Rural Argentina, t. LI, pág. 591-600, 1917.
- El pequeño escarabajo negro, Dyscinetus gagates Burm, Anales de la Sociedad Rural Argentina, t. LI, pág. 600-601, 1917.
- Descripción de dos nuevos Himenópteros de Buenos Aires, Physis, III (13), pág. 90-91, 1917.
- Description d´un nouveau Colubridae aglypha de la República Argentina: Zamenis argentinus, Physis, III, página 91, 1917.
- Description d´une nouvelle espèce de Moustique de Buenos Aires, Physis, III (13), pág. 226, 1917.
- Sur une Cécidie de Physalis viscosa: description de la cécidie et de la Cecidomyie, Physis, III (14), pág. 239-241, 1917.
- Description d´une Cécidie et de sa Cecidomyie d´une Lippia de Entre Ríos, Physis, III (15), pág. 411-413, 1917.
- Description d´une galle et du papillon qui la produit, Physis, III (15), pág. 449-451, 1917.
- Description d´une nouvelle Dexiinae argentine, Physis, III (16), pág. 115, 1917.
- Los pulgones de las plantas, Anales de la Sociedad Rural Argentina, t. LI, pág. 666-668, 1917.
- Una maravilla zoobotánica, Caras y Caretas, Nº 1002, 1917.
- Description d´un Mymaridae nouveau du Chili, Revista Chilena de Historia Natural, XXI, pág. 82-84, 1917.
- Description d'un nouveau sous-genre de Scymnus (Col.), Revista Chilena de Historia Natural, XXI, pág. 87-88, 1917.
- Sur quelques Dipteres de Lima, Anales de Zoología Aplicada, Año IV, págs. 16–18, 1917.
- Quatre Hyménoptères parasites du Chili, Anales de Zoología Aplicada, Año IV, págs. 25-29, 1917.
- Un parasite nouveau de Catocephala rufosignata, Anales de Zoología Aplicada, Año IV, págs. 31-32, 1917.
- La Fauna Argentina, Saint Hnos., Buenos Aires 1917.
- Quelque Diptères du Chili, Revista Chilena de Historia Natural, XXII, pág. 49-50, 1918.
- Cucilletta d'Insectes au Rio Blanco I. Hyménoptères, Revista Chilena de Historia Natural, XXII, pág. 161-166, 1918.
- Cucilletta d'Insectes au Rio Blanco. II. Revista Chilena de Historia Natural, XXII, pág. 167-171, 1918.
- Sobre algunos Himenópteros útiles del Sud del Brasil, Anales de la Sociedad Rural Argentina, t. LII, pág. 7-11, 1918.
- El gusano de los naranjos, Anales de la Sociedad Rural Argentina, t. LII, pág. 73-76, 1918.
- Tres nuevas cochinillas argentinas y sus parásitos, Anales de la Sociedad Rural Argentina, t. LII, pág. 148-58, 1918.
- Método Biológico contra las plagas aplicado al Oceticus platensis. La Parexorista Caridei, Anales de la Sociedad Rural Argentina, t. LII, pág. 207-215, 1918.
- La mosca de las frutas, Anastrepha fraterculus, Anales de la Sociedad Rural Argentina, t. LII, pág. 273-276, 1918.
- La polilla de los graneros, Calandra oryzae, Tinea granella, Anales de la Sociedad Rural Argentina, t. LII, pág. 339-342, 1918.
- La mosca brava, Anales de la Sociedad Rural Argentina, t. LII, pág. 496-498, 1918.
- La polilla del grano, Sitotrogra cerealilla, Anales de la Sociedad Rural Argentina, t. LII, pág. 683-585, 1918.
- La galle et la cécidomyie d'Aeschynomene montevidensis, Physis, IV, págs. 312-313, 1918.
- Description d´une nouvelle espée de Sphex de la République Argentine, Physis, IV, págs. 347-48, 1918.
- Un Bembécido cazador de Hemípteros, Physis, IV, págs. 348-49, 1918.
- Sobre una lepidopterocecidia del lecherón Sapium aucuparium, Physis, IV, págs. 356, 1918.
- Description de deux Coleopteres Cantharides de Catamarca, Physis, IV, págs. 360-61, 1918.
- Description d´un Chalcidien gallicole de la République Argentine, Boletín de la Sociedad Entomológica Francesa, pág. 82-84, 1918.
- Nephila riverai, nouvelle araignée argentine, Boletín de la Sociedad Entomológica Francesa, pág. 82-84, 1918.
- Sur quelques insectes du Pérou, Revista Chilena de Historia Natural, XXII, pág. 122-125, 1918.
- Memoria de los trabajos realizados por el instituto Biológico de la Sociedad Rural Argentina. Sección Entomología, Publicación de la S. R. A., págs. 32-36, 1919.
- La babosa de los perales, Caliroa limacina (Retz.), Anales de la Sociedad Rural Argentina, t. LIII, pág. 15-17, 1919.
- El Pulex irritans L., parásito del cerdo, Anales de la Sociedad Rural Argentina, t. LIII, pág. 443-44, 1919.
- Una agalla en Brigeron bonaerensis L, Physis, IV, págs. 601-2, 1919.
- Un nuevo género Philoscaptus para Podalgus bonaerensis, Physis, IV, pág. 602, 1919.
- Tenthredines nouveau du Chili, Revista Chilena de Historia Natural, XXIII, pág. 49-50, 1919.
- Deux Coléoptères Chiliens nouveaux, Anales de Zoología Aplicada, Año VI, pág. 26-29, 1919.
- Vespides, Eumenides et Sphegides Sud Americains de la Coll. J de Gaulle, Boletín de la Sociedad Entomológica Francesa, pág. 391-411, 1919.
- Description d´un Arceris nouveau de Nouvelle Guinèe, Boletín de la Sociedad Entomológica Francesa, pág. 411, 1919.
- El Selifron, Aspiraciones, 2 (8), págs. 382-84, 1919.
- El Eumenes, Aspiraciones, 2 (10), págs. 467-69, 1919.
- Cucilletta d'Insectes au Rio Blanco III Dipteres, Revista Chilena de Historia Natural, XXIII, pág. 40-44, 1919.
- Description d´un nouvel Homoptère Chilien. Revista Chilena de Historia Natural, XXIV, pág. 10-11, 1920.
- Description d´un nouveau Moustique do Pérou, Description d´un nouvel Homoptère Chilien. Revista Chilena de Historia Natural, XXIV, pág. 41-43, 1920.
- Insectes du Pérou, Anales de la Sociedad Científica Argentina, LXXIX, págs. 27-55, 1920.
- Insectes du Pérou II, Anales de la Sociedad Científica Argentina, LXXIX, págs. 124-134, 1920.
- El Bicho de Cesto. Cómo vive, se multiplica y se difunde, Anales de la Sociedad Rural Argentina, t. LIV, pág. 235-247, 1920.
- Insectos útiles y dañinos de Río Grande do Sul y del Plata, Anales de la Sociedad Rural Argentina, t. LIV, pág. 277-283, 1920.
- La Diatraea saccharalis en la Provincia de Buenos Aires, Anales de la Sociedad Rural Argentina, t. LIV, pág. 943-948, 1920.
- Las agallas del Molle de incienso, Aspiraciones, 2 (13), págs. 124-134, 1920.
- Sobre un cristal de marcasita (sulfuro de hierro), Aspiraciones, 2 (15), págs. 208-211, 1920.
- Description d'un nouveau diptére chilien, parasite de Laora variabilis, Anales de Zoología Aplicada, Año VII, págs. 12-13, 1920.
- Un parasite de Notolophus antiqua, Anales de Zoología Aplicada, Año VII, pág. 15, 1920.
- Memoria de los trabajos realizados por el instituto Biológico de la Sociedad Rural Argentina. Sección Entomología. 1919-1920, Publicación de la S. R. A., págs. 57-62, 1921.
- La vaquita de la acacia Chapelus medios, Anales de la Sociedad Rural Argentina, t. LV, 1921.
- Un nuevo Psyllidae de la República Argentina (Gyropsylla ilicola, Revista de la Facultad de Agronomía de La Plata, XIV, págs. 82-89, 1921.
- Notas Coleopterológicas, Revista de la Facultad de Agronomía de La Plata, XIV, págs. 163-69, 1921.
- Hymenóptères nouveau du Chili, Revista Chilena de Historia Natural, XXV, pág. 128-129, 1921.
- Catalogue synonymique des Coccinellides du Chili, Revista Chilena de Historia Natural, XXV, pág. 453-456, 1921.
- Sur trois Coléoptères chiliens, Revista Chilena de Historia Natural, XXV, pág. 457-461, 1921.
- Description d'un nouveau genre et d'une nouvelle espèce D'Ipidae du Chili. Revista Chilena de Historia Natural, XXV, pág. 433-435, 1921.
- Los Tabánidos del Plata, Estudios, 20 (4), págs. 280-290; (5) págs. 366-78; (6) págs. 443-55.
- Description d'un Ceroplastes (Hem. Coccidae) de la République Argentine, et de son parasite (Hym. Chalcididae), Bulletin de la Société Entomologique de France, págs. 79-81, 1921.
- Nouveaux Hyménoptères parasites du Chili. Anales de Zoología Aplicada, VIII, págs. 6-8, 1921.
- Memoria de los trabajos realizados por el instituto Biológico de la Sociedad Rural Argentina. Sección Entomología. 1920-1921, Publicación de la S. R. A., págs. 52-55, 1922.
- El Bicho de Cesto. Campaña 1920-1921. Dos nuevos parásitos. Publicación de la S.R.A., folleto, 26 págs., 1922.
- El pulgón del manzano o pulgón lanígero, Anales Sociedad Rural Argentina, LVI, págs. 163-67, 1922.
- Descripción de varios Coleópteros de Buenos Aires, Anales Sociedad Rural Argentina, LVI, pág.263-, 1922.
- Biología de la Synthesiomyia brasiliana, Physis, V (20), págs. 292-93, 1922.
- Himenópteros y dípteros de varias procedencias. Anales Sociedad Científica Argentina, XCIII, pág. 119-45, 1922.
- Descripción de varios Coleópteros de Buenos Aires, Anales Sociedad Científica Argentina, XCIIII, pág. 263-305, 1922.
- Por dos Bichos (Réplica semicientífica a dos artículos ídem), Buenos Aires, 16 págs., 1922.
- Sur quelques Hyménoptères du Chili, Revista Chilena de Historia Natural, XXVII, pág. 124-128, 1923.
- Primera contribución para el conocimiento de los "Strepsiptera" argentinos, Revista de la Facultad de Agronomía de La Plata, XV, págs. 41-58, 1923.
- Himenóptera. Fam. Vespidae: Clypeolybia duckei n. sp, Revista de la Facultad de Agronomía de La Plata, XV, 1923.
- Una nueva mariposa argentina Allorhodoecia hampsoni, Revista de la Facultad de Agronomía de La Plata, XV, págs. 59-64, 1923.
- Cosas y Otras, Nunquam Otiosus II, 1923.
- Varios Himenópteros de América del Sud, Nunquam Otiosus II, 1923.
- Description de deux nouveaux Coléoptères du Chili II, Rehabilitation d´une espèce latreillium, Revista Chilena de Historia Natural, XXVII, pág. 39-43, 1923.
- A propósito de la mosca Melieria Pasciata (Wied), Revista Chilena de Historia Natural, XXVII, pág. 182-184, 1923.
- Un nouveau Spilochalcis du Chili, Revista Chilena de Historia Natural, XXVII, pág. 81, 1923.
- Description d´un nouveau Ciidae du Chili, Revista Chilena de Historia Natural, XXVII, pág. 29-30, 1923.
- Note sur un genre et une espèce de Coccinellides australiens passés inapercus, Bulletin de la Société Entomologique de France, págs. 227-229, 1923.
- Memoria de los trabajos realizados por el instituto Biológico de la Sociedad Rural Argentina. Sección Entomología. 1921-1922, Publicación de la S. R. A., págs. 40-43, 1923.
- La polilla del Repollo (Plutella maculipennis Curt.), Anales de la Sociedad Rural Argentina, LVII (4), págs. 162-166, 1923.
- Sur un diptère mineur des feuilles de Salvia splendens et deux hyménoptères ses parasites, Revue de Zoologie Agricole et Appliquée, XXII, págs. 153-158, Bordeaux, 1923.
- Un Phlebotomus nuevo para la República Argentina (Phelebotomus cortellezzii), La Semana Médica, XXX, págs. 361-364, 1923.
- Sur une collection de Coccinellides (et un Phalacoidae) du British Museum, Anales del Museo Nacional, t. XXXIII, pág. 145-175, 1924.
- Memoria de los trabajos realizados por el instituto Biológico de la Sociedad Rural Argentina. Sección Entomología. 1922-1923, Publicación de la S. R. A., págs. 37-44, 1924.
- Description d´une galle de Calliandra bicolor et de l´Hyménoptère qui la produit, Revista Facultad de Agronomía, XV, 1924.
- Quelques insectes du Paraguay, Revista Chilena de Historia Natural, XXVIII, pág. 67-72, 1924.
- Sur quelques Diptères chiliens, Revista Chilena de Historia Natural, XXVIII, pág. 104-111, 1924.
- Sur les Heliconisa et leurs différences sexuelles, Revista de la Universidad de Buenos Aires, 2º Serie, Sección V, tomo I, p. 37, 1924. En colaboración con el Dr. E. L. Bouvier.
- Sur quelques insectes de San José de Maipú, Revista Chilena de Historia Natural, XXVIV, pág. 34-35, 1925.
- Coléoptères: principalment Coccinellides du British Museum, Nunquam Otiosus III, Imp. Ferrari, 1925.
- Sur une collection de coccinellides du British Muséum, Anales del Museo Nacional, t. XXXIII, pág. 144, 1925.
- Coccinellides du British Muséum avec une nouvelle famille de coléoptères, Anales del Museo Nacional, t. XXXIII, pág. 195, 1925.
- Nuestros benefactores anónimos de las plantas: un nuevo insecto útil Sigalphus primus, Revista de la Facultad de Agronomía, XVI, Nº 1 y 2, págs. 57-63, 1925.
- Parásitos e hiperparásitos de Diatraea saccharalis en la caña de azúcar de Tucumán, Revista Ind. Y Agr. de Tucumán, XVII, Nº 7 y 8, págs. 163-166, 1925.
- Coléoptères et diptères chiliens, Revista Chilena de Historia Natural, XXIX, pág. 169-173, 1925.
- Coccinellides du British Museum, Nunquam Otiosus IV, 1925.
- Coléoptères Sud-Américains, Nunquam Otiosus IV, 1925
- Un Coléoptère et un Diptère nouveaux de la Géorgie du Sud, Comunicaciones del Museo Nacional de Buenos Aires, t. II, pág. 169, 1925.
- Descripción de un gorgojo que ataca la zanahoria: Aulametopiellus dauci n. gen. n. sp., Physis, VIII (30), págs. 414-416, 1926.
- Une nouveau Staphylins (Col.) muricole de la République Argentine, Anales del Museo Nacional, t. XXXIV, pág. 17, 1926.
- Florentino Ameghino, Nunquam Otiosus V, 1926.
- Hyménoptères du Colombia, Nunquam Otiosus V, 1926.
- Obras y trabajos recibidos, Nunquam Otiosus V, 1926.
- La lucha biológica contra el Bicho de Cesto (Oecetios kirbyi var. Platensis, Anales Sociedad Científica Argentina, CII, págs. 6-33, 1926.
- Coléoptères et hyménoptères du Cuzco (Pérou), Revista Chilena de Historia Natural, XXX, pág. 44-48, 1926.
- Un nouveau Tetrastichus (Chalcididae) parasite dans les nids de Latrodectus mactans, Revista Chilena de Historia Natural, XXX, pág. 57-58, 1926.
- Description d'un nouveau genre et nouvelle espèce d'Ulididae du Chili, Revista Chilena de Historia Natural, XXX, pág. 187-188, 1926.
- Sur le Syntomaspis laetus (Phil.), chalcidien parasite des galles de Colliguaya odorífera, Revista Chilena de Historia Natural, XXX, pág. 324-325, 1926.
- Description provisoire de deux espèces nouvelles d´Anophelinae argentina, P. M. A., 3, 1926.
- Contribución para el conocimiento de los mosquitos argentinos: descripción de un nuevo Megarhinus: Megarhinus tucumanus, Boletín del Instituto de Clínica Quirúrgica, 2, págs. 318–321, 1926.
- Notas sobre los Anophelinos argentinos, Physis, 8 (30), págs. 305-15, 1926.
- Elementos de mineralogía: texto aprobado por el S.G. para los colegios nacionales y escuelas normales, Buenos Aires, Libr. J. Moly, 1926.
- Parásitos e hiperparásitos de Diatraea saccharalis en la caña de azúcar de Tucumán (Segunda Parte), Revista Ind. y Agr. de Tucumán, XVIII, 1927.
- Nouveaux hyménoptères parasites du Chili, Revista Chilena de Historia Natural, XXXI, pág. 14-16, 1927.
- Contribución para el conocimiento de los Anopheles Argentinos, C. N. M. (3º) 7, págs. 666-667, 1928.
- Hyménoptères Sud-Américains du Deustches Entomologisches Institut: Terebrantia, Berlin, Dahlem, 1928.
- Elementos de Geología, Librería José Moly, Buenos Aires, 1928.
- Contribution pour la connaissance des chrysomélides du Chili, Revista Chilena de Historia Natural, XXXII, pág. 204-220, 1928.
- A Propósito de Masarygus Brethes y de Sarcophaga caridei Brethes, Revista de la Sociedad Entomológica Argentina, 2(7), págs. 73-74, 1928. (póstumo).

== Bibliography ==
- Rossi Belgrano Alejandro and Mariana (2018). "Juan Brèthes (Frère Judulien Marie) Primer Entomólogo del Museo Nacional", Buenos Aires, Argentina, ISBN 978-987-42-8067-1
- Commisión Popular de Homenaje (1928), "Dr. Juan Brèthes, Su Obra", Imp. El Centenario, Buenos Aires.
- Porter Mossó Carlos, "Galeria de Colaboradores" in "Chilean Magazine of Pure and Applied Natural History", Santiago de Chile, 1915.
