= Dexia albifrons =

Dexia albifrons may refer to:

- Dexia albifrons Stephens, 1829, a taxonomic synonym for the fly species Thelaira nigripes
- Dexia albifrons Walker, 1853, a taxonomic synonym for the fly species Ptilodexia rufipennis
