= Hubneria estigmenensis =

Scientific classification
- Kingdom: Animalia
- Phylum: Arthropoda
- Class: Insecta
- Order: Diptera
- Family: Tachinidae
- Subfamily: Exoristinae
- Tribe: Eryciini
- Genus: Hubneria
- Species: H. estigmenensis

Binomial name
- Hubneria estigmenensis (Sellers, 1943)

Synonyms
- Aplomya estigmenensis Sellers, 1943

Species of fly

Hubneria estigmenensis is a species of bristle fly in the family Tachinidae.

== Distribution ==
United States, Canada.
