= Hubneria affinis =

Scientific classification
- Kingdom: Animalia
- Phylum: Arthropoda
- Class: Insecta
- Order: Diptera
- Family: Tachinidae
- Subfamily: Exoristinae
- Tribe: Eryciini
- Genus: Hubneria
- Species: H. affinis

Binomial name
- Hubneria affinis (Fallén, 1810)

Synonyms
- Carcelia nigripes Robineau-Desvoidy, 1830; Exorista polychaeta Macquart, 1849; Huebneria polychaeta (Macquart, 1849); Tachina affinis Fallén, 1810

Species of fly

Hubneria affinis is a species of bristle fly in the family Tachinidae. It parasitizes moths such as Arctia caja by laying eggs in the larvae that eventually kill the host.

== Distribution ==
China, British Isles, Belarus, Czech Republic, Estonia, Hungary, Latvia, Lithuania, Poland, Romania, Slovakia, Ukraine, Denmark, Finland, Norway, Sweden, Bulgaria, Greece, Italy, Macedonia, Portugal, Serbia, Slovenia, Spain, “Yugoslavia”, Austria, Belgium, France, Germany, Netherlands, Switzerland, Mongolia, Russia, Transcaucasia.
