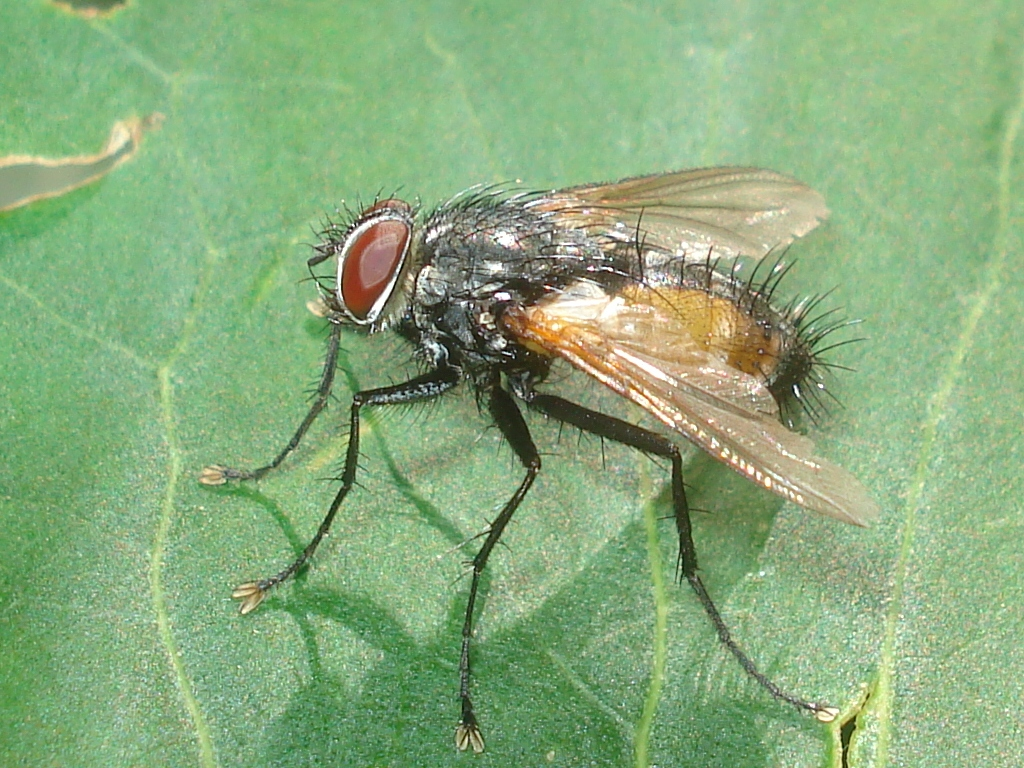
- Thelaira solivaga

Scientific classification
- Kingdom: Animalia
- Phylum: Arthropoda
- Class: Insecta
- Order: Diptera
- Family: Tachinidae
- Subfamily: Dexiinae
- Tribe: Voriini
- Genus: Thelaira
- Species: T. solivaga

Binomial name
- Thelaira solivaga (Harris, 1780)

Synonyms
- Thelaira abdominalis Robineau-Desvoidy, 1830; Musca solivagus Harris, 1780

= Thelaira solivaga =

Species of fly

Thelaira solivaga is a species of fly in the family Tachinidae.

== Distribution ==
Albania, Andorra, Austria, British Isles, Bulgaria, Channel Islands, China, Corse, Croatia, Czech Republic, France, Germany, Greece, Hungary, Iran, Italy, Lithuania, Macedonia, Netherlands, North Korea, Norway, Poland, Portugal, Romania, Russia, Serbia, Slovakia, Spain, Sweden, Switzerland, Transcaucasia, Turkey.
