= Ptilodexia tinctipennis =

Scientific classification
- Kingdom: Animalia
- Phylum: Arthropoda
- Class: Insecta
- Order: Diptera
- Family: Tachinidae
- Subfamily: Dexiinae
- Tribe: Dexiini
- Genus: Ptilodexia
- Species: P. tinctipennis

Binomial name
- Ptilodexia tinctipennis (Curran, 1934)

Synonyms
- Rhynchodexia tinctipennis Curran, 1934

Species of fly

Ptilodexia tinctipennis is a species of fly in the family Tachinidae.

== Distribution ==
Guyana.
