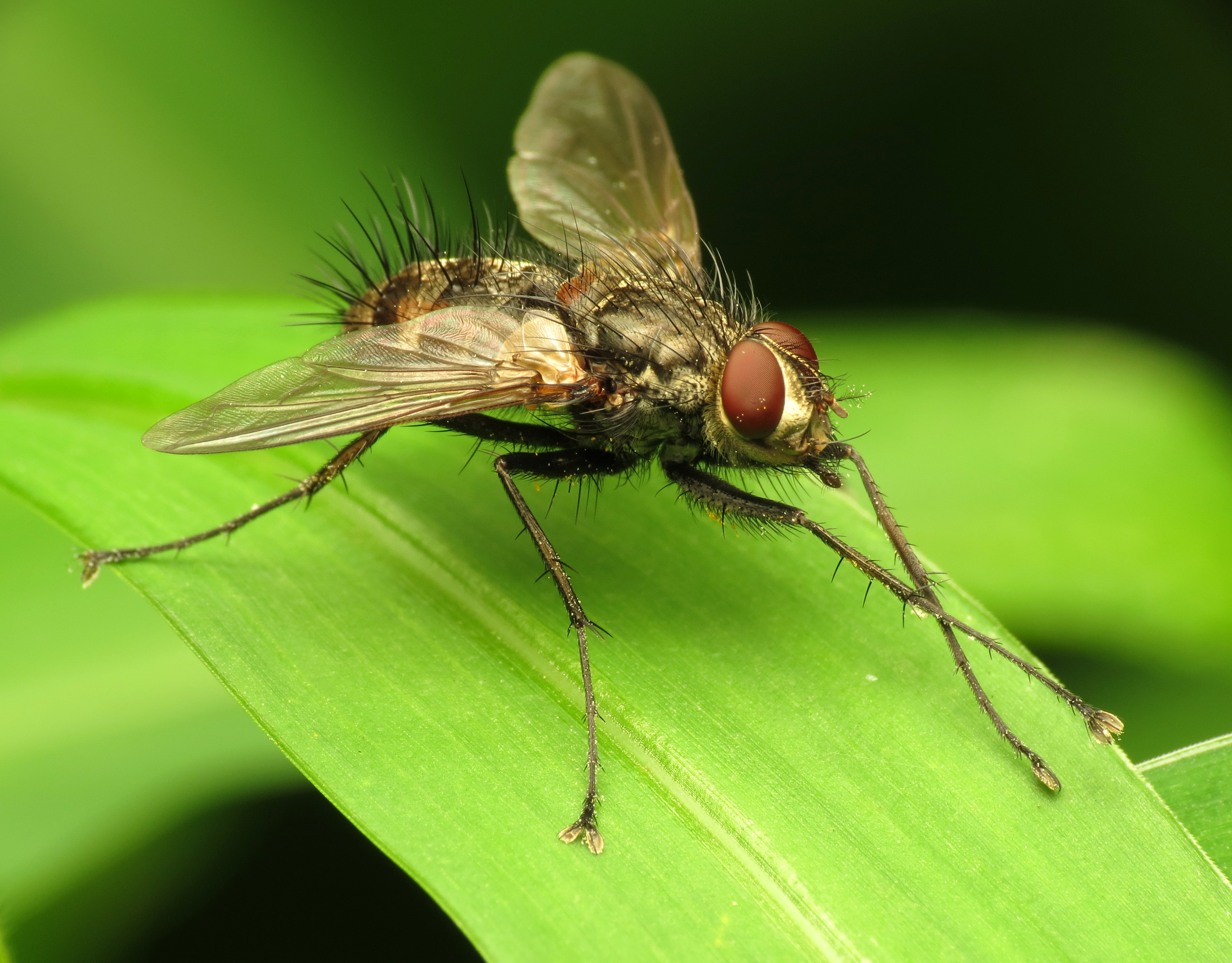

Scientific classification
- Kingdom: Animalia
- Phylum: Arthropoda
- Class: Insecta
- Order: Diptera
- Family: Tachinidae
- Subfamily: Dexiinae
- Tribe: Dexiini
- Genus: Ptilodexia; Brauer & von Berganstamm, 1889

Type species
- Ptilodexia carolinensis Brauer & von Bergenstamm, 1889

Synonyms
- Clinoneura Brauer & von Berganstamm, 1889; Myoceropsis Townsend, 1915

= Ptilodexia =

Genus of flies

Ptilodexia is a genus of flies in the family Tachinidae.

== Species ==
- Ptilodexia agilis Reinhard, 1943
- Ptilodexia angulata (Wulp, 1891)
- Ptilodexia anthracina (Bigot, 1889)
- Ptilodexia argentina (Bigot, 1889)
- Ptilodexia arida (Curran, 1930)
- Ptilodexia californica Wilder, 1979
- Ptilodexia canescens (Walker, 1853)
- Ptilodexia carolinensis Brauer & von Berganstamm, 1889
- Ptilodexia cingulipes Blanchard, 1966
- Ptilodexia conjuncta (Wulp, 1891)
- Ptilodexia constrictans (Wulp, 1891)
- Ptilodexia discolor (Wulp, 1891)
- Ptilodexia flavotessellata (Walton, 1914)
- Ptilodexia fraterna (Wulp, 1891)
- Ptilodexia fumipennis (Bigot, 1889)
- Ptilodexia halone (Walker, 1849)
- Ptilodexia harpasa (Walker, 1849)
- Ptilodexia imitatrix (Wulp, 1891)
- Ptilodexia incerta West, 1925
- Ptilodexia lateralis (Walker, 1836)
- Ptilodexia macroptera (Wulp, 1891)
- Ptilodexia maculata Wilder, 1979
- Ptilodexia major (Bigot, 1889)
- Ptilodexia mathesoni (Curran, 1930)
- Ptilodexia muscaria (Walker, 1853)
- Ptilodexia obscura West, 1925
- Ptilodexia omissa (Wulp, 1891)
- Ptilodexia pacifica Wilder, 1979
- Ptilodexia planifrons (Wulp, 1891)
- Ptilodexia ponderosa (Curran, 1930)
- Ptilodexia prexaspes (Walker, 1849)
- Ptilodexia punctipennis (Wulp, 1891)
- Ptilodexia rubricauda (Bigot, 1889)
- Ptilodexia rubricornis (Wulp, 1891)
- Ptilodexia rubriventris (Macquart, 1846)
- Ptilodexia rufianalis (Wulp, 1891)
- Ptilodexia rufipennis (Macquart, 1844)
- Ptilodexia rutilans (Wulp, 1891)
- Ptilodexia sabroskyi Wilder, 1979
- Ptilodexia scutellata (Wulp, 1891)
- Ptilodexia simplex (Bigot, 1889)
- Ptilodexia simulans (Wulp, 1891)
- Ptilodexia sororia (Williston, 1896)
- Ptilodexia spinosa (Bigot, 1889)
- Ptilodexia strenua (Robineau-Desvoidy, 1830)
- Ptilodexia striata (Wulp, 1891)
- Ptilodexia strigilata (Wulp, 1891)
- Ptilodexia tincticornis (Bigot, 1889)
- Ptilodexia tinctipennis (Curran, 1934)
- Ptilodexia varipes (Wulp, 1891)
- Ptilodexia vittigera Curran, 1934
- Ptilodexia ypsiliformis Blanchard, 1966
