= Ptilodexia mathesoni =

Scientific classification
- Kingdom: Animalia
- Phylum: Arthropoda
- Class: Insecta
- Order: Diptera
- Family: Tachinidae
- Subfamily: Dexiinae
- Tribe: Dexiini
- Genus: Ptilodexia
- Species: P. mathesoni

Binomial name
- Ptilodexia mathesoni (Curran, 1930)

Synonyms
- Rhynchiodexia mathesoni Curran, 1930

Species of fly

Ptilodexia mathesoni is a species of fly in the family Tachinidae.

== Distribution ==
Canada, United States.
