= Hubneria =

Scientific classification
- Kingdom: Animalia
- Phylum: Arthropoda
- Class: Insecta
- Order: Diptera
- Family: Tachinidae
- Subfamily: Exoristinae
- Tribe: Eryciini
- Genus: Hubneria; Robineau-Desvoidy, 1848

Type species
- Carcelia nigripes Robineau-Desvoidy, 1848

Synonyms
- Celea Robineau-Desvoidy, 1863; Cnossia Robineau-Desvoidy, 1863; Huebneria Marschall, 1873; Parexoristina Enderlein, 1936; Parexoristina Anonymous, 1937

Genus of flies

Hubneria is a genus of flies in the family Tachinidae.

== Species ==
- Hubneria affinis (Fallén, 1810)
- Hubneria estigmenensis (Sellers, 1943)
