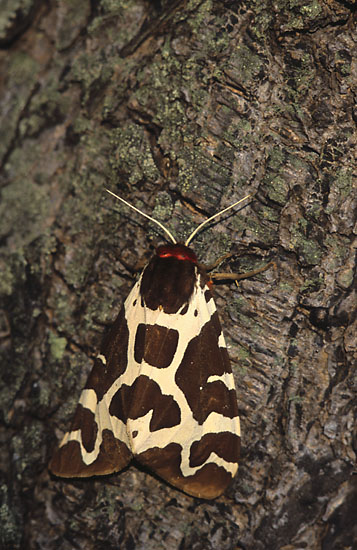
- Resting pose

Scientific classification
- Kingdom: Animalia
- Phylum: Arthropoda
- Clade: Pancrustacea
- Class: Insecta
- Order: Lepidoptera
- Superfamily: Noctuoidea
- Family: Erebidae
- Subfamily: Arctiinae
- Genus: Arctia
- Species: A. caja

Binomial name
- Arctia caja (Linnaeus, 1758)

Synonyms
- Phalaena caja Linnaeus, 1758

= Garden tiger moth =

Species of moth

Arctia caja, the garden tiger moth or great tiger moth is a moth of the family Erebidae. Arctia caja is a northern species found in the US, Canada, and Europe. The moth prefers cold climates with temperate seasonality, as the larvae overwinter, and preferentially chooses host plants that produce pyrrolizidine alkaloids. However, garden tiger moths are generalists, and will pick many different plants to use as larval host plants.

The conspicuous patterns on its wings serve as a warning to predators because the moth's body fluids are poisonous. Their effects are not yet fully known, but these toxins contain quantities of neurotoxic choline esters which act by interfering with the acetylcholine receptor. The colours are also ideal for frightening predators such as small birds—the moth normally hides its hindwings under the cryptic forewings when resting. Between stored toxins, conspicuous warning coloration, and sound cues that are generated mostly as a response to bats, A. caja presents itself as an inedible target for predators.

== Description ==
The garden tiger moth has a wingspan of 45 to 65 millimeters (1.8 to 2.6 in). The design of the wings vary; the front wings are brown with a white pattern (which is sometimes missing), the back wings are orange with a pattern of dark blue dots with black outlines. There are many aberrations (pattern and colour variants), partly obtained artificially and partly by chance. Oberthür, a French entomologist, mentions about 500 different variants shown in 36 figures. Seitz gives an account of some named aberrations.^{[3]}

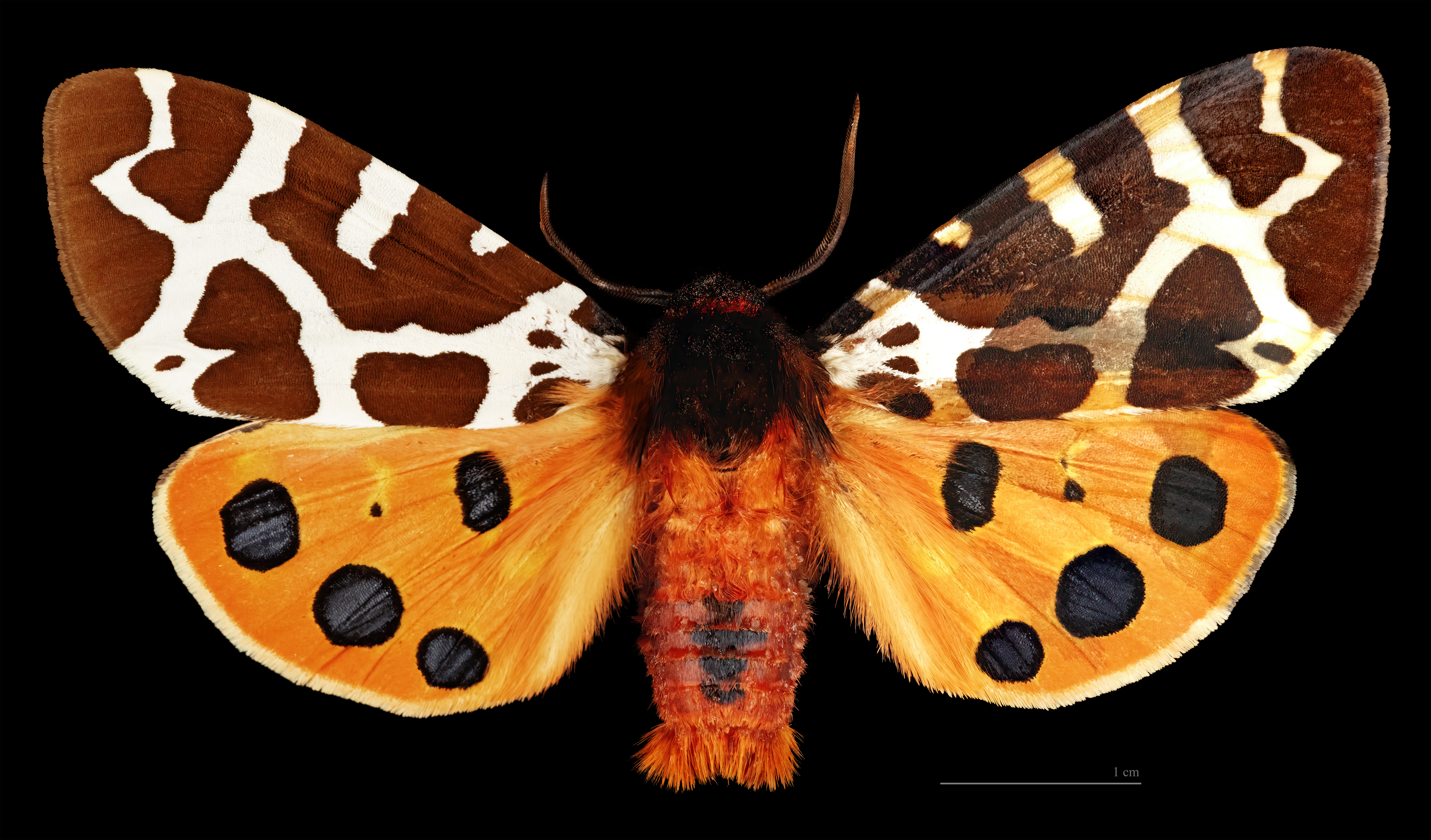
♂

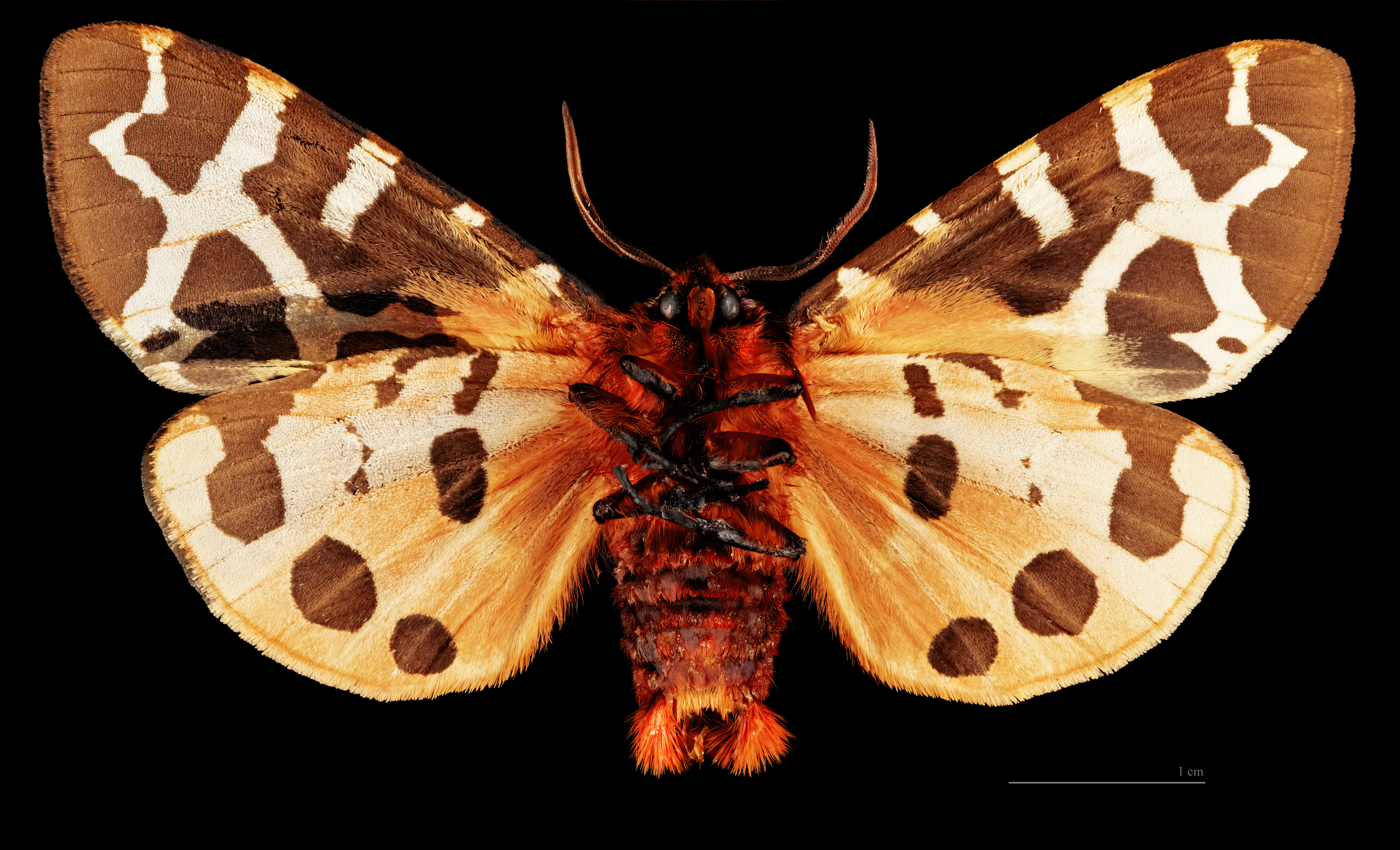
♂ △
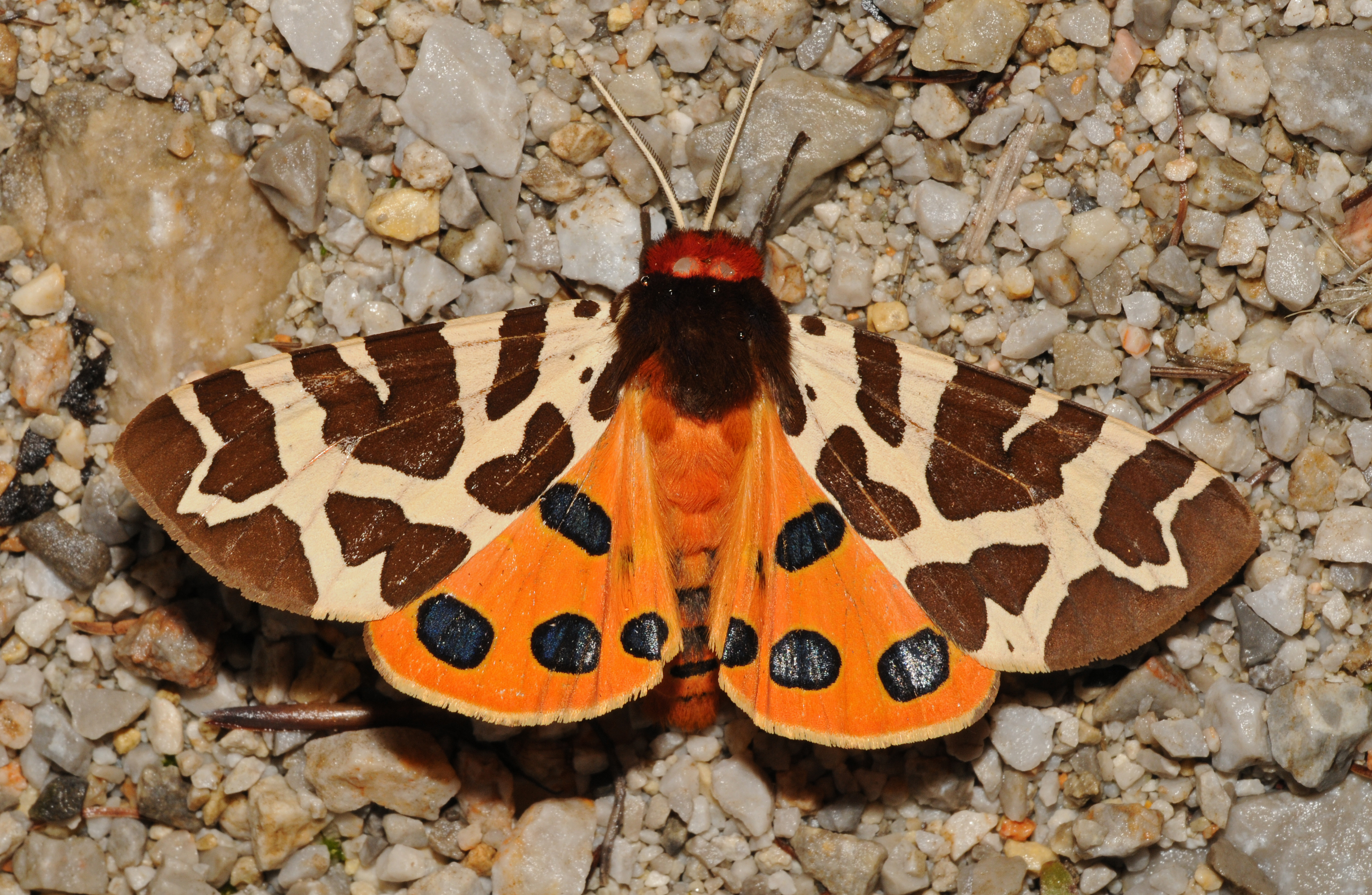
Hindwing pattern

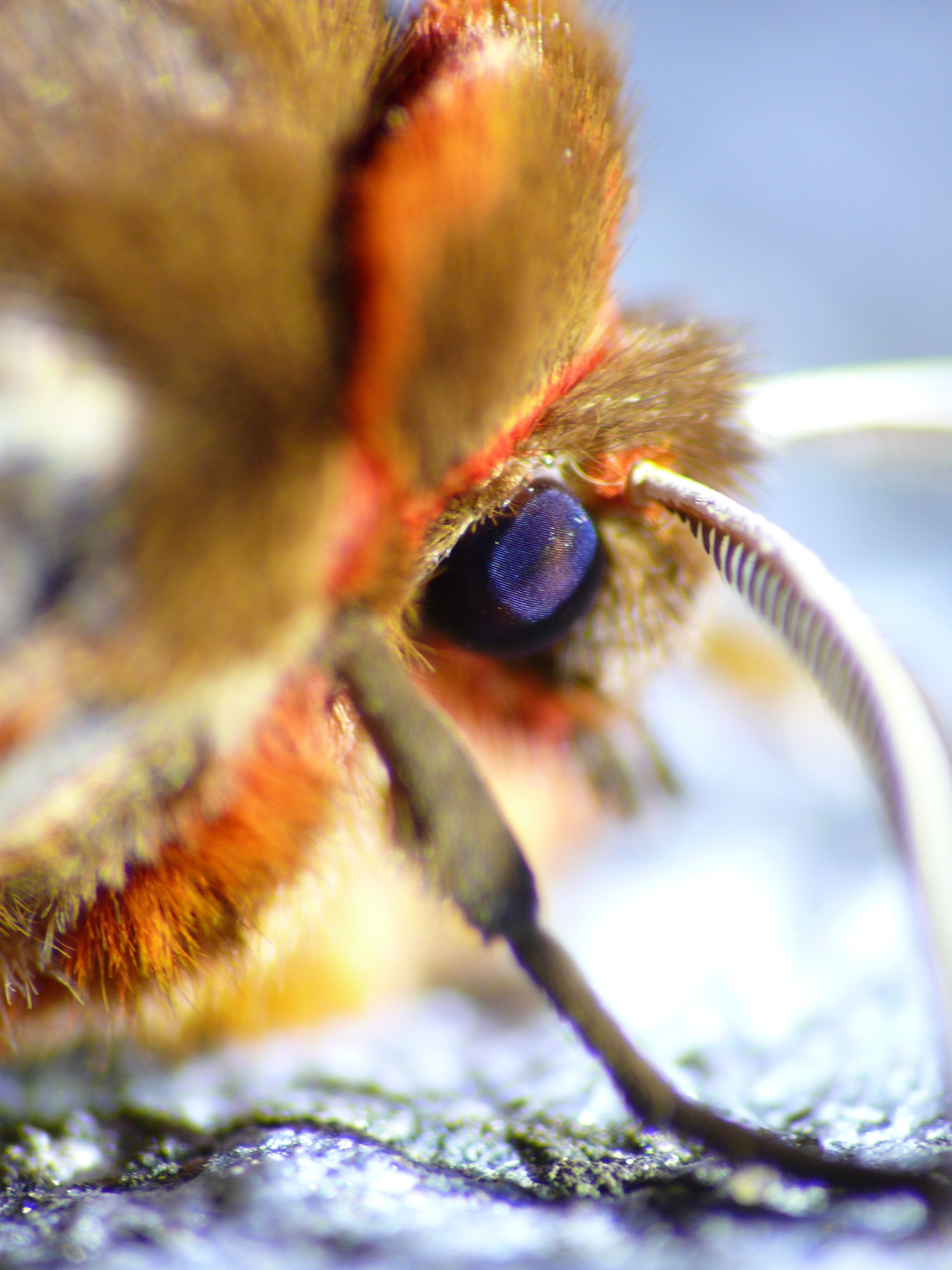
Close-up

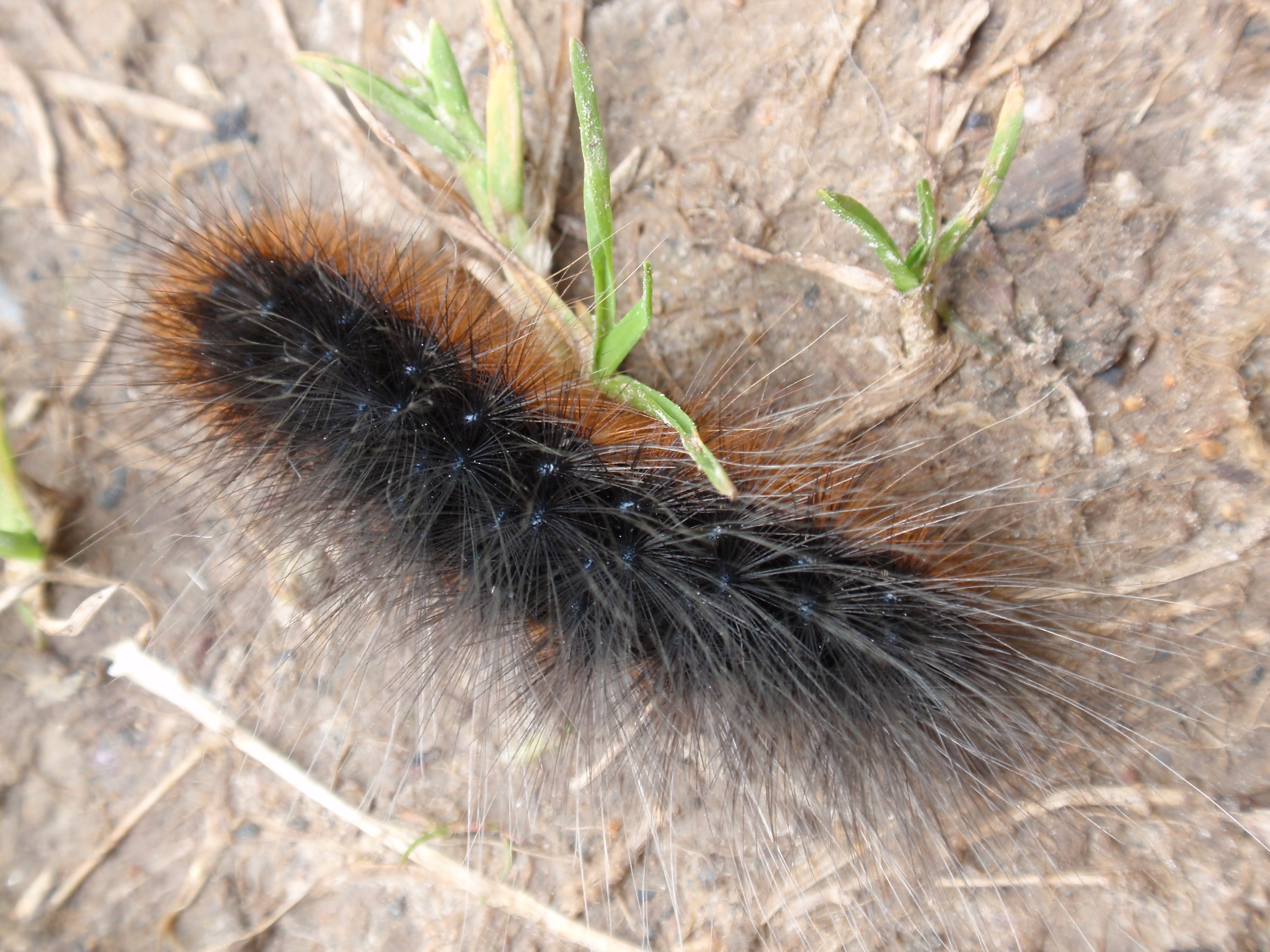
"Woolly bear" caterpillar

== Geographic range ==
The garden tiger moth lives in the northern United States, Canada, and Europe. It prefers cold, temperate climates. The garden tiger moth is found throughout much of the Palearctic, in Europe as far north as Sápmi, in Northern Asia and Central Asia, and in North America. In the mountains (Tien Shan), this species is found up to an elevation of 3,000 metres (9,800 ft).

== Habitat ==
This species prefers numerous types of wild habitat, from grasslands to forests. Because of its generalist diet, it is not constrained by features such as host plant location. The only constant quality of a habitat for these animals is that it must be seasonal and cool, and like many members of Genus Arctia, tropical climates do not suit garden tiger moth larvae or adults.

== Food resources ==
=== Caterpillars ===
==== Host plant preferences ====
The larvae of A. caja are generalists, meaning they eat a large variety of plants without much specialization. However, most larvae of this species obtain their characteristic toxic compounds from their diet, which can vary from foxglove (and members of the daisy family) to species in completely other plant families, such as plantago.

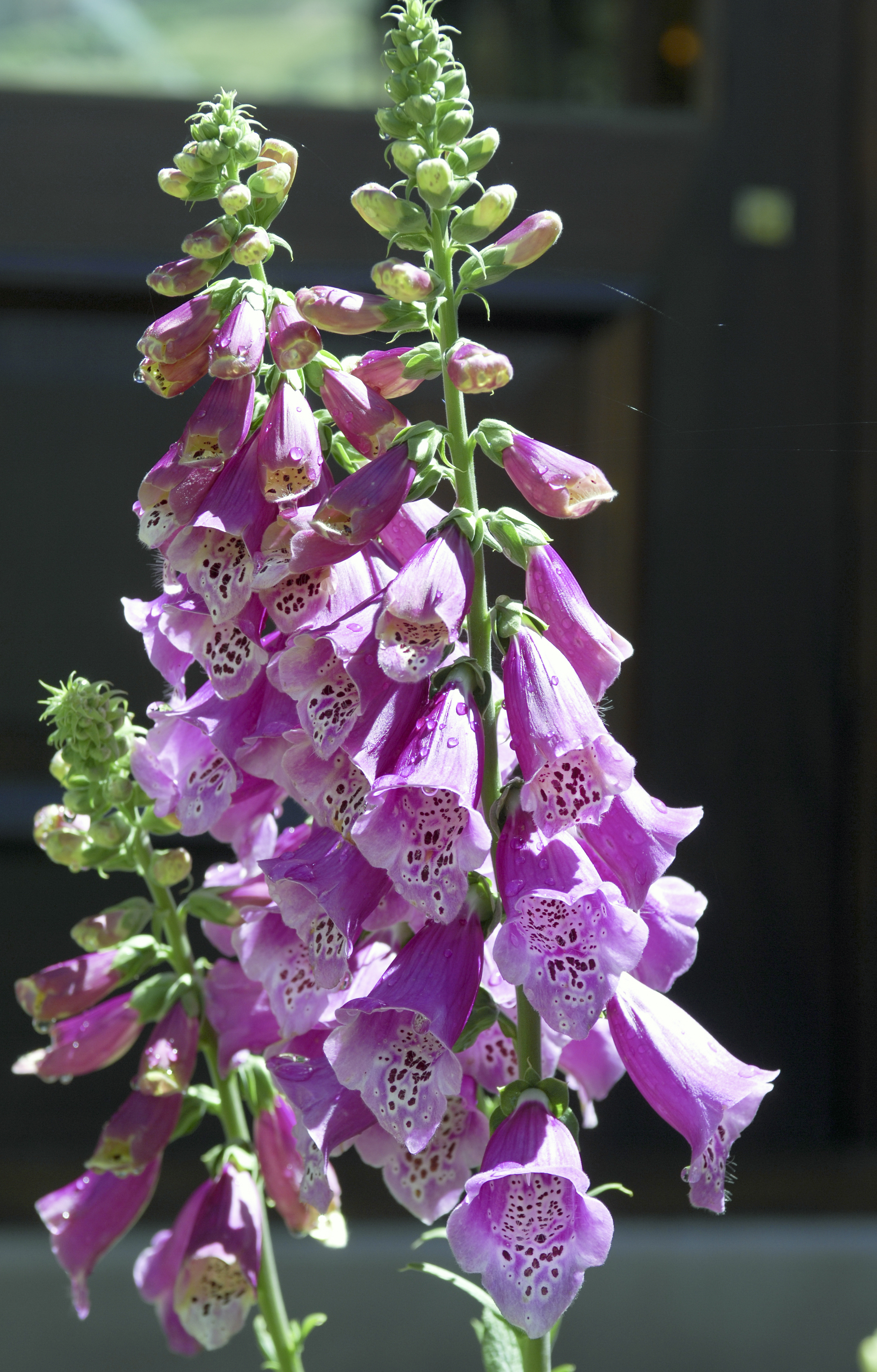
Foxglove

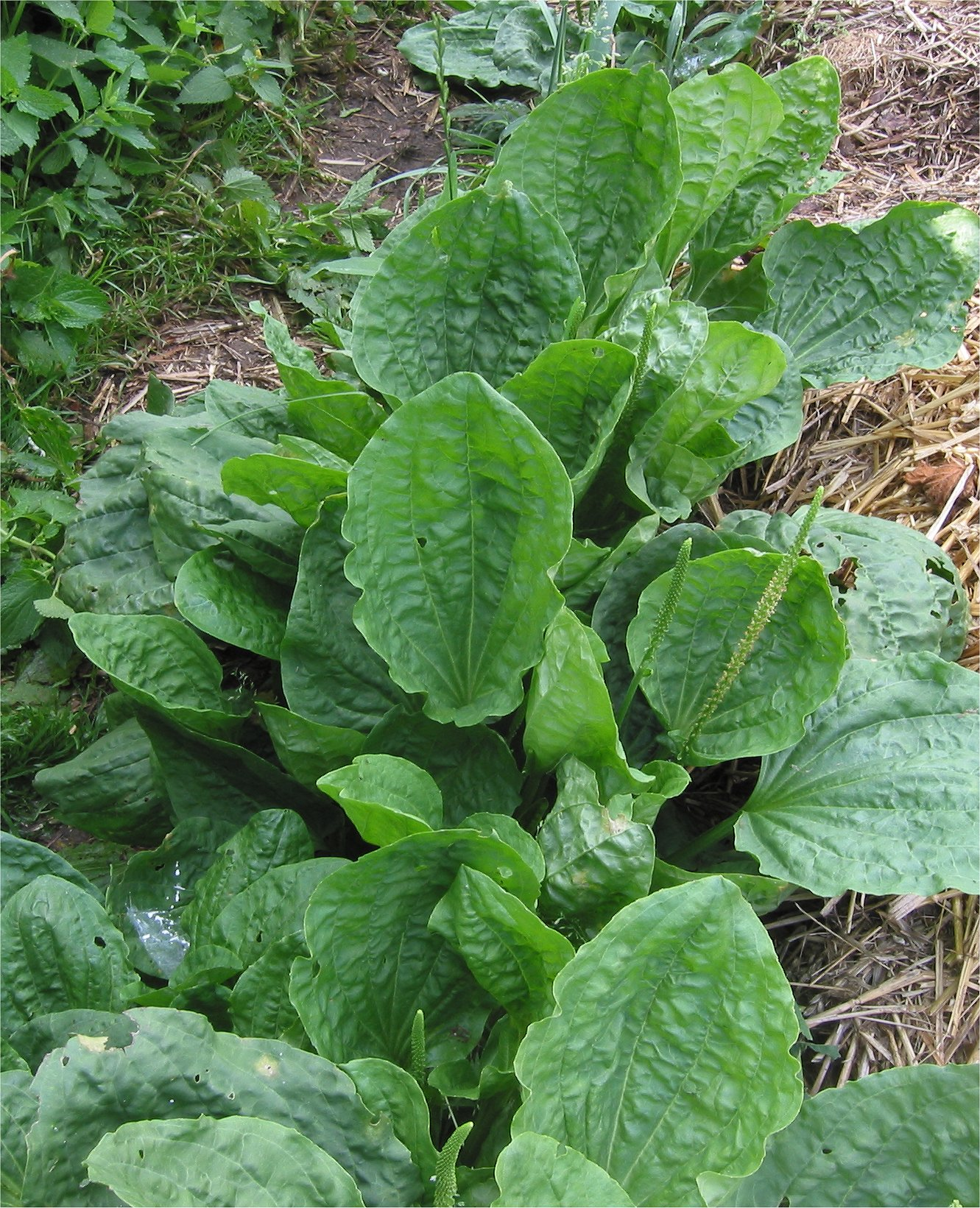
Plantago

==== Plant deterrents to herbivory ====
Because of A. caja’s generalist diet while in the larval stage, it is subject to a wide variety of plant defenses. One study tested plant health with and without beneficial fungus known as Arbuscular mycorrhiza (AM), and saw that Plantago lanceolata with beneficial fungus produce more anti-herbivore toxins, which negatively influenced caterpillar growth. The beneficial fungus gained sugars from the plant, while the plant gained soil nutrients from the fungus, such as phosphorus and nitrogen. Due to the plant-fungus symbiosis, plants were able to produce more toxins than normal due to the fungus’ acquisition of additional usable resources from the soil, and in turn harm the larvae's consumption of leaf matter. The effectiveness of this plant response was tested on several species of Lepidoptera.

=== Adults ===
The imagines do not feed and die after a few days. They draw solely on the energy reserves built up during the larval stage.

== Life cycle ==
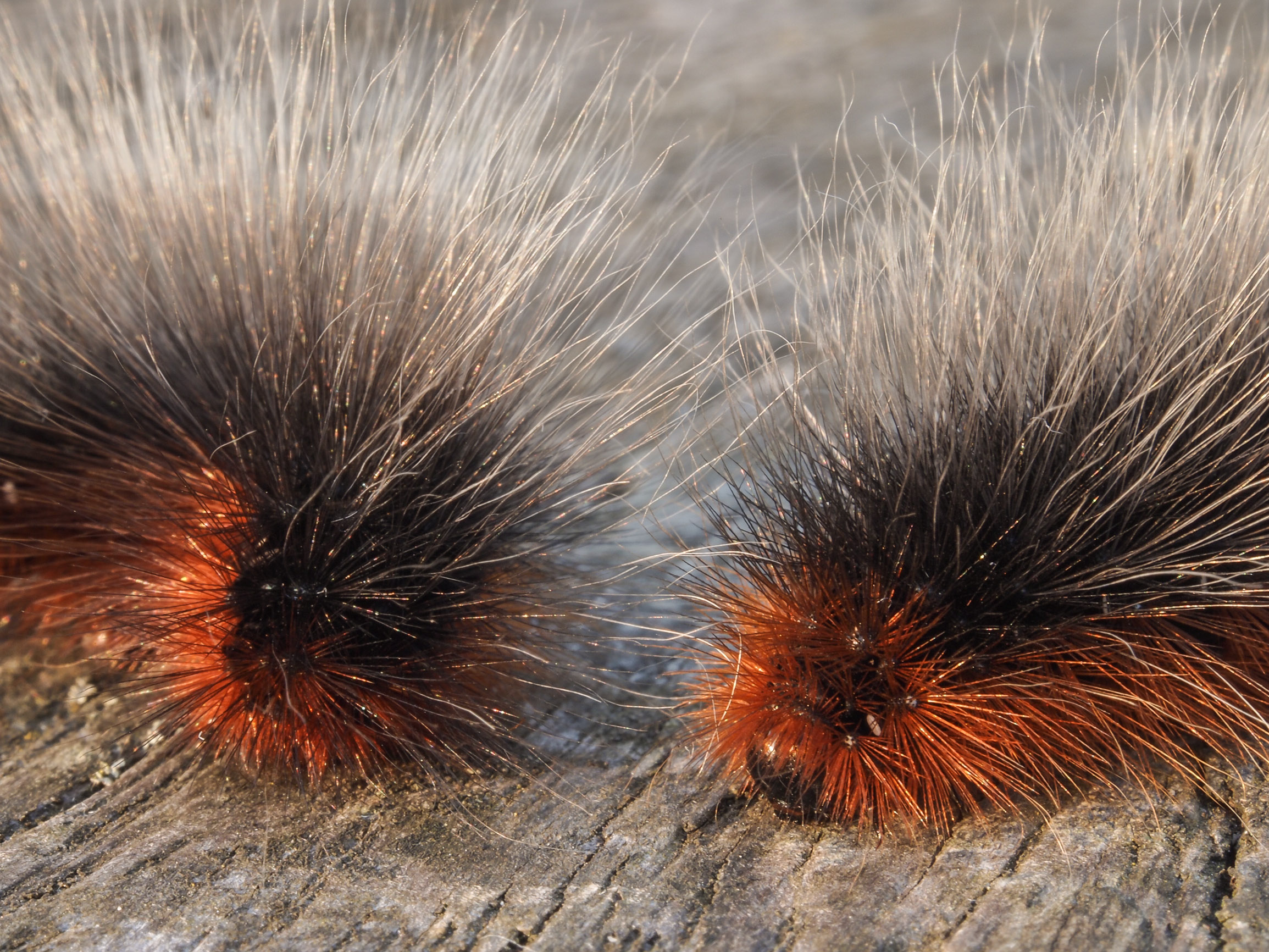
Two garden tiger moth caterpillars

A. caja hatches at the end of summer (from August to September), overwinters once, reemerges in spring, and finishes growth by June. From July to August (or September in warmer climates) the adults are active, primarily at night. Eggs are laid on leaf surfaces and the larvae hatch and feed shortly after the previous generation has died. After feeding for a few months, the larvae go into dormancy while covered in ground matter. In spring, the larvae resume feeding and pupate. By June or July, adults emerge, all from the same generation that was laid in the previous fall. During all life stages there is no generation overlap, either as adults or larvae.

=== Caterpillars ===
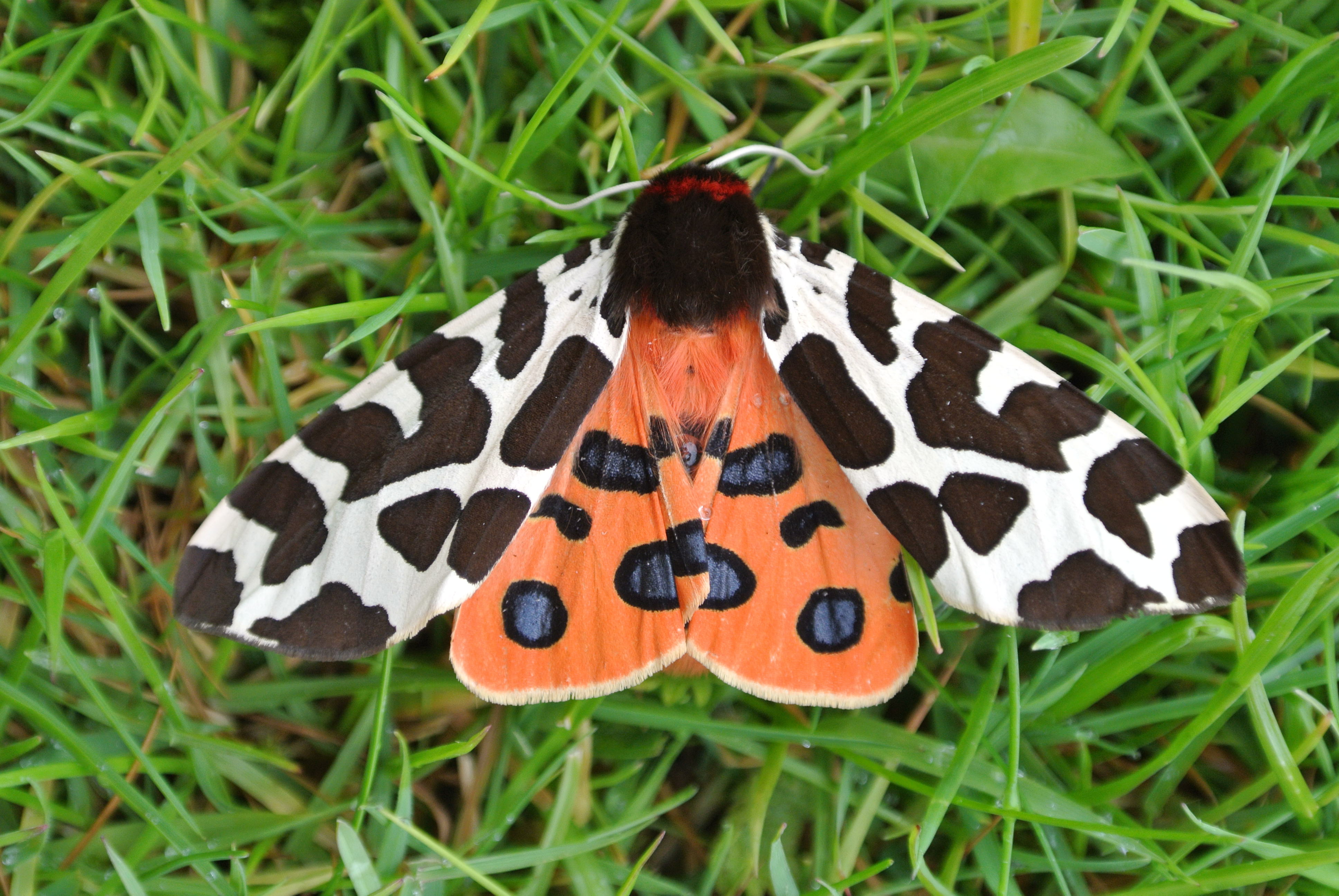
Garden tiger moth

The caterpillars of this species are, like many caterpillars of the tiger moth family, “fuzzy” in appearance, leading them to be called "woolly bears" by casual observers. Once the caterpillars reach a certain size, they acquire hollow tubes that often contain irritating compounds. The larvae depend upon the host plant for their toxic compounds, which they convert from plant defense compounds to larval and adult protection compounds. The caterpillars can grow to a maximum size of 6 cm (2.4 in) long.

=== Adults ===
Adults are active from June to September (or August in more northern climates) predominantly at night. They have red hairs on their cervical regions with glands nearby and patterning across the wings that is meant to warn and advertise toxicity (neurotoxic choline esters).

== Enemies ==
=== Predators ===
While not often eaten due to its toxicity, naïve birds will on rare occasion consume either the adult or larval stages of this species.

=== Parasites ===
The larval form of A. caja is parasitized by quite a few endoparasites, which usually grow as larvae inside the living host (in this case a caterpillar). Examples include:

- Carcelia gnava
- Carcelia lucorum
- Carcelia tibialis
- Compsilura concinnata
- Exorista fasciata
- Exorista grandis
- Hubneria affinis
- Pales pavida
- Thelaira leucozona
- Thelaira nigripes
- Thelymorpha marmorata.

All of the listed species of parasites are flies, and they all parasitize during their larval stages.

== Protective coloration and behavior ==
=== Müllerian ===
Adult garden tiger moths exhibit clear warning signals, which they share with other tiger moths to advertise very real toxicity upon consumption. Adults can also spray an irritating compound when threatened. The chemical, produced in glands that are exposed when threatened, is a choline ester. A similar compound is found in the tissues of the adults, with the eggs, gonads, and abdomens having the highest concentrations.

== Genetics ==
=== Phylogeny ===
Arctia caja is very well adapted to cold temperate climates, and is closely related to many other tiger moths both molecularly and genetically. Although it has variable patterning, it is still quite genetically and molecularly similar to other species that have been separated from A. caja due to appearance, such as A. intercalaris, A. martinhoneyi, A. thibetica, A. brachyptera, and A. opulenta. Evidence for combining some of these species does not seem strong enough to create conclusions in that regard.

== Physiology ==
=== Sound generation ===
Adults can make rasping sounds with their wings and can emit high pitched squeaking sounds that are audible to humans. These sounds have been found to affect bat behavior, as the squeaks of this insect cause bats to avoid the noxious moth. Bats that could associate squeaking or clicking sounds as indicative of toxic prey quickly used sound alone as a deterrent.

=== Digestion ===
The digestion of this species is most remarkable in the larval stage. The host plants of this species almost always carry toxins known as pyrrolizidine alkaloids. To deal with this the caterpillars have developed the capacity to metabolize a wide range of toxins using unique enzymes. These enzymes both convert the plant's toxins into a non-toxic form, but they also allow the larval A. caja to later use these toxins in an altered form for protection.

=== Diapause ===
The larvae of this species overwinter in ground vegetation, and in spring they finish larval development and pupate.

== Conservation ==
The garden tiger moth is now protected in the UK under the Biodiversity Action Plan (BAP). Its numbers in the UK have declined by 89% over the past 30 years. The BAP in 2007 added the garden tiger moth to its list of species in need of habitat protection in light of these recent declines in suitable habitat. The plan aims to provide greater habitat protection and conservation, with the hopes of stabilizing the A. caja populations that remain in the UK.

=== Synthetic food ===
The garden tiger moth population decline is of concern for both laboratory research and in nature. A possible way to combat this in a laboratory setting is to use synthetic food. While not ideal, it resolves many issues that arise when trying to raise captive Lepidoptera. Concerns such as food sterility are quickly resolved, along with issues of gathering hard to find or cultivate host plant material. Many larvae, including those of A. caja, can consume synthetic food, which is based primarily on agar, powdered cellulose, cabbage, sucrose, salts, and wheat germ. Synthetic options appear to be a promising way to raise lab populations of this species, for conservation or for study.
