= Thelaira americana =

Scientific classification
- Kingdom: Animalia
- Phylum: Arthropoda
- Class: Insecta
- Order: Diptera
- Family: Tachinidae
- Subfamily: Dexiinae
- Tribe: Voriini
- Genus: Thelaira
- Species: T. americana

Binomial name
- Thelaira americana Brooks, 1945

Species of fly

Thelaira americana is a species of fly in the family Tachinidae.

== Distribution ==
Canada, United States, Mexico.
