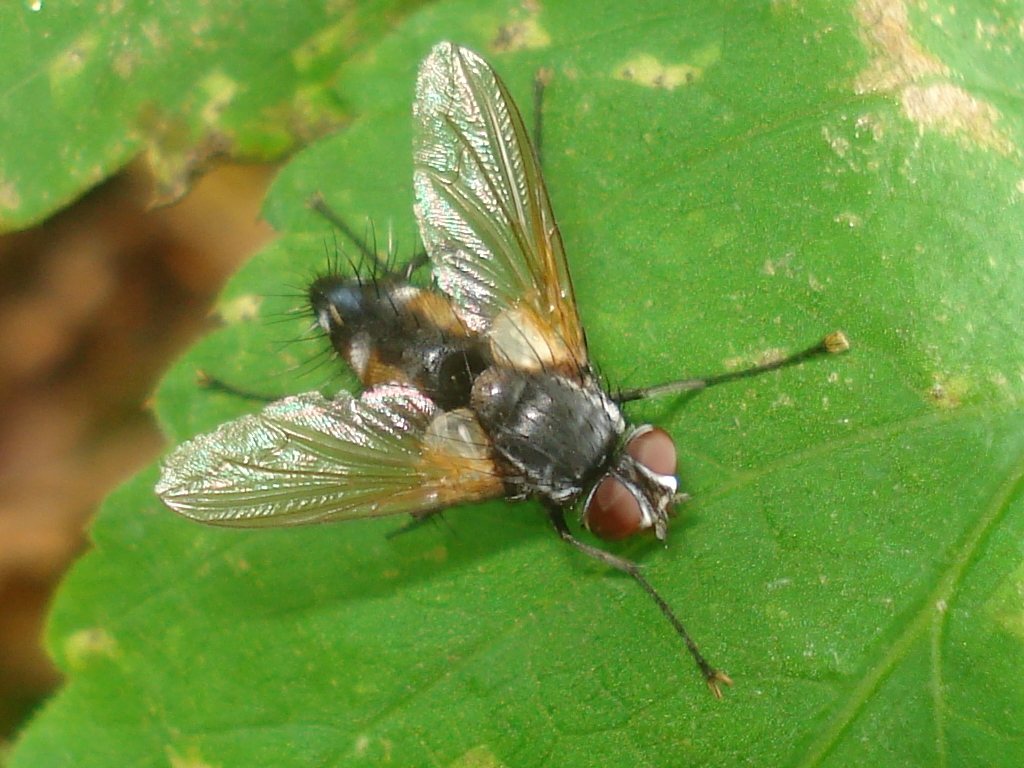
- Thelaira nigripes

Scientific classification
- Kingdom: Animalia
- Phylum: Arthropoda
- Class: Insecta
- Order: Diptera
- Family: Tachinidae
- Subfamily: Dexiinae
- Tribe: Voriini
- Genus: Thelaira; Robineau-Desvoidy, 1830

Type species
- Thelaira abdominalis Robineau-Desvoidy, 1830

Synonyms
- Ochroplevrum Macquart, 1851; Phenicellia Robineau-Desvoidy, 1863; Phoenicella Mik & Wachtl, 1895; Tachinella Portschinsky, 1881; Telaira Rondani, 1862; Thelairia Coquillett, 1910; Thilaira Walker, 1849

= Thelaira =

Genus of flies

Thelaira is a genus of flies in the family Tachinidae.

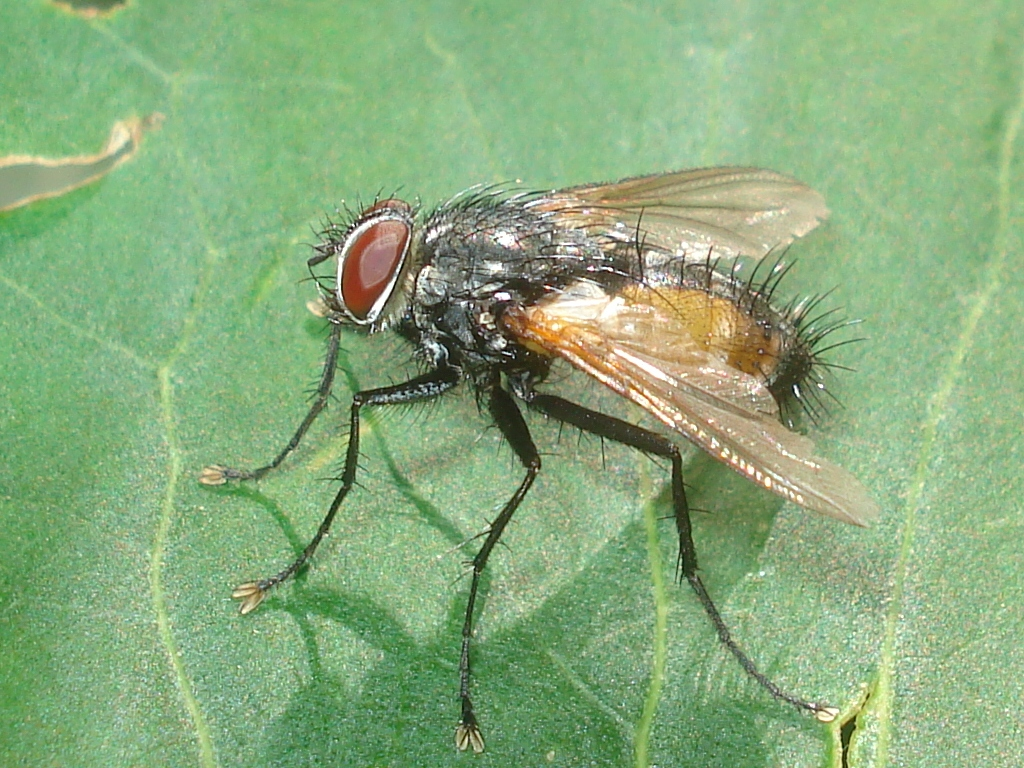
Thelaira solivaga

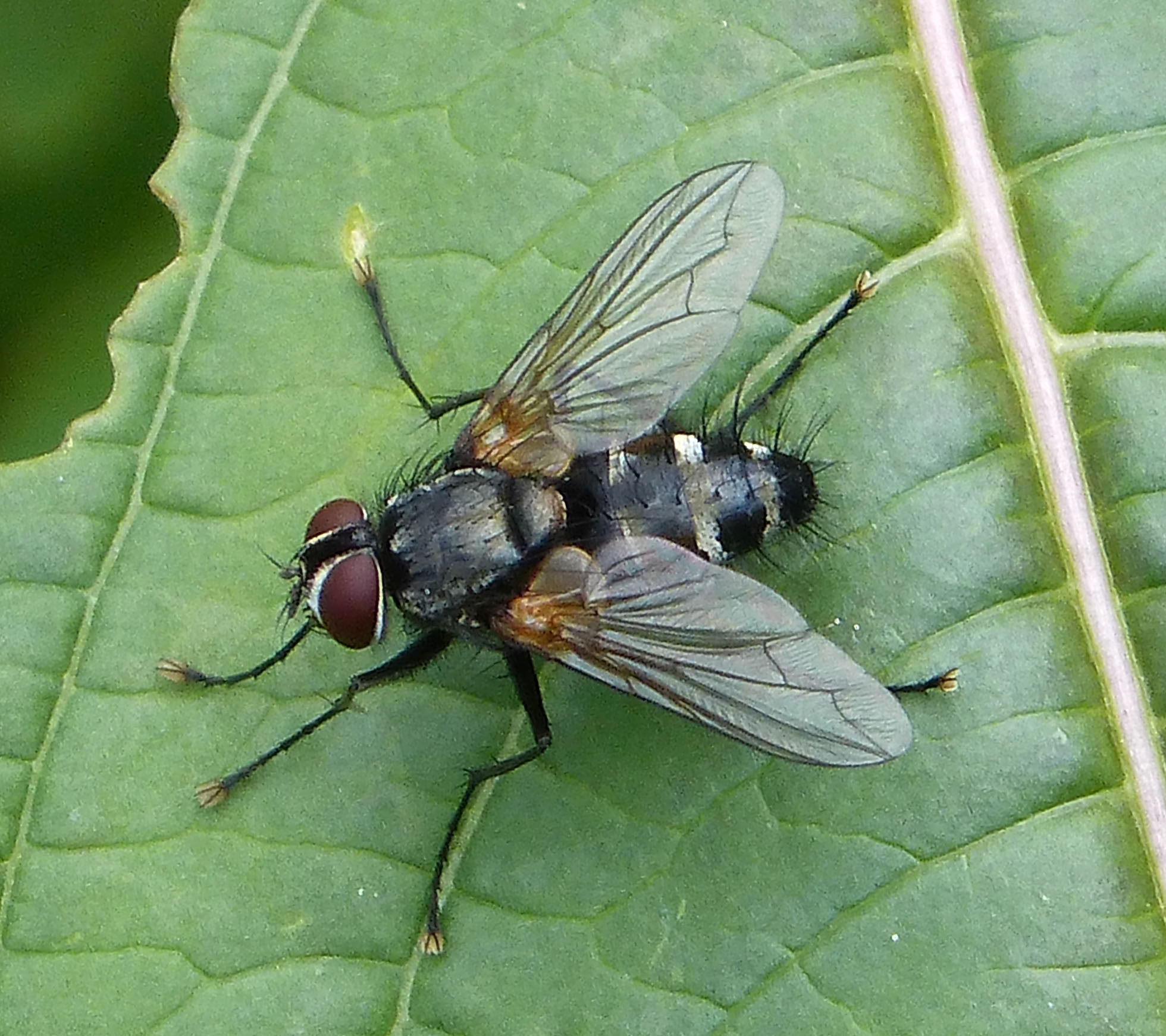
Thelaira nigripes

== Species ==
- Thelaira altoplani Speiser, 1914
- Thelaira americana Brooks, 1945
- Thelaira aurofasciata Emden, 1960
- Thelaira australis (Walker, 1853)
- Thelaira bryanti Curran, 1925
- Thelaira chrysopruinosa Chao & Shi, 1985
- Thelaira claritriangla Chao & Zhou, 1993
- Thelaira ghanii Mesnil, 1968
- Thelaira haematodes (Meigen, 1824)
- Thelaira hohxilica Chao & Zhou, 1996
- Thelaira leucozona (Meigen & Panzer, 1806)
- Thelaira luteiventris Emden, 1960
- Thelaira macropus (Wiedemann, 1830)
- Thelaira madecassa Mesnil, 1978
- Thelaira medvedevi Richter, 2004
- Thelaira nigripes (Fabricius, 1794)
- Thelaira occelaris Chao & Shi, 1985
- Thelaira solivaga (Harris, 1780)
- Thelaira sumatrana Townsend, 1927
