= Ptilodexia strenua =

Scientific classification
- Kingdom: Animalia
- Phylum: Arthropoda
- Clade: Pancrustacea
- Class: Insecta
- Order: Diptera
- Family: Tachinidae
- Subfamily: Dexiinae
- Tribe: Dexiini
- Genus: Ptilodexia
- Species: P. strenua

Binomial name
- Ptilodexia strenua (Robineau-Desvoidy, 1830)

Synonyms
- Zelia strenua Robineau-Desvoidy, 1830

Species of fly

Ptilodexia strenua is a species of fly in the family Tachinidae.

== Distribution ==
P. strenua is found in Haiti and Puerto Rico.
