= Thelaira leucozona =

Scientific classification
- Kingdom: Animalia
- Phylum: Arthropoda
- Class: Insecta
- Order: Diptera
- Family: Tachinidae
- Subfamily: Dexiinae
- Tribe: Voriini
- Genus: Thelaira
- Species: T. leucozona

Binomial name
- Thelaira leucozona (Meigen & Panzer, 1806)

Synonyms
- Musca leucozona Meigen & Panzer, 1806; Musca lucozona Sherborn, 1922; Thelaira valida Robineau-Desvoidy, 1863

Species of fly

Thelaira leucozona is a species of fly in the family Tachinidae first described by Georg Wolfgang Franz Panzer in 1806. It parasitizes moths such as Arctia caja by laying eggs in the larvae that eventually kill the host.

== Distribution ==
Great Britain, Czech Republic, Hungary, Latvia, Poland, Bulgaria, Italy, Serbia, Austria, France, Germany, Switzerland, Japan, Russia, Transcaucasia, China.
