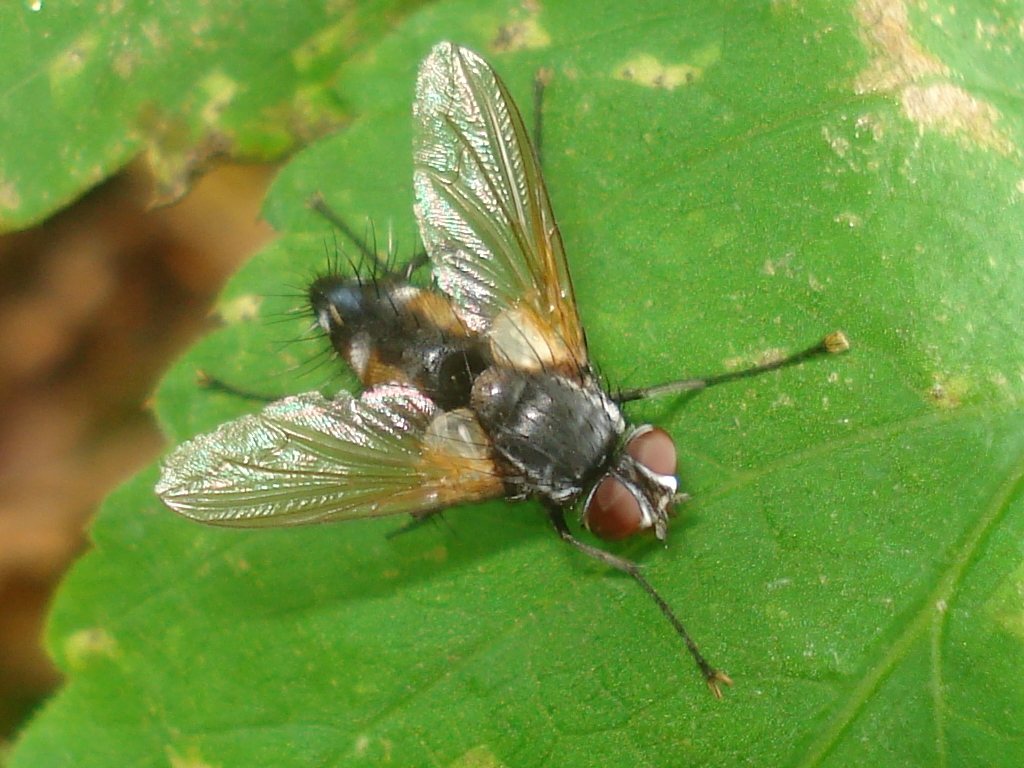

Scientific classification
- Kingdom: Animalia
- Phylum: Arthropoda
- Class: Insecta
- Order: Diptera
- Family: Tachinidae
- Subfamily: Dexiinae
- Tribe: Voriini
- Genus: Thelaira
- Species: T. nigripes

Binomial name
- Thelaira nigripes (Fallén, 1817)

Synonyms
- Dexia albifrons Stephens, 1829; Musca nigrina Fallén, 1817; Musca nigripes Fabricius, 1794; Thelaira albifrons (Stephens, 1829); Thelaira nigripes (Fabricius, 1794); Admontia cepelaki (Mesnil, 1961)

= Thelaira nigripes =

Species of fly

Thelaira nigripes is a species of fly in the family Tachinidae first described by Carl Fredrik Fallén in 1817. It parasitizes moths such as Arctia caja by laying eggs in the larvae that eventually kill the host.

== Distribution ==
British Isles, Czech Republic, Estonia, Hungary, Latvia, Lithuania, Moldova, Poland, Romania, Slovakia, Ukraine, Denmark, Finland, Norway, Sweden, Bulgaria, Croatia, Greece, Italy, Macedonia, Portugal, Serbia, Slovenia, Spain, Austria, Belgium, Channel Islands, France, Germany, Netherlands, Switzerland, Japan, North Korea, South Korea, Iran, Russia, Transcaucasia, China, Japan, Taiwan.
