= Ptilodexia rufipennis =

Scientific classification
- Kingdom: Animalia
- Phylum: Arthropoda
- Class: Insecta
- Order: Diptera
- Family: Tachinidae
- Subfamily: Dexiinae
- Tribe: Dexiini
- Genus: Ptilodexia
- Species: P. rufipennis

Binomial name
- Ptilodexia rufipennis (Macquart, 1844)

Synonyms
- Dexia albifrons Walker, 1853; Dexia cerata Walker, 1849; Dexia rufipennis Macquart, 1844; Rhynchiodexia dubia Curran, 1930; Rhynchodexia confusa West, 1924; Rhynchodexia translucipennis West, 1925

Species of fly

Ptilodexia rufipennis is a species of bristle fly in the family Tachinidae.

== Distribution ==
Canada, United States.
