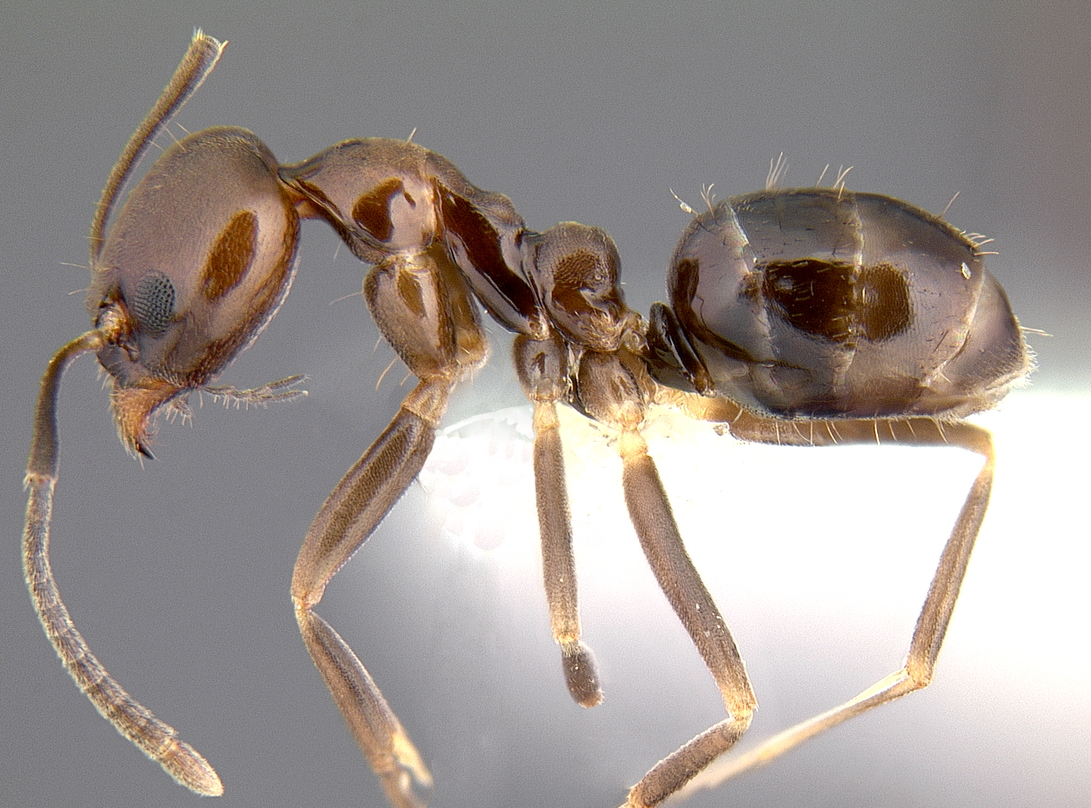

Scientific classification
- Domain: Eukaryota
- Kingdom: Animalia
- Phylum: Arthropoda
- Class: Insecta
- Order: Hymenoptera
- Family: Formicidae
- Subfamily: Dolichoderinae
- Genus: Linepithema
- Species: L. iniquum

Binomial name
- Linepithema iniquum (Mayr, 1870)

Synonyms
- Iridomyrmex iniquus bicolor Forel, 1912; Iridomyrmex iniquus nigellus Emery, 1890; Iridomyrmex melleus Wheeler, W.M., 1908; Iridomyrmex melleus dominicensis Wheeler, W.M., 1913; Iridomyrmex melleus fuscescens Wheeler, W.M., 1908; Iridomyrmex melleus succineus Forel, 1908

= Linepithema iniquum =

Species of ant

Linepithema iniquum is a species of ant in the genus Linepithema. Described by Mayr in 1870, the species is endemic to South America and invasive in Europe.
