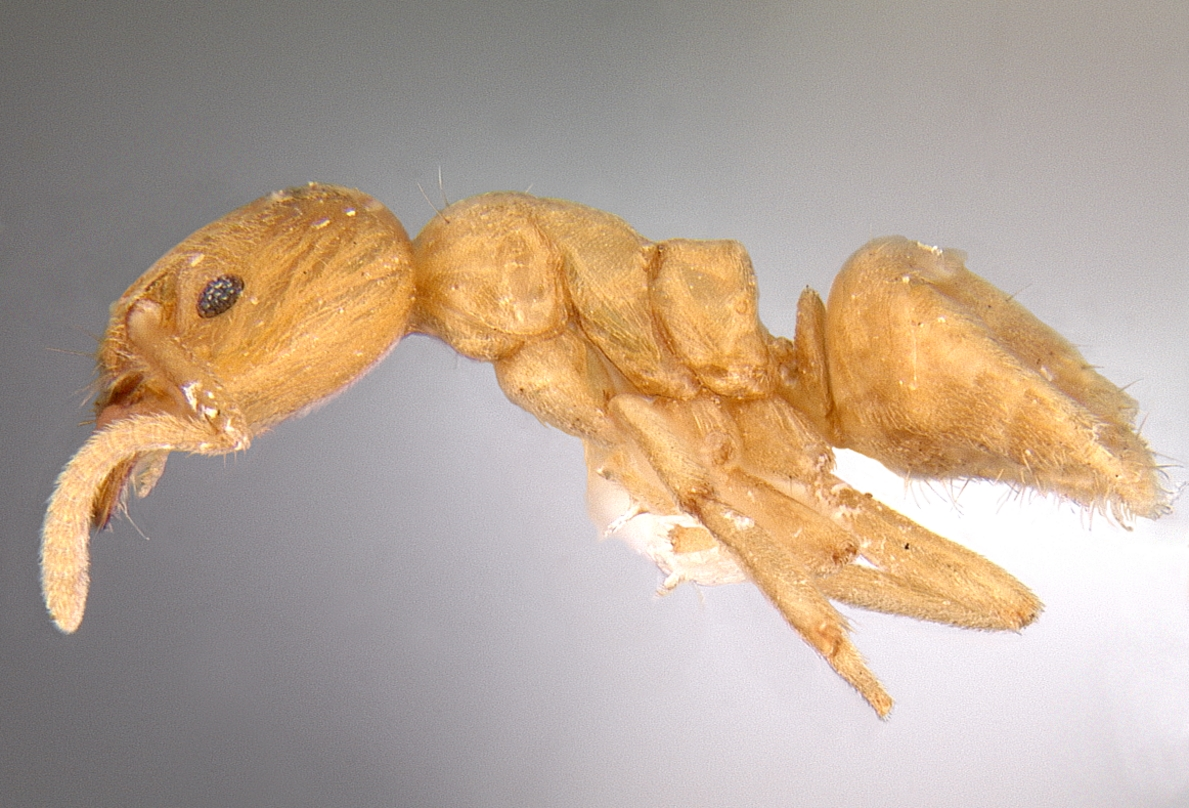

Scientific classification
- Domain: Eukaryota
- Kingdom: Animalia
- Phylum: Arthropoda
- Class: Insecta
- Order: Hymenoptera
- Family: Formicidae
- Subfamily: Dolichoderinae
- Genus: Linepithema
- Species: L. cryptobioticum

Binomial name
- Linepithema cryptobioticum Wild, 2007

= Linepithema cryptobioticum =

South American species of ant

Linepithema cryptobioticum is a species of ant in the genus Linepithema. Described by Wild in 2007, the species is endemic to South America.
