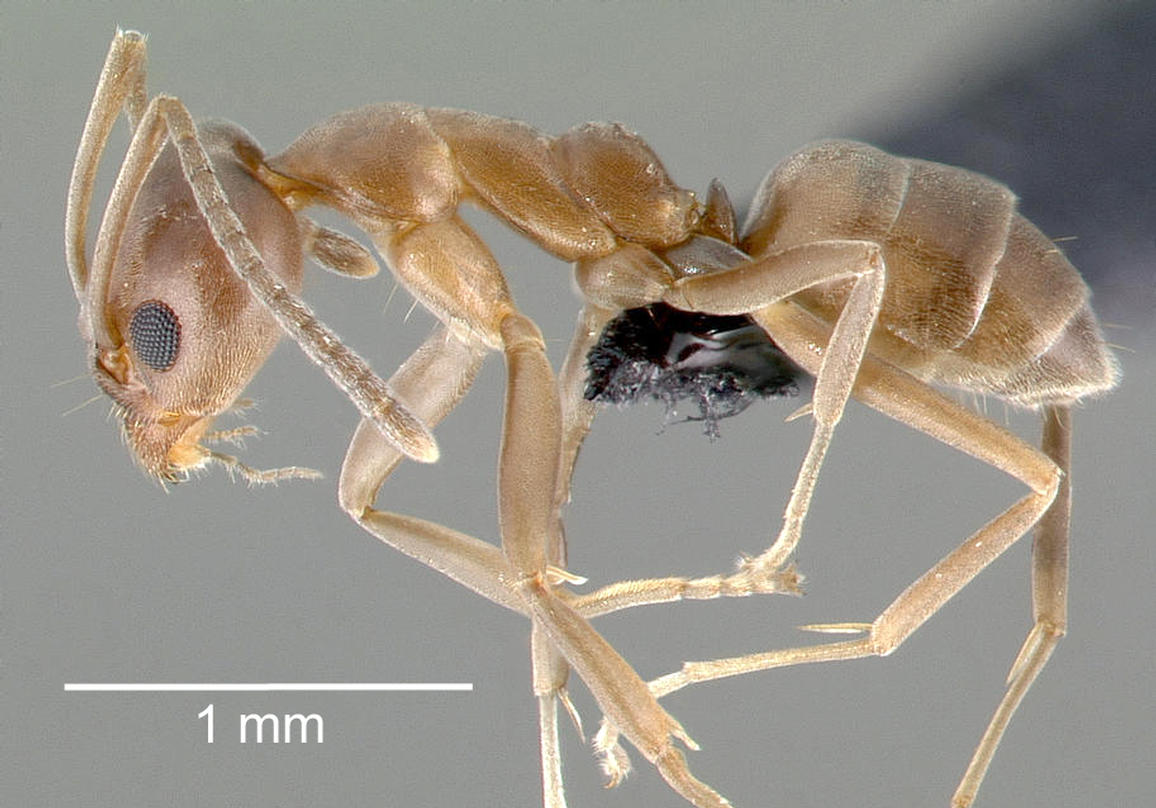
- Linepithema humile (Argentine ant) worker from California

Scientific classification
- Kingdom: Animalia
- Phylum: Arthropoda
- Clade: Pancrustacea
- Class: Insecta
- Order: Hymenoptera
- Family: Formicidae
- Subfamily: Dolichoderinae
- Tribe: Leptomyrmecini
- Genus: Linepithema; Mayr, 1866

Type species
- Linepithema fuscum Mayr, 1866

Diversity
- 20 species

= Linepithema =

Genus of ants

Linepithema is a genus of small ants in the subfamily Dolichoderinae.

== Distribution ==
Their native distribution ranges from northern Mexico, east into the Caribbean, and south into northern Argentina. Two species have been spread around the world by human activities: L. iniquum and L. humile. The latter is better known as the Argentine ant, an invasive species with notable presence in Mediterranean climates. Linepithema species are found from sea level and up to 4,000 meters above sea level in the Andes.

== Species ==
- Linepithema anathema (Wild, 2007)
- Linepithema angulatum (Emery, 1894)
- Linepithema aztecoides (Wild, 2007)
- Linepithema cerradense (Wild, 2007)
- Linepithema cryptobioticum (Wild, 2007)
- Linepithema dispertitum (Forel, 1885)
- Linepithema flavescens (Wheeler & Mann, 1914)
- Linepithema fuscum (Mayr, 1866)
- Linepithema gallardoi (Brèthes, 1914)
- Linepithema humile (Mayr, 1868)
- Linepithema inacatum (Bolton, 1995)
- Linepithema iniquum (Mayr, 1870)
- Linepithema keiteli (Forel, 1907)
- Linepithema leucomelas (Emery, 1894)
- Linepithema micans (Forel, 1908)
- Linepithema neotropicum (Wild, 2007)
- Linepithema oblongum (Santschi, 1929)
- Linepithema piliferum (Mayr, 1870)
- Linepithema pulex (Wild, 2007)
- Linepithema tsachila (Wild, 2007)
