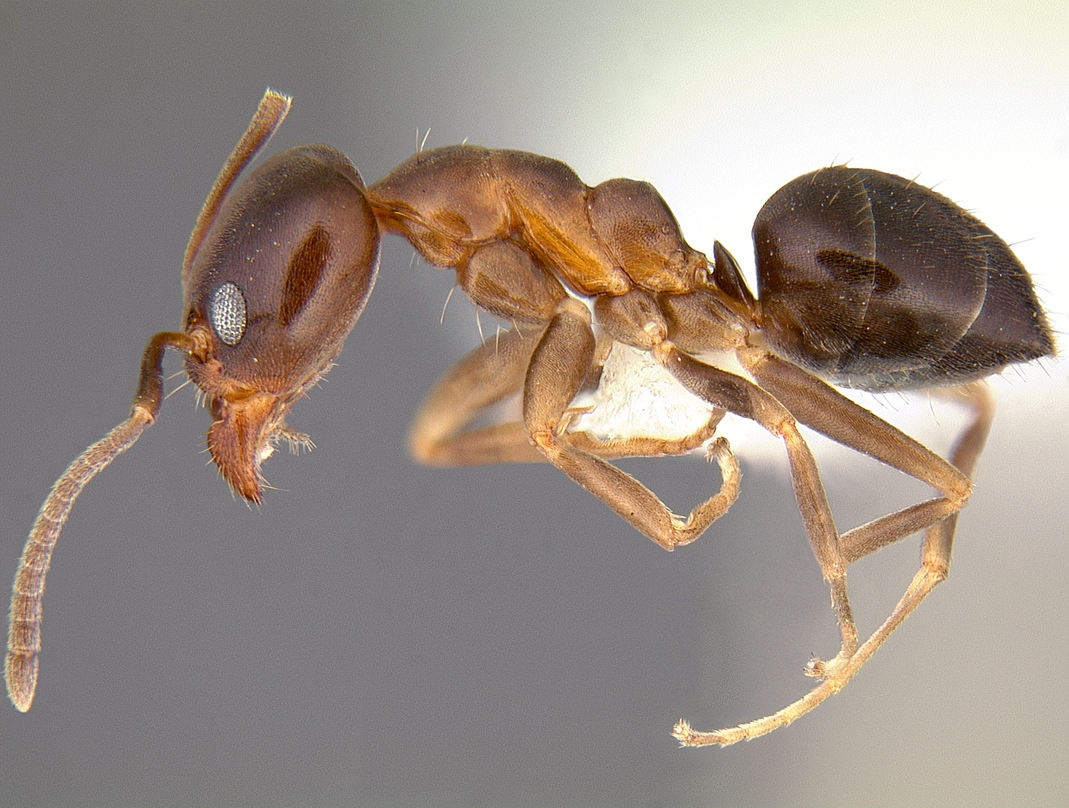

Scientific classification
- Domain: Eukaryota
- Kingdom: Animalia
- Phylum: Arthropoda
- Class: Insecta
- Order: Hymenoptera
- Family: Formicidae
- Subfamily: Dolichoderinae
- Genus: Linepithema
- Species: L. gallardoi

Binomial name
- Linepithema gallardoi (Brèthes, 1914)

Synonyms
- Iridomyrmex humilis breviscapa Santschi, 1929; Iridomyrmex impotens Santschi, 1923

= Linepithema gallardoi =

Species of ant

Linepithema gallardoi is a species of ant in the genus Linepithema. Described by Juan Brèthes in 1914, the species is endemic to South America.
