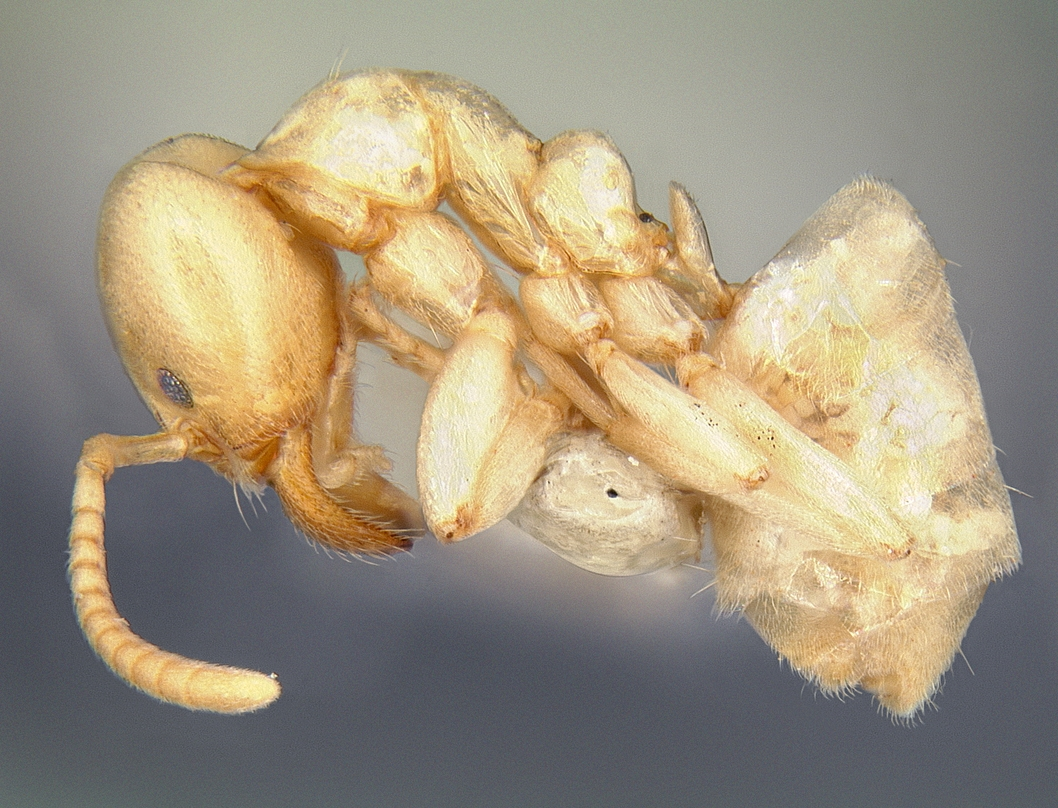

Conservation status
- Data Deficient (IUCN 3.1)

Scientific classification
- Kingdom: Animalia
- Phylum: Arthropoda
- Class: Insecta
- Order: Hymenoptera
- Family: Formicidae
- Subfamily: Dolichoderinae
- Genus: Linepithema
- Species: L. flavescens

Binomial name
- Linepithema flavescens (Wheeler, W.M. & Mann, 1914)

= Linepithema flavescens =

Species of ant

Linepithema flavescens is a species of ant in the genus Linepithema. Described by William Morton Wheeler and Mann in 1914, the species is endemic to Haiti.
