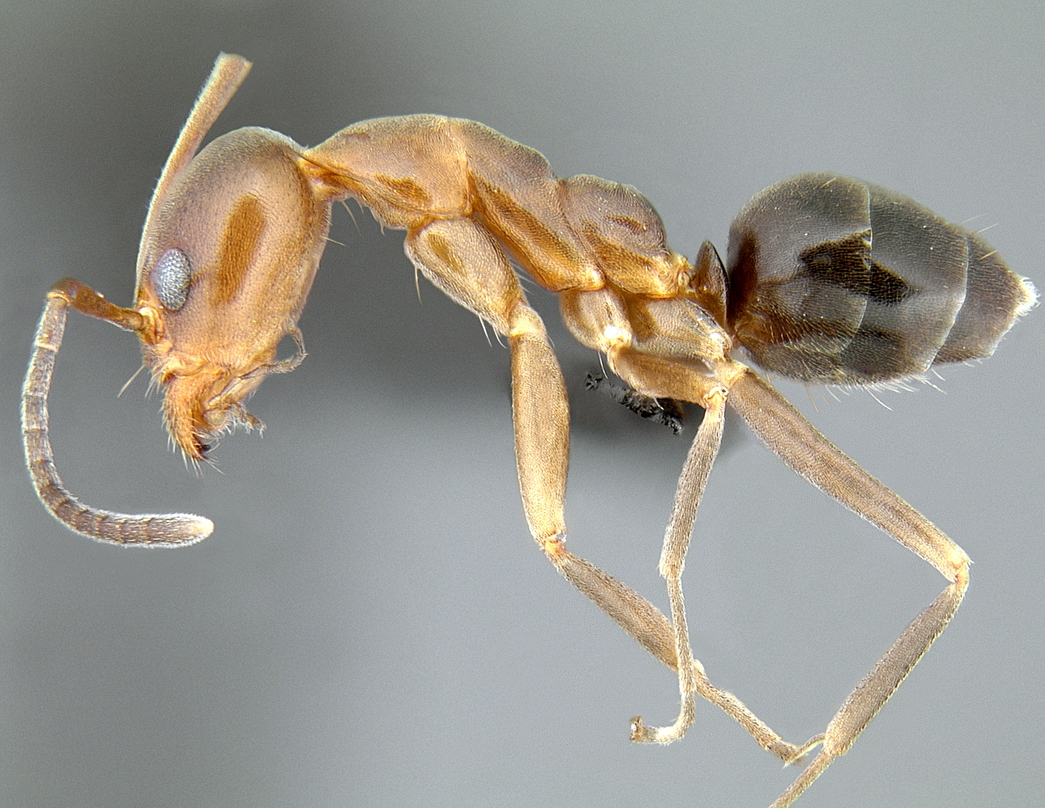

Scientific classification
- Domain: Eukaryota
- Kingdom: Animalia
- Phylum: Arthropoda
- Class: Insecta
- Order: Hymenoptera
- Family: Formicidae
- Subfamily: Dolichoderinae
- Genus: Linepithema
- Species: L. oblongum

Binomial name
- Linepithema oblongum (Santschi, 1929)

= Linepithema oblongum =

Species of ant

Linepithema oblongum is a species of ant in the genus Linepithema. Described by Santschi in 1929, the species is endemic to South America.
