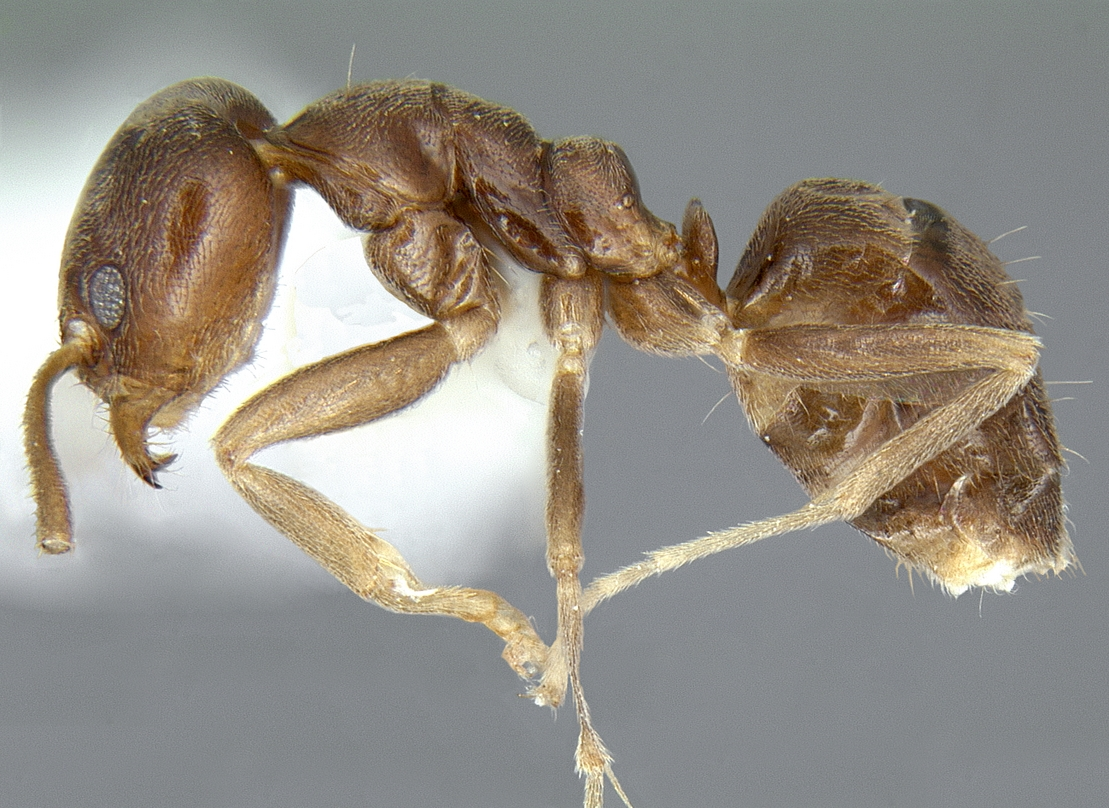

Scientific classification
- Kingdom: Animalia
- Phylum: Arthropoda
- Clade: Pancrustacea
- Class: Insecta
- Order: Hymenoptera
- Family: Formicidae
- Subfamily: Dolichoderinae
- Genus: Linepithema
- Species: L. fuscum

Binomial name
- Linepithema fuscum Mayr, 1866

= Linepithema fuscum =

Species of ant

Linepithema fuscum is a species of ant in the genus Linepithema. Described by Mayr in 1866, the species is endemic to South America. Linepithema fucsum was the first species-level name assigned to genus Linepithema by Mayr. It is related to L. angulatum, L. keiteli, L. piliferum and L. tsachila. However, only Linepithema fuscum remains without a worker association and it could be possible that males of Linepithema fuscum actually belong to the workers of L. angulatum. Little is known about Linepithema fuscum due to the scarcity of the collected samples.

== Taxonomy ==
In 1866, Mayr first described Linepithema fuscum and 28 species-level names have been assigned to the genus Linepithema ever since. However, species limit within Linepithema is poorly understood and there haven't been efforts to synthesize the isolated description of the species into one coherent taxonomy. The description of Linepithema fuscum was initially based on a male species description by Mayr. Shattuck later cited the male morphology difference in his phylogenetic research to propose two different species groups of L.. fuscum and L. humile in the genus Linepithema.

== Distribution ==
Linepithema fuscum is native to Argentina, Ecuador, Peru, and Venezuela. But they have been also found in the Colombian inter-Andean valley.

== Description ==
Little is known about the biology of L. fuscum. The species has been collected from 200 to nearly 3000 meters in elevation. One sample was collected from a "shrubby pasture" and another sample was collected inside a laboratory building in Madre de Dios in Peru. From the 2 samples, the researchers were able to determine the haploid chromosome number to be N=9 but could not find other differences.

=== Castes ===
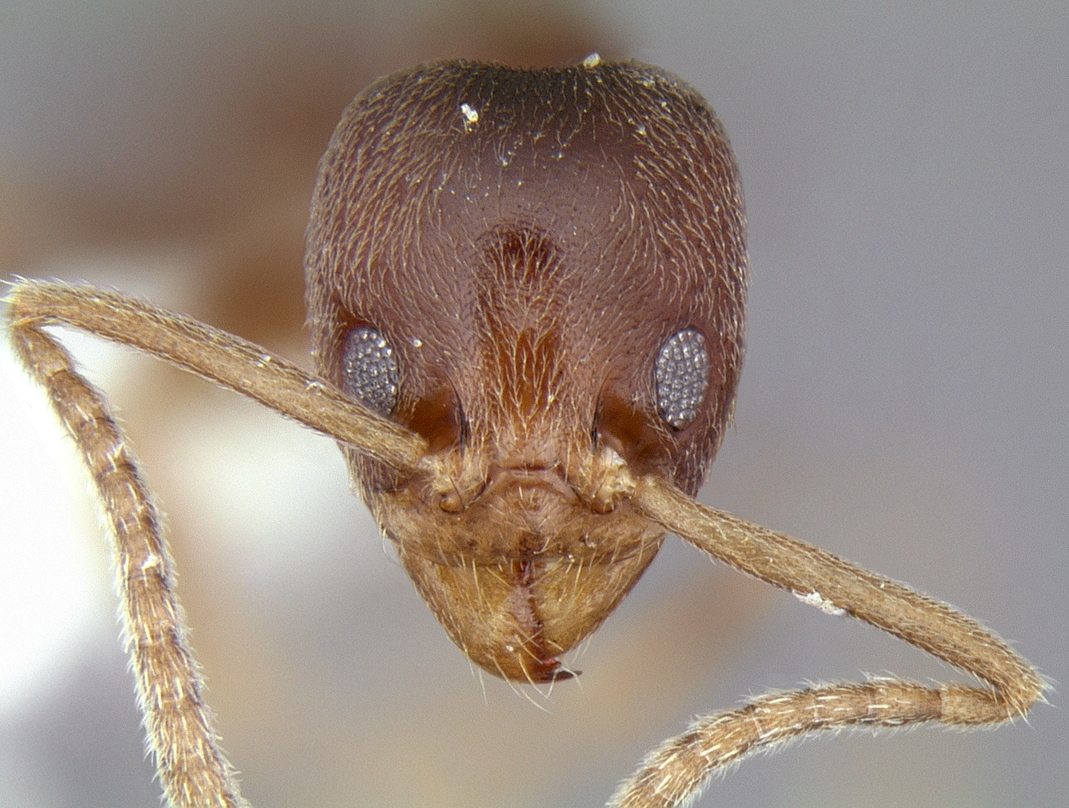
Head view of Linepithema fuscum

Little is known about the caste system of L. fuscum. Similar to most ant species, the caste system consists of workers, male, and a queen.

=== Males ===
Compared to other species in the Linepithema genus, males of L. fuscum have a smaller, more rounded propodeum with a straight to the convex posterior face. Furthermore, the wing venation pattern of the males is similar to that of the queens and consists of two elongate submarginal cells. This is in contrast to other males in the Linepithema genus which have only one submarginal cell. The volsella, a male reproductive appendage, is strongly extruding in L. fuscum males.

The leg of the males is relatively short compared to other species (<70 mm). The head, body, and appendages of the male are medium brown in color.

=== Workers ===
Smaller in size. Some of the key characteristics useful for diagnosis of L. fuscum workers include sparse to absent metapleural pubescence, variable propodeal shape, 0–9 standing setae, and well-developed pre-sutural clypeal groove. The color of the body is medium brown to dark brown but mandibles, antennae, trochanters, and tarsi are somewhat lighter.

=== Queen ===
Moderately sized species (maximum mesosomal length: 1.87–1.91 mm). It is unknown if the queen has wings or not. Some of the key characteristics useful for diagnosis of the queen include mesoscutum with more than 10 standing setae, medium brown body color with lighter colored antennal scapes, legs, and mandibles.
