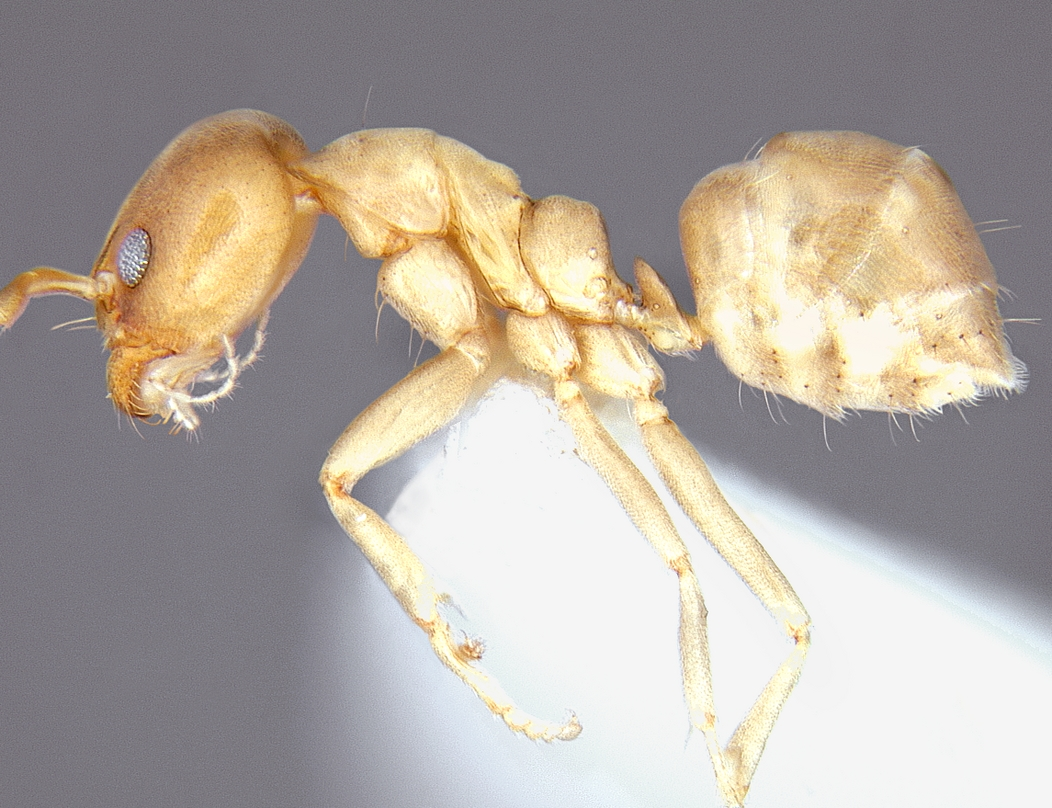

Scientific classification
- Domain: Eukaryota
- Kingdom: Animalia
- Phylum: Arthropoda
- Class: Insecta
- Order: Hymenoptera
- Family: Formicidae
- Subfamily: Dolichoderinae
- Genus: Linepithema
- Species: L. angulatum

Binomial name
- Linepithema angulatum (Emery, 1894)

Synonyms
- Iridomyrmex pordescens Wheeler, W.M., 1942

= Linepithema angulatum =

Species of ant

Linepithema angulatum is a species of ant in the genus Linepithema. Described by Carlo Emery in 1894, the species is endemic to South America.
