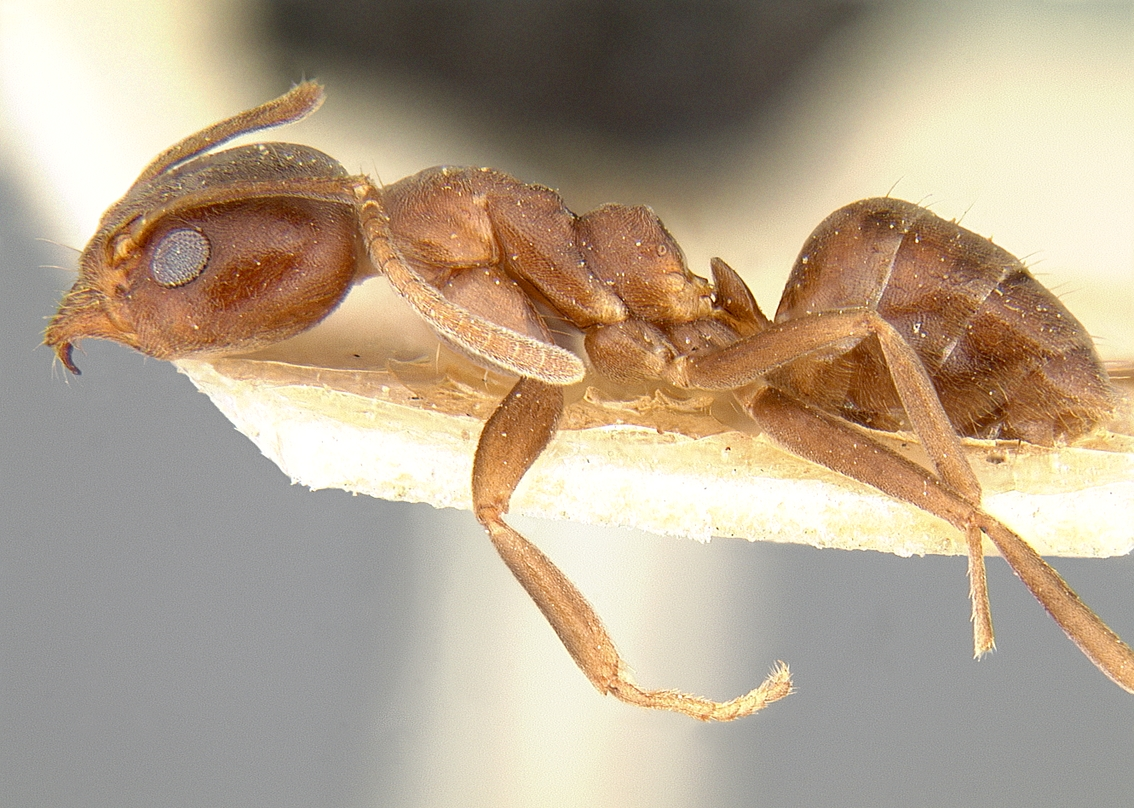

Scientific classification
- Domain: Eukaryota
- Kingdom: Animalia
- Phylum: Arthropoda
- Class: Insecta
- Order: Hymenoptera
- Family: Formicidae
- Subfamily: Dolichoderinae
- Genus: Linepithema
- Species: L. micans

Binomial name
- Linepithema micans (Forel, 1908)

Synonyms
- Iridomyrmex humilis platensis Forel, 1912; Iridomyrmex humilis scotti Santschi, 1919

= Linepithema micans =

Species of ant

Linepithema micans is a small species of ant from the genus Linepithema which was described by Auguste-Henri Forel in 1908. This ant is endemic to southern South America. In Brazil, it is considered a pest of vineyards in acting as the main species associated with the coccid Eurhizococcus brasiliensis (Wille, 1922) (Hemiptera: Margarodidae). It is still a poorly studied species. Their abundant larvae are round and whitish, almost indistinguishable from the proximate species Linepithema humile, better known as the invasive Argentine ant.
