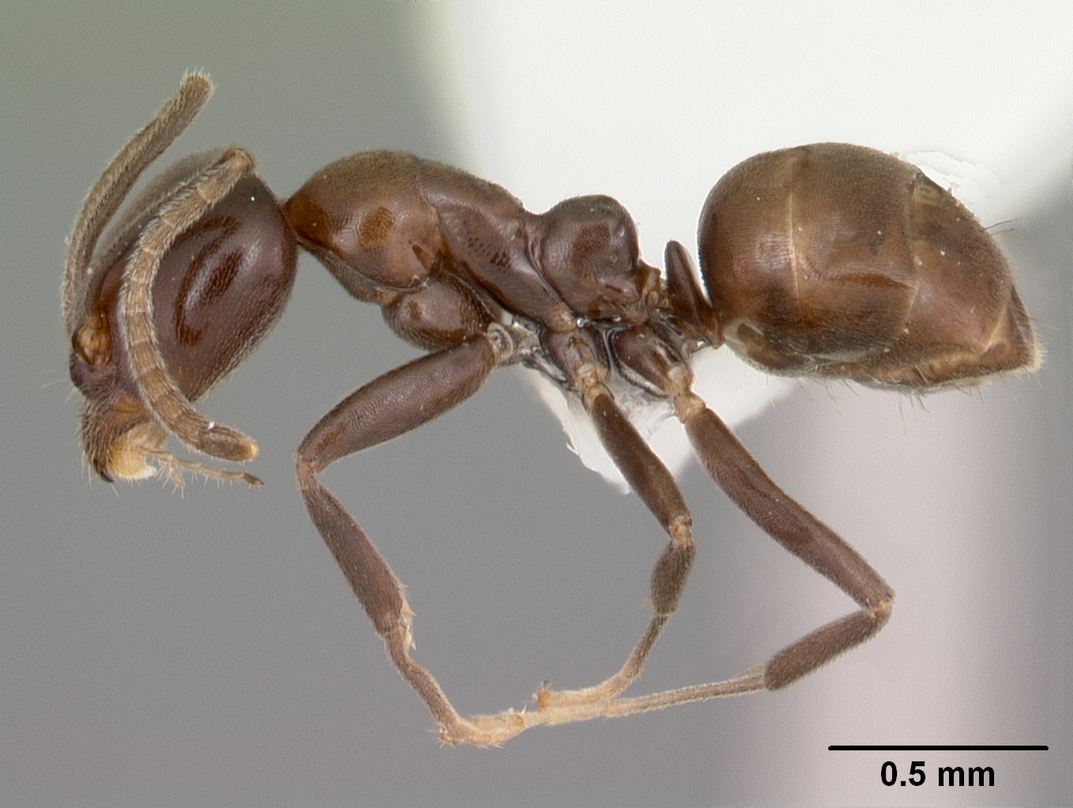

Scientific classification
- Domain: Eukaryota
- Kingdom: Animalia
- Phylum: Arthropoda
- Class: Insecta
- Order: Hymenoptera
- Family: Formicidae
- Subfamily: Dolichoderinae
- Genus: Linepithema
- Species: L. dispertitum

Binomial name
- Linepithema dispertitum (Forel, 1885)

= Linepithema dispertitum =

Species of ant

Linepithema dispertitum is a species of ant in the genus Linepithema. Described by Auguste-Henri Forel in 1885, the species is endemic to South America.
