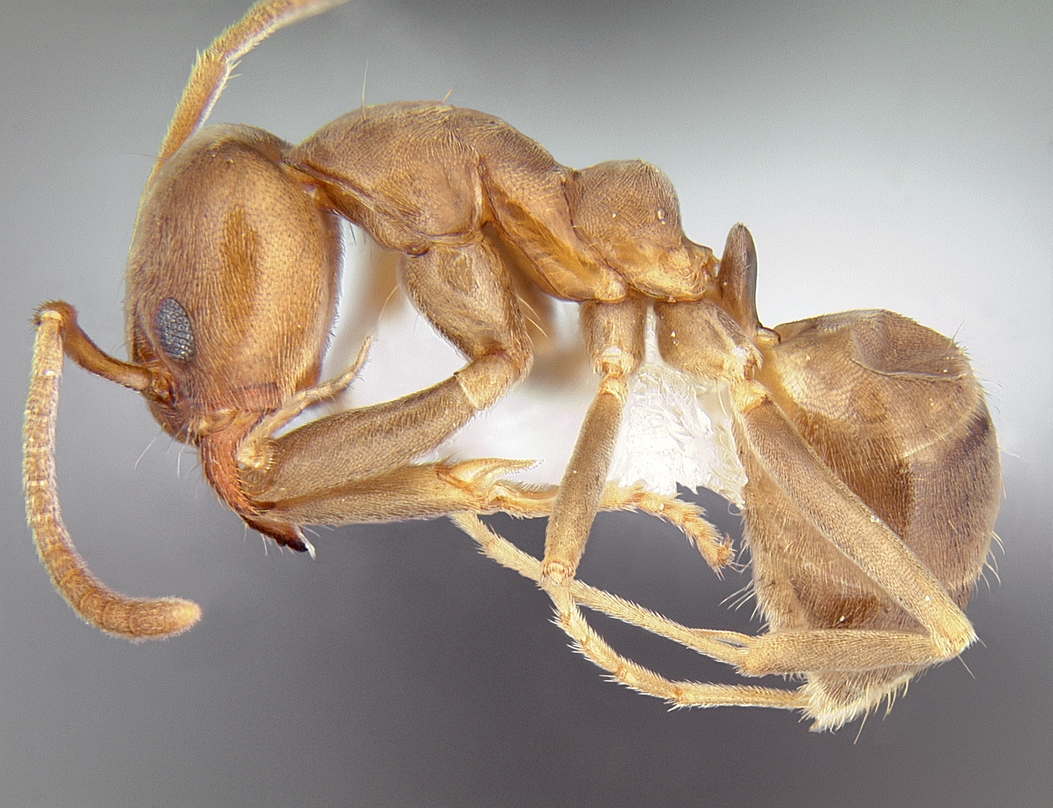

Scientific classification
- Kingdom: Animalia
- Phylum: Arthropoda
- Clade: Pancrustacea
- Class: Insecta
- Order: Hymenoptera
- Family: Formicidae
- Subfamily: Dolichoderinae
- Genus: Linepithema
- Species: L. piliferum

Binomial name
- Linepithema piliferum (Mayr, 1870)

= Linepithema piliferum =

Species of ant

Linepithema piliferum is a species of ant in the genus Linepithema. Described by Mayr in 1870, the species is endemic to the mountains of Northwestern South America, to Costa Rica

The colonies contain multiple queens and multiple nests. A nest excavation in Ecuador in 2002 revealed that, "at least one nest contained a colony of root aphids feeding on grass roots growing through the nest."
