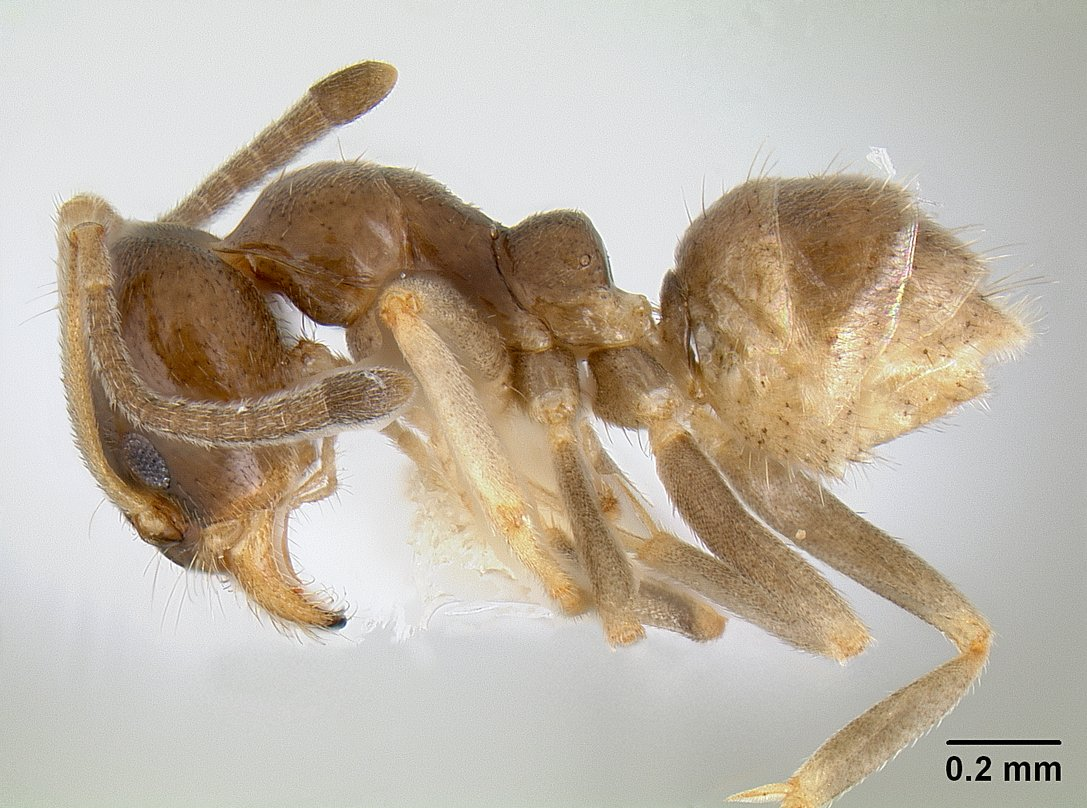

Scientific classification
- Domain: Eukaryota
- Kingdom: Animalia
- Phylum: Arthropoda
- Class: Insecta
- Order: Hymenoptera
- Family: Formicidae
- Subfamily: Dolichoderinae
- Genus: Linepithema
- Species: L. keiteli

Binomial name
- Linepithema keiteli (Forel, 1907)

Synonyms
- Iridomyrmex keiteli subfasciatus Wheeler, W.M. & Mann, 1914

= Linepithema keiteli =

Species of ant

Linepithema keiteli is a species of ant in the genus Linepithema. Described by Auguste-Henri Forel in 1907, the species is endemic to Haiti.
