= Linepithema inacatum =

Scientific classification
- Domain: Eukaryota
- Kingdom: Animalia
- Phylum: Arthropoda
- Class: Insecta
- Order: Hymenoptera
- Family: Formicidae
- Subfamily: Dolichoderinae
- Genus: Linepithema
- Species: L. inacatum

Binomial name
- Linepithema inacatum Bolton, 1995

Synonyms
- Linepithema gallardoi, Kusnezov 1969

Species of ant

Linepithema inacatum is a species of ant in the genus Linepithema. Described by Bolton in 1995, the species is endemic to Argentina and Brazil.
