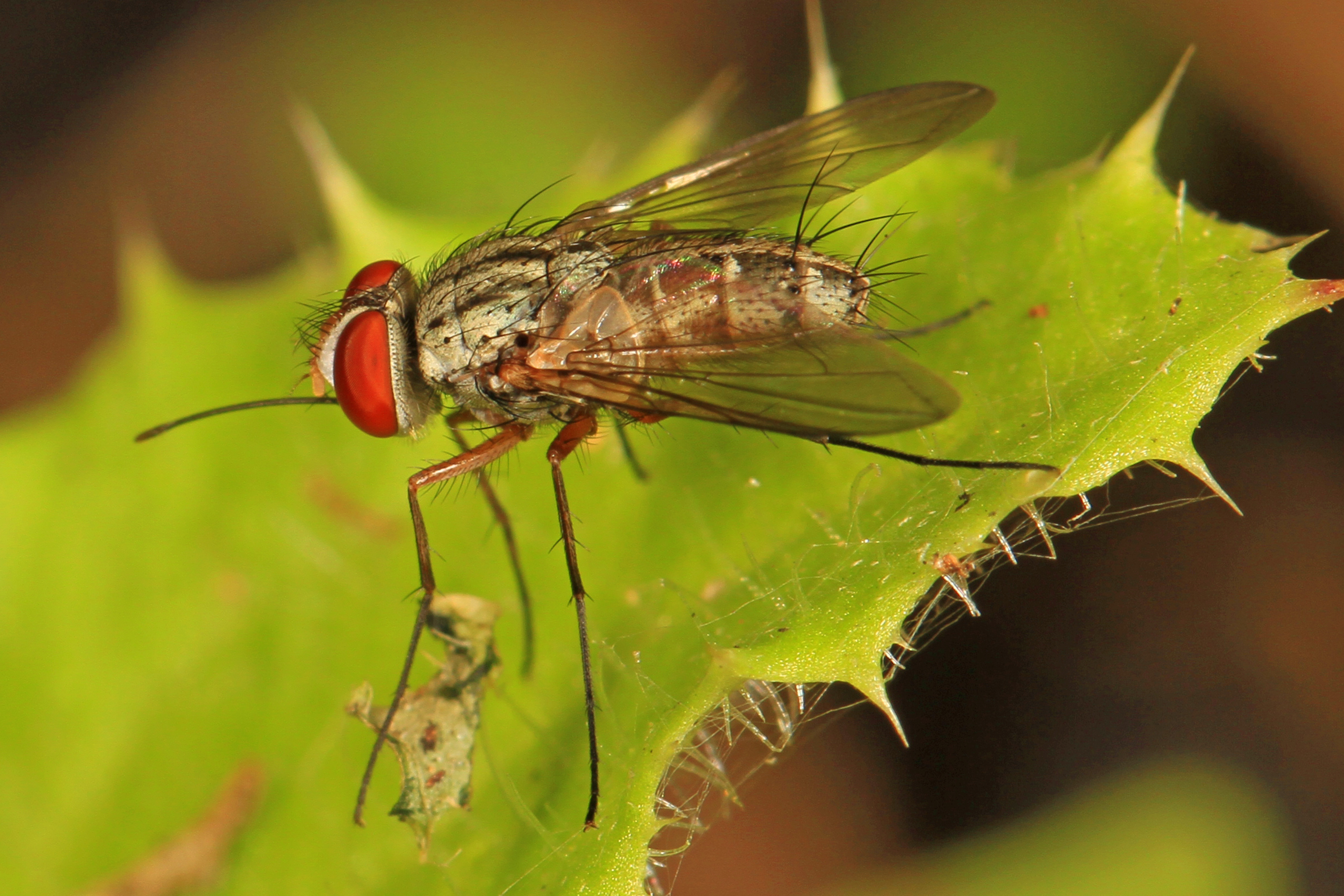
- Prosenoides flavipes

Scientific classification
- Kingdom: Animalia
- Phylum: Arthropoda
- Class: Insecta
- Order: Diptera
- Family: Tachinidae
- Subfamily: Dexiinae
- Tribe: Dexiini
- Genus: Prosenoides; Brauer & von Berganstamm, 1891

Type species
- Prosenoides papilio Brauer & von Bergenstamm, 1891

Synonyms
- Neoprosena Townsend, 1927; Periprosena Villeneuve, 1938

= Prosenoides =

Genus of flies

Prosenoides is a genus of flies in the family Tachinidae.

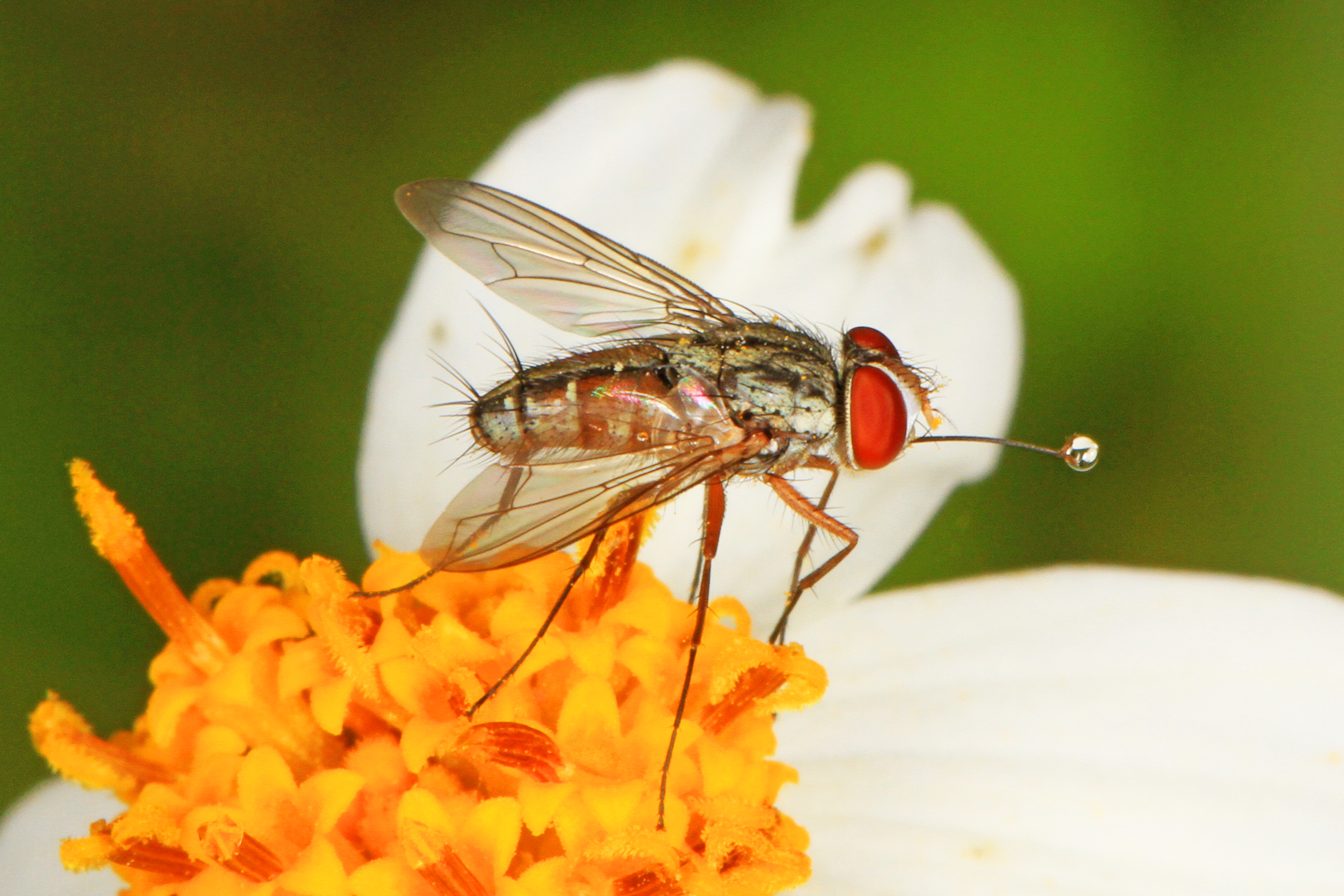
Prosenoides flavipes

== Species ==
- Prosenoides assimilis Reinhard, 1954
- Prosenoides curvirostris (Bigot, 1889)
- Prosenoides cytorus (Walker, 1849)
- Prosenoides diacrita Reinhard, 1954
- Prosenoides dispar (Villeneuve, 1938)
- Prosenoides flavipes Coquillett, 1895
- Prosenoides grandis Reinhard, 1954
- Prosenoides haustellata (Townsend, 1927)
- Prosenoides isodomos Reinhard, 1954
- Prosenoides longilingua (Villeneuve, 1943)
- Prosenoides tenuipes (Emden, 1947)
- Prosenoides trilineata Reinhard, 1954
