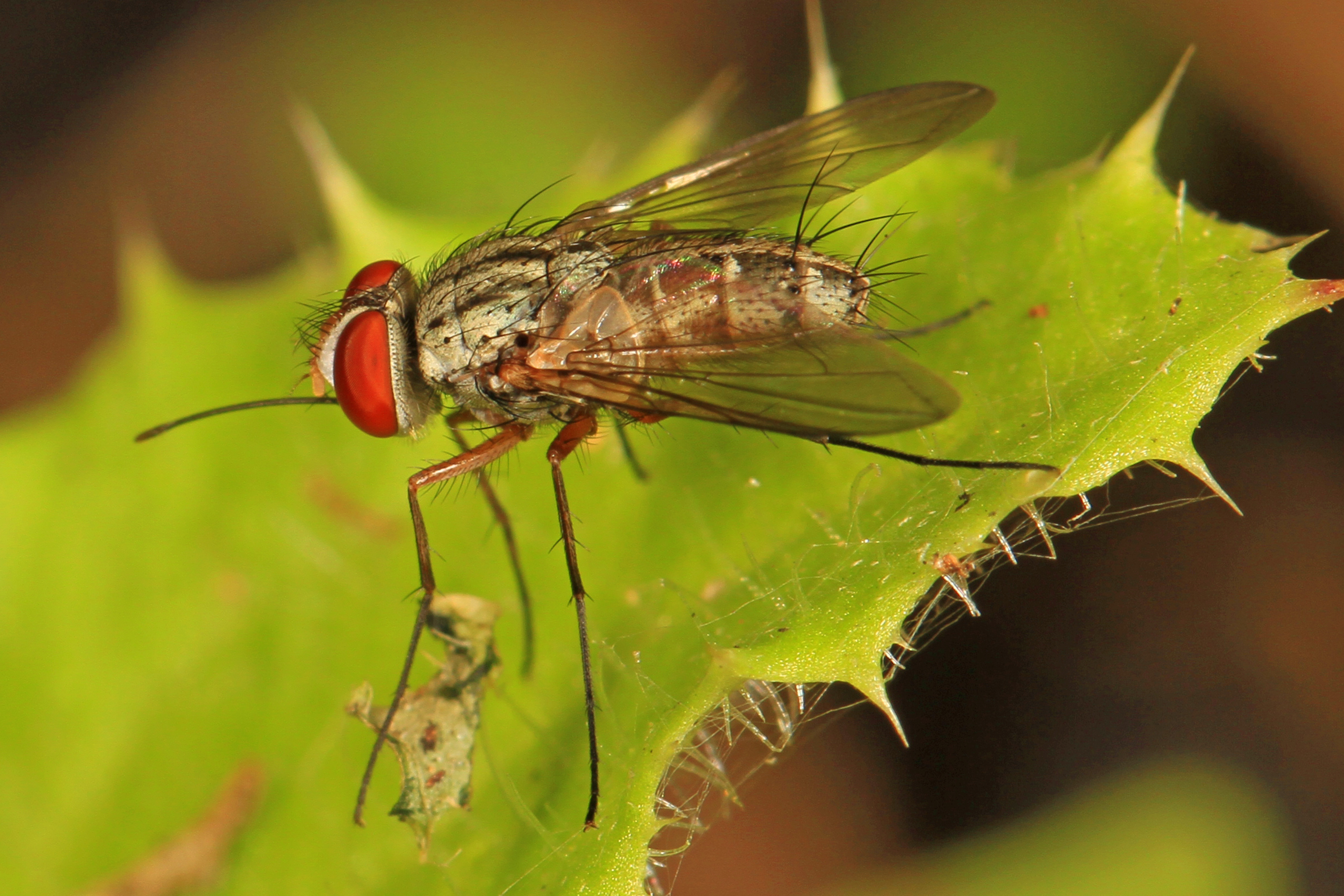
- Prosenoides flavipes

Scientific classification
- Kingdom: Animalia
- Phylum: Arthropoda
- Class: Insecta
- Order: Diptera
- Family: Tachinidae
- Subfamily: Dexiinae
- Tribe: Dexiini
- Genus: Prosenoides
- Species: P. flavipes

Binomial name
- Prosenoides flavipes Coquillett, 1895

= Prosenoides flavipes =

Species of fly

Prosenoides flavipes is a species of fly in the family Tachinidae.

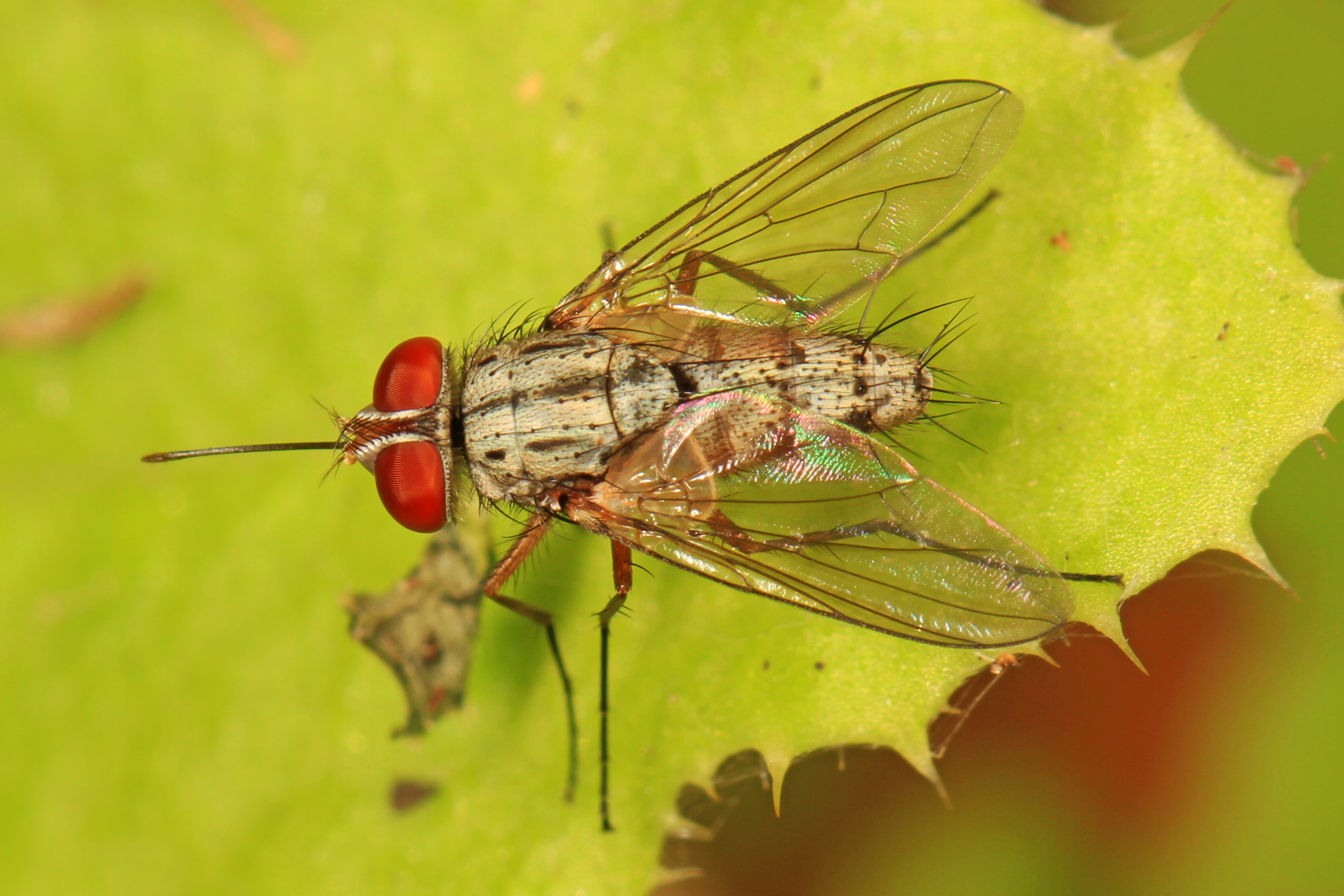

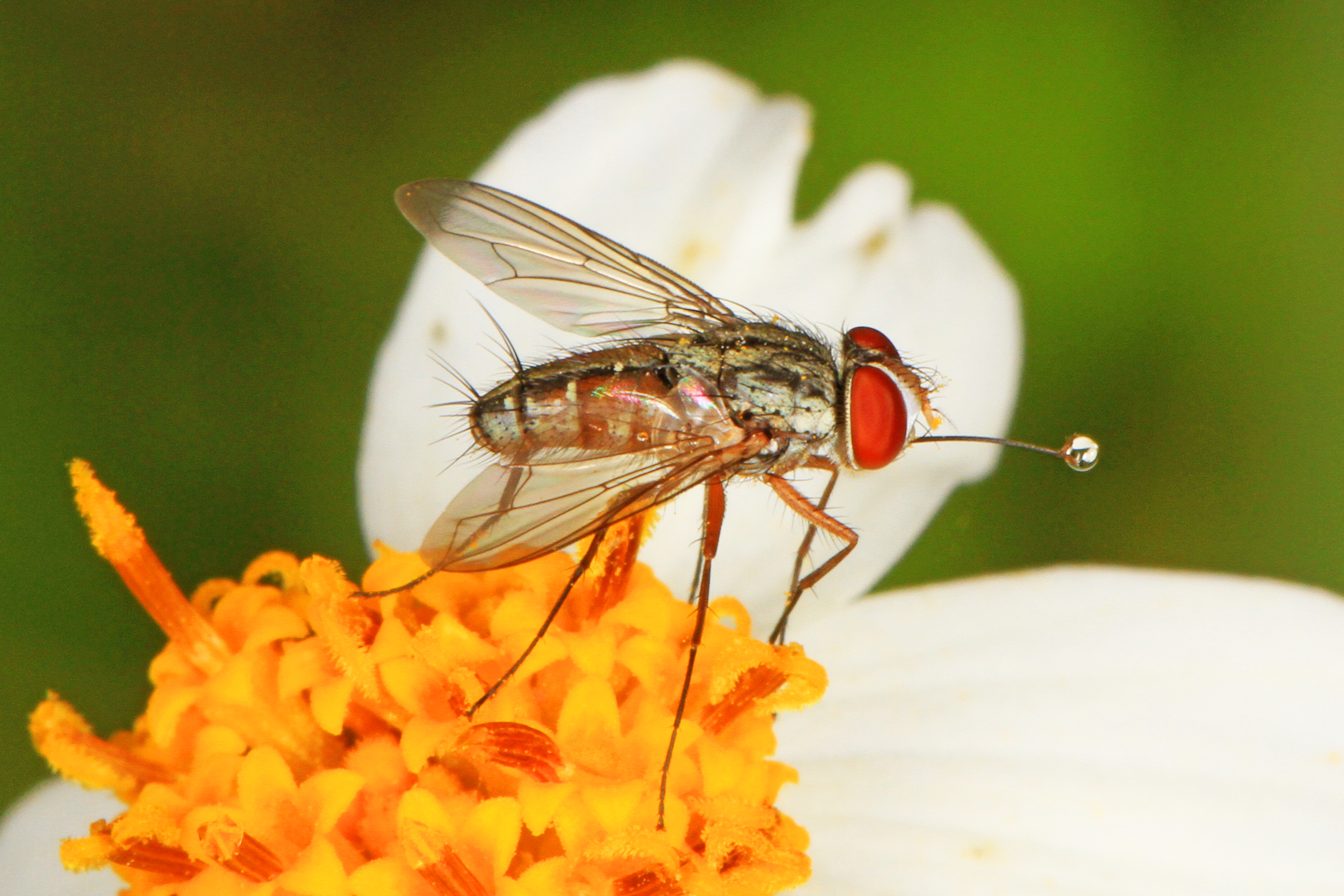

== Distribution ==
United States, Cuba, Dominican Republic, Jamaica.
