= Prosenoides grandis =

Scientific classification
- Kingdom: Animalia
- Phylum: Arthropoda
- Class: Insecta
- Order: Diptera
- Family: Tachinidae
- Subfamily: Dexiinae
- Tribe: Dexiini
- Genus: Prosenoides
- Species: P. grandis

Binomial name
- Prosenoides grandis Reinhard, 1954

Species of fly

Prosenoides grandis is a species of fly in the family Tachinidae.

== Distribution ==
United States, Mexico.
