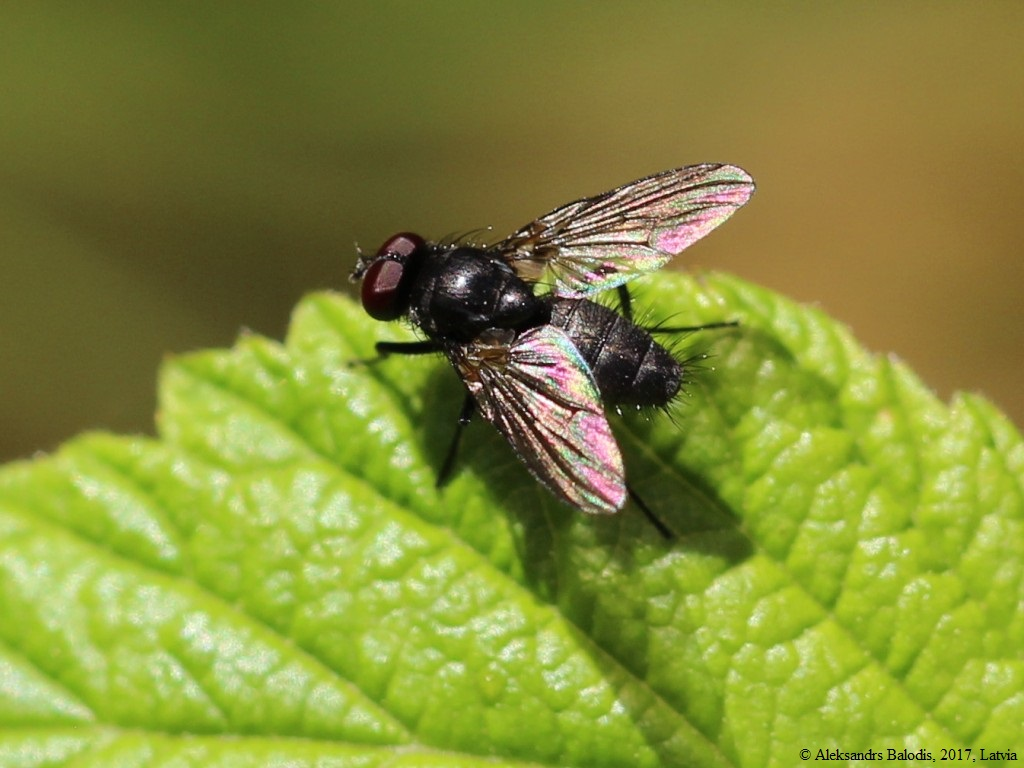
- Kirbya moerens

Scientific classification
- Kingdom: Animalia
- Phylum: Arthropoda
- Clade: Pancrustacea
- Class: Insecta
- Order: Diptera
- Family: Tachinidae
- Subfamily: Dexiinae
- Tribe: Voriini
- Genus: Kirbya; Robineau-Desvoidy, 1830

Type species
- Kirbya vernalis Robineau-Desvoidy, 1830

Synonyms
- Clista Meigen, 1838

= Kirbya =

Genus of flies

Kirbya is a genus of flies in the family Tachinidae.

== Subgenera & species ==
- Subgenus Coleophasia Townsend, 1931
  - Kirbya pacifica (Curran, 1927)
- Subgenus Hesperophasia Townsend, 1915
  - Kirbya aenescens (Curran, 1927)
  - Kirbya setosa (Townsend, 1915)
- Subgenus Hesperophasiopsis Townsend, 1915
  - Kirbya aldrichi (Curran, 1927)
  - Kirbya californica (Townsend, 1915)
  - Kirbya nigripennis (Curran, 1927)
- Subgenus Kirbya Townsend, 1915
  - Kirbya moerens (Meigen, 1830)
  - Kirbya unicolor Villeneuve, 1927
- Unplaced to subgenus
  - Kirbya turkmenica Richter, 1995
