= Kirbya setosa =

Scientific classification
- Kingdom: Animalia
- Phylum: Arthropoda
- Clade: Pancrustacea
- Class: Insecta
- Order: Diptera
- Family: Tachinidae
- Genus: Kirbya
- Subgenus: Hesperophasia
- Species: K. setosa

Binomial name
- Kirbya setosa (Townsend, 1915)

Synonyms
- Hesperophasia setosa Townsend, 1915

Species of fly

Kirbya setosa is a species of fly in the family Tachinidae.

== Distribution ==
United States, Mexico.
