= Hesperophasiopsis =

Scientific classification
- Kingdom: Animalia
- Phylum: Arthropoda
- Clade: Pancrustacea
- Class: Insecta
- Order: Diptera
- Family: Tachinidae
- Genus: Kirbya
- Subgenus: Hesperophasiopsis; Townsend, 1915

Type species
- Hesperophasia californica Townsend, 1915

Subgenus of flies

Hesperophasiopsis is a subgenus of flies in the family Tachinidae.

== Species ==
- Kirbya aldrichi (Curran, 1927)
- Kirbya californica (Townsend, 1915)
- Kirbya nigripennis (Curran, 1927)
