= Kirbya californica =

Scientific classification
- Kingdom: Animalia
- Phylum: Arthropoda
- Clade: Pancrustacea
- Class: Insecta
- Order: Diptera
- Family: Tachinidae
- Genus: Kirbya
- Subgenus: Hesperophasiopsis
- Species: K. californica

Binomial name
- Kirbya californica (Townsend, 1915)

Species of fly

Kirbya californica is a species of fly in the family Tachinidae.

== Distribution ==
California.
