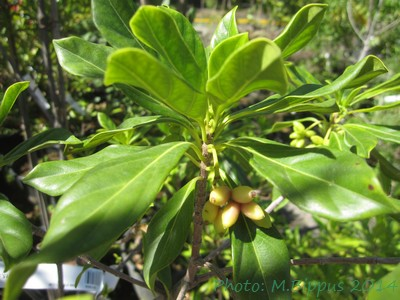
- Antirhea borbonica

Scientific classification
- Kingdom: Plantae
- Clade: Tracheophytes
- Clade: Angiosperms
- Clade: Eudicots
- Clade: Asterids
- Order: Gentianales
- Family: Rubiaceae
- Subfamily: Cinchonoideae
- Tribe: Guettardeae
- Genus: Antirhea; Comm. ex A.Juss.

Type species
- Antirhea borbonica J.F.Gmel.

Synonyms
- Antirhoea DC.; Antirrhoea Comm. ex A.Juss.; Guettardella Champ. ex Benth.

= Antirhea =

Genus of plants

Antirhea is a genus of flowering plants in the family Rubiaceae.

== Species ==
As of March 2023, Plants of the World Online accepted the following species:

- Antirhea bifida (Lam.) I.M.Johnst.
- Antirhea bifurcata (Desr.) Benth. & Hook.f.
- Antirhea borbonica J.F.Gmel.
- Antirhea madagascariensis Chaw

Many species are now placed in the genus Stenostomum, including:

- Antirhea aromatica → Stenostomum aromaticum
- Antirhea jamaicensis → Stenostomum jamaicense
- Antirhea portoricensis → Stenostomum portoricense
- Antirhea radiata → Stenostomum radiatum
- Antirhea sintenisii → Stenostomum sintenisii
- Antirhea tomentosa → Stenostomum tomentosum

== Distribution ==
Species of Antirhea are native to Indian Ocean islands off Africa: Madagascar, Mauritius, Réunion, and Rodrigues.
