= List of Timonius species =

This is a list of species in Timonius, a genus of flowering plants in the family Rubiaceae. Species range from the Seychelles and Sri Lanka to Indochina, Malesia, Papuasia, northern Australia, and the Pacific Islands.

As of March 2026 Plants of the World Online accepts 259 species.

== A ==
- Timonius abanii Jun H.Chen
- Timonius affinis A.Gray
- Timonius akunensis S.P.Darwin
- Timonius albus Volkens
- Timonius alejandroanus J.G.Chavez, Meve & Liede
- Timonius alius S.P.Darwin
- Timonius amboinicus (Miq.) Boerl.
- Timonius amungwiwanensis S.P.Darwin
- Timonius anodon (Miq.) Boerl.
- Timonius appendiculatus Merr.
- Timonius arboreus Elmer
- Timonius argenteus Valeton
- Timonius ariffinii Junhao Chen & K.M.Wong
- Timonius avenis Valeton
- Timonius azlanii Junhao Chen & K.M.Wong

== B ==
- Timonius balansanus (Baill.) Schltr.
- Timonius baziae Junhao Chen & K.M.Wong
- Timonius beamanii K.M.Wong & Jun H.Chen
- Timonius belensis Merr. & L.M.Perry
- Timonius berhamanii Junhao Chen & K.M.Wong
- Timonius billitonensis Valeton
- Timonius bismarckensis S.P.Darwin
- Timonius bogoriensis Valeton
- Timonius borneensis Valeton
- Timonius bosaviensis S.P.Darwin
- Timonius bougainvillensis Merr. & L.M.Perry
- Timonius boycei Junhao Chen & K.M.Wong
- Timonius bracteatus Merr. & L.M.Perry
- Timonius bracteoides S.P.Darwin
- Timonius branderhorstii Valeton
- Timonius budaensis Junhao Chen & K.M.Wong
- Timonius bullatus K.M.Wong & Jun H.Chen
- Timonius buwaldae Junhao Chen & K.M.Wong

== C ==
- Timonius calcicola Junhao Chen & K.M.Wong
- Timonius carii S.P.Darwin
- Timonius carstensensis Wernham
- Timonius caudatifolius Elmer
- Timonius caudatus Valeton
- Timonius celebicus Koord.
- Timonius chaianthus Junhao Chen & K.M.Wong
- Timonius chanii Junhao Chen & K.M.Wong
- Timonius cheechiewii Junhao Chen & K.M.Wong
- Timonius chinanthus Junhao Chen & K.M.Wong
- Timonius christinae Junhao Chen & K.M.Wong
- Timonius clathratus S.P.Darwin
- Timonius clementis Merr.
- Timonius collinus Junhao Chen & K.M.Wong
- Timonius confertiflorus Merr.
- Timonius coodei Junhao Chen & K.M.Wong
- Timonius corneri K.M.Wong
- Timonius corymbosus Valeton
- Timonius creber S.P.Darwin
- Timonius cryptophlebus S.Moore
- Timonius cuneatus Warb.
- Timonius cyathicalyx S.P.Darwin

== D ==
- Timonius decipiens Merr. & L.M.Perry
- Timonius denigricans P.K.Hoo
- Timonius densiflorus Valeton
- Timonius devogelii Junhao Chen & K.M.Wong
- Timonius diffusus Ridl.
- Timonius dolichophyllus (Merr. & L.M.Perry) S.P.Darwin
- Timonius dumagat J.G.Chavez

== E ==
- Timonius elegans S.P.Darwin
- Timonius elisabethiae Junhao Chen & K.M.Wong
- Timonius enderianus Warb.
- Timonius endertii Junhao Chen & K.M.Wong
- Timonius epiphyticus Elmer
- Timonius eranthus Junhao Chen & K.M.Wong
- Timonius eremiticus J.G.Chavez & Banag
- Timonius esherianus W.W.Sm.
- Timonius eximius (Baill.) Schltr.

== F ==
- Timonius ferrugineus Merr.
- Timonius filipes Wernham
- Timonius finlaysonianus (Wall. ex G.Don) Hook.f.
- Timonius flavescens (Jack) Baker
- Timonius fuscus (Korth.) Walp.

== G ==
- Timonius gammillii Elmer
- Timonius ganesanii Junhao Chen & K.M.Wong
- Timonius glabrior (Valeton) K.M.Wong
- Timonius gracilipes Merr.
- Timonius grandifolius Valeton

== H ==
- Timonius hallieri Junhao Chen & K.M.Wong
- Timonius hentyi S.P.Darwin
- Timonius heptamerus Wernham
- Timonius hirsutus Merr.
- Timonius hughtanii Junhao Chen & K.M.Wong
- Timonius hydrangeifolius (Miq.) Boerl.

== I – J ==
- Timonius imitans Merr. & L.M.Perry
- Timonius insularis S.P.Darwin
- Timonius involucratus Merr.
- Timonius jangarunii Junhao Chen & K.M.Wong
- Timonius jiewhoei Junhao Chen & K.M.Wong
- Timonius jobiensis Wernham
- Timonius joffreanthus Junhao Chen & K.M.Wong
- Timonius juliasangiae Junhao Chen & K.M.Wong

== K ==
- Timonius kalimantanensis Junhao Chen & K.M.Wong
- Timonius kaniensis Valeton
- Timonius keningauensis Junhao Chen & K.M.Wong
- Timonius keranjiensis Junhao Chen & K.M.Wong
- Timonius kessleri Junhao Chen & K.M.Wong
- Timonius kiahiae Junhao Chen & K.M.Wong
- Timonius kinabaluensis Jun H.Chen
- Timonius klossii Wernham
- Timonius koikokoensis Wernham
- Timonius koordersii Valeton
- Timonius korrensis Kaneh.
- Timonius korthalsii Junhao Chen & K.M.Wong
- Timonius kostermansii S.P.Darwin
- Timonius kuteiensis Junhao Chen & K.M.Wong

== L ==
- Timonius laevigatus Valeton
- Timonius lagenifer S.P.Darwin
- Timonius lamii S.P.Darwin
- Timonius lanceolatus Merr.
- Timonius lasianthoides Valeton
- Timonius latifolius K.Schum. & Lauterb.
- Timonius laugerioides Wernham
- Timonius lawalawaensis Junhao Chen & K.M.Wong
- Timonius laxus King & Gamble
- Timonius ledermannii Valeton
- Timonius leopoldii Jun H.Chen & K.M.Wong
- Timonius leptocalyx S.P.Darwin
- Timonius longifolius Valeton
- Timonius longistipulus Merr.
- Timonius longitubus Merr. & L.M.Perry
- Timonius louiseanthus Junhao Chen & K.M.Wong

== M ==
- Timonius macrophyllus (Teijsm. & Binn.) Valeton
- Timonius malawaliensis Junhao Chen & K.M.Wong
- Timonius mapuluensis Junhao Chen & K.M.Wong
- Timonius matangensis Valeton
- Timonius megalocalyx P.K.Hoo
- Timonius melanophloeus Merr. & L.M.Perry
- Timonius meliganensis Junhao Chen & K.M.Wong
- Timonius meridionalis S.P.Darwin
- Timonius merokensis Wernham
- Timonius middletonii Junhao Chen & K.M.Wong
- Timonius minahassae Koord.
- Timonius minutifolius Valeton
- Timonius modestus Merr. & L.M.Perry
- Timonius mohamedii Junhao Chen & K.M.Wong
- Timonius mollis Valeton
- Timonius moluccanus S.P.Darwin
- Timonius monkoboensis Junhao Chen & K.M.Wong
- Timonius montanus Ridl.
- Timonius morobensis S.P.Darwin
- Timonius multinervis Valeton
- Timonius murudensis Junhao Chen & K.M.Wong

== N ==
- Timonius neobritannicus S.P.Darwin
- Timonius neocaledonicus Schltr. & K.Krause
- Timonius niahensis Junhao Chen & K.M.Wong
- Timonius nitens Merr. & L.M.Perry
- Timonius nitidus (Bartl. ex DC.) Fern.-Vill.
- Timonius noli-tangere J.G.Chavez, Alejandro & Meve
- Timonius novoguineensis Warb.
- Timonius nudiceps Valeton
- Timonius nymannii Valeton

== O ==
- Timonius oblanceolatus Valeton
- Timonius oblongus Valeton
- Timonius obovatifolius Junhao Chen & K.M.Wong
- Timonius obovatus Elmer
- Timonius octonervius Merr.
- Timonius oktediensis S.P.Darwin
- Timonius ophioliticus Jun H.Chen
- Timonius oreophilus Ridl.
- Timonius ovalis (Korth.) Boerl.
- Timonius ovalistipulus Valeton
- Timonius oxyphyllus Gand.

== P – Q ==
- Timonius pachyphyllus Merr.
- Timonius paiawensis S.P.Darwin
- Timonius palawanensis Elmer
- Timonius paludosus Junhao Chen & K.M.Wong
- Timonius panayensis Merr.
- Timonius pannosus Jun H.Chen
- Timonius papuanus Merr.
- Timonius paulleongii Junhao Chen & K.M.Wong
- Timonius pearceae Junhao Chen & K.M.Wong
- Timonius pedunculatus (Thunb.) Ormerod
- Timonius pereirae Junhao Chen & K.M.Wong
- Timonius philippinensis Merr.
- Timonius piusii Junhao Chen & K.M.Wong
- Timonius platycarpus Montrouz.
- Timonius politus Junhao Chen & K.M.Wong
- Timonius polyneurus Valeton
- Timonius ponapensis Valeton
- Timonius postaranthus Junhao Chen & K.M.Wong
- Timonius pseudaffinis S.P.Darwin
- Timonius pseudoarboreus J.G.Chavez
- Timonius pseudocapitatus (Scheff.) F.Muell.
- Timonius puayyokii Junhao Chen & K.M.Wong
- Timonius pubistipulus S.P.Darwin
- Timonius puffii Junhao Chen & K.M.Wong
- Timonius pulgarensis Elmer
- Timonius pullenii S.P.Darwin
- Timonius pulposus C.T.White
- Timonius quinqueflorus Merr.

== R ==
- Timonius reflexus S.P.Darwin
- Timonius repertus S.P.Darwin
- Timonius ridhanthus Junhao Chen & K.M.Wong
- Timonius ridleyi Merr.
- Timonius ridsdalei J.G.Chavez
- Timonius rigidus (Miq.) F.Muell.
- Timonius rimiae Junhao Chen & K.M.Wong
- Timonius riswanii Junhao Chen & K.M.Wong
- Timonius rivularis Merr. & L.M.Perry
- Timonius roemeri Valeton
- Timonius rosselensis S.P.Darwin
- Timonius rufescens (Miq.) Boerl.
- Timonius rufus Valeton
- Timonius runiae Junhao Chen & K.M.Wong

== S ==
- Timonius salicifolius Valeton
- Timonius salsedoi Fosberg & Sachet
- Timonius sampitensis Junhao Chen & K.M.Wong
- Timonius scaber Valeton
- Timonius scabriflorus (Valeton) Merr. & L.M.Perry
- Timonius schefferi Valeton
- Timonius schumannii Koord. ex Valeton
- Timonius secundiflorus S.P.Darwin
- Timonius seowchoenanthus Junhao Chen & K.M.Wong
- Timonius sepilokensis Junhao Chen & K.M.Wong
- Timonius sepulutensis Junhao Chen & K.M.Wong
- Timonius serenae Junhao Chen & K.M.Wong
- Timonius sessilis (Scheff. ex King & Gamble) Valeton
- Timonius silamensis Junhao Chen & K.M.Wong
- Timonius singularis (F.Muell.) L.S.Sm.
- Timonius sinyengiae Junhao Chen & K.M.Wong
- Timonius solomonensis Merr. & L.M.Perry
- Timonius spes-vitarum J.G.Chavez
- Timonius splendens (Miq.) Boerl.
- Timonius stenolobus Jun H.Chen & K.M.Wong
- Timonius stevendarwinii J.G.Chavez
- Timonius subauritus Valeton
- Timonius subavenis (Valeton) S.P.Darwin
- Timonius subcoriaceus Valeton
- Timonius subsessilis Valeton
- Timonius sulitii Merr. & Quisumb. ex J.G.Chavez & Tandang
- Timonius sunsuronensis Junhao Chen & K.M.Wong
- Timonius suzanae Junhao Chen & K.M.Wong
- Timonius sylvestris S.Moore

== T ==
- Timonius tambuyukonensis Jun H.Chen
- Timonius ternifolius (Bartl. ex DC.) Fern.-Vill.
- Timonius teysmannii Valeton
- Timonius thomasii Junhao Chen & K.M.Wong
- Timonius timon (Spreng.) Merr.
- Timonius tjiasmantoi Junhao Chen & K.M.Wong
- Timonius tomentosus (Valeton) S.P.Darwin
- Timonius trichanthus Merr. & L.M.Perry
- Timonius trichocaulon (Miq.) Boerl.
- Timonius trichocladus Merr. & L.M.Perry

== U – V ==
- Timonius uniflorus (Banks ex C.F.Gaertn.) Govaerts
- Timonius vaccinioides Wernham ex Ridl.
- Timonius valetonii Elmer
- Timonius vanderentii Junhao Chen & K.M.Wong
- Timonius versteegii Valeton
- Timonius villosus Valeton
- Timonius virgatus Merr. & L.M.Perry

== W – Z ==
- Timonius wallichianus Valeton
- Timonius wollastonii Wernham
- Timonius wrayi King & Gamble
- Timonius xanthocarpus Merr. & L.M.Perry
- Timonius zuckianus S.P.Darwin
