= Arachnothryx peruviana =

Conservation status
- Vulnerable (IUCN 2.3)

Scientific classification
- Kingdom: Plantae
- Clade: Tracheophytes
- Clade: Angiosperms
- Clade: Eudicots
- Clade: Asterids
- Order: Gentianales
- Family: Rubiaceae
- Subfamily: Cinchonoideae
- Tribe: Guettardeae
- Genus: Arachnothryx
- Species: A. peruviana

Binomial name
- Arachnothryx peruviana (Standl.) Steyerm. (1967)

Synonyms
- Rondeletia peruviana Standl. (1931)

Species of plant

Arachnothryx peruviana is a species of plant in the family Rubiaceae. It is a shrub endemic to Loreto Department of northeastern Peru.
