= Machaon =

Machaon may refer to:

- Machaon (mythology), the son of Asclepius, a physician and warrior who fought for the Greeks in the Trojan War
- Papilio machaon, or Old World swallowtail, a butterfly, also known as the common yellow swallowtail or simply the swallowtail

== See also ==
- Machaonia, a genus of flowering plants in the family Rubiaceae
