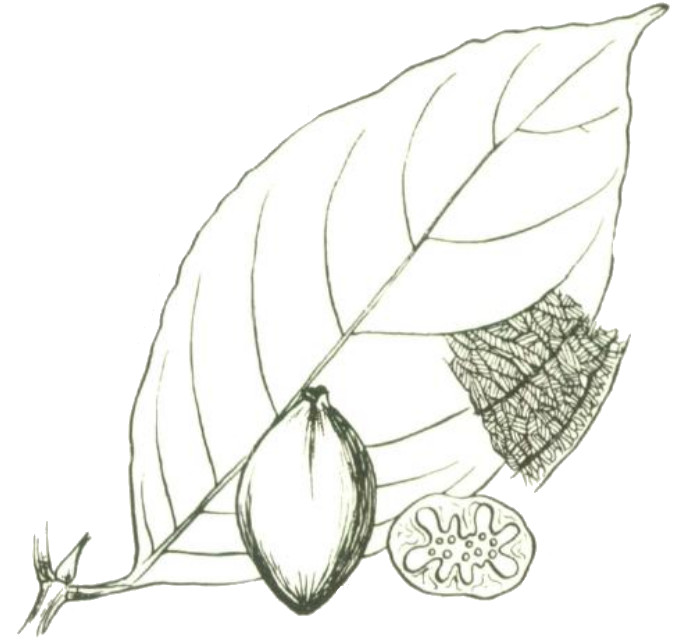
- Achilleanthus megacarpus

Scientific classification
- Kingdom: Plantae
- Clade: Tracheophytes
- Clade: Angiosperms
- Clade: Eudicots
- Clade: Asterids
- Order: Gentianales
- Family: Rubiaceae
- Subfamily: Cinchonoideae
- Tribe: Guettardeae
- Genus: Achilleanthus; J.G.Chavez (2021)

Species
- 7; see text

= Achilleanthus =

Genus of flowering plants

Achilleanthus is a genus of flowering plants in family Rubiaceae. It includes seven species native to the Lesser Sunda Islands, New Guinea, and the southwest Pacific (Bismarck Archipelago, Solomon Islands, Santa Cruz Islands, New Caledonia, and Fiji).

- Achilleanthus glabrescens (Schltr.) J.G.Chavez, Liede & Meve
- Achilleanthus hypolasius (Baill.) J.G.Chavez
- Achilleanthus megacarpus (Merr. & L.M.Perry) J.G.Chavez
- Achilleanthus ngoyensis (Schltr.) J.G.Chavez, Liede & Meve
- Achilleanthus novobrittaniensis (M.E.Jansen) J.G.Chavez
- Achilleanthus schmutzii (M.E.Jansen) J.G.Chavez
- Achilleanthus smithii (Fosberg) J.G.Chavez
