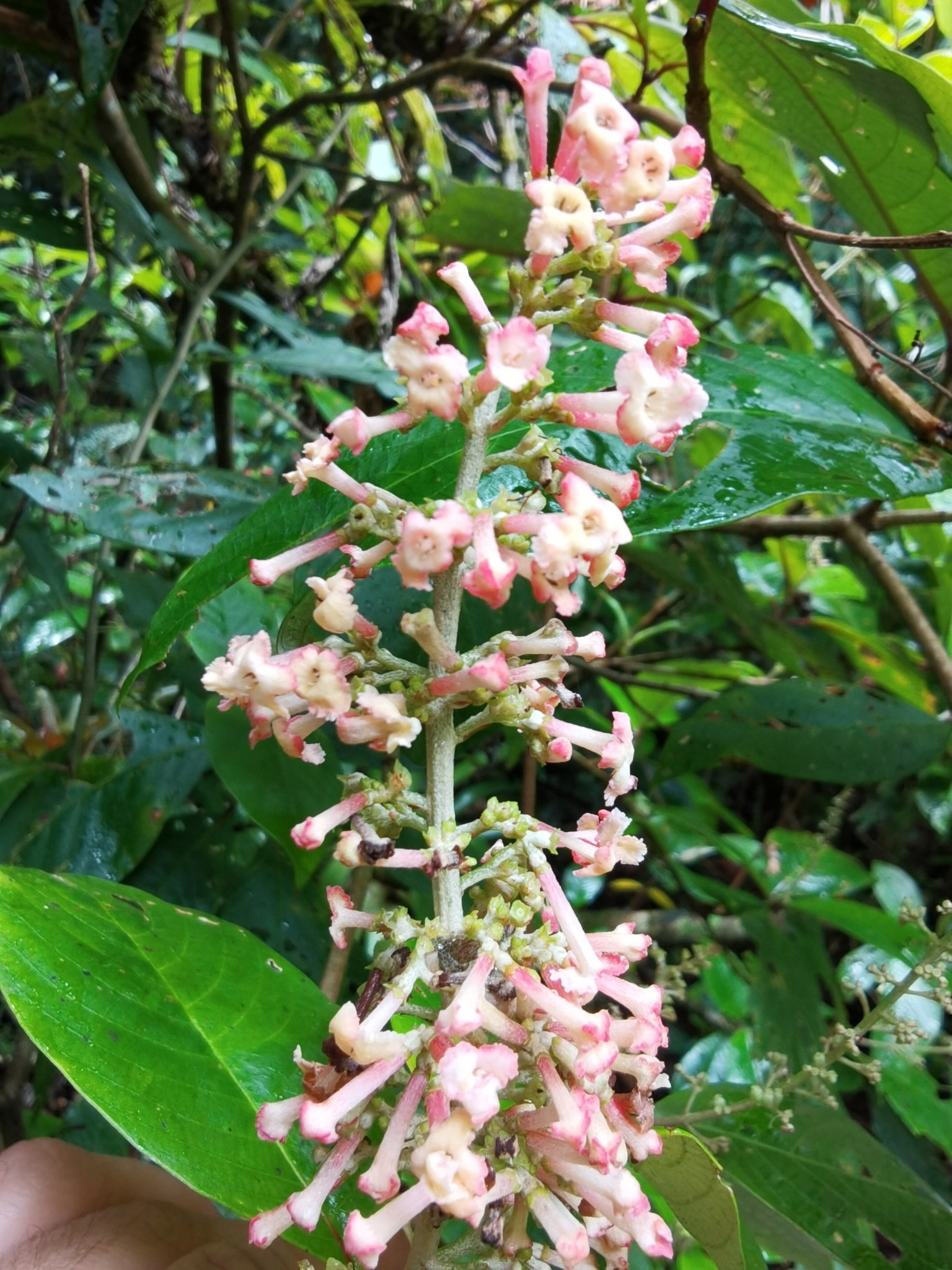
- Arachnothryx buddleioides

Scientific classification
- Kingdom: Plantae
- Clade: Tracheophytes
- Clade: Angiosperms
- Clade: Eudicots
- Clade: Asterids
- Order: Gentianales
- Family: Rubiaceae
- Subfamily: Cinchonoideae
- Tribe: Guettardeae
- Genus: Arachnothryx; Planch.

Type species
- Arachnothryx leucophylla (Kunth) Planch.

Synonyms
- Cuatrecasasiodendron Steyerm.; Javorkaea Borhidi & Jarai-Koml.; Otocalyx Brandegee; Siphonandra Turcz.

= Arachnothryx =

Species of plant

Arachnothryx is a genus of flowering plants in the family Rubiaceae. It contains about 101 species which range from Mexico to Peru and to Trinidad.

== Taxonomy ==
Arachnothryx was named by Jules Émile Planchon in 1849. This generic name is derived from Ancient Greek: arachne or arachnos, "a spider", and thrix or trichos, "hair".

As currently circumscribed, Arachnothryx is paraphyletic over Cuatrecasasiodendron, Gonzalagunia, and Javorkaea. Some authors have included these genera in a broadly defined Rondeletia, but molecular phylogenetic studies have shown that they are more closely related to Guettarda than to Rondeletia.

== Species ==
101 species are accepted.

- Arachnothryx angustispica Borhidi, E.Martínez & Ramos
- Arachnothryx aspera (Standl.) Borhidi
- Arachnothryx atravesadensis (Lorence) Borhidi
- Arachnothryx axillaris Torr.-Montúfar & H.Ochot.
- Arachnothryx bertieroides (Standl.) Borhidi
- Arachnothryx bourgaei (Standl.) Borhidi
- Arachnothryx brachytyrsa Borhidi
- Arachnothryx brenesii (Standl.) Borhidi
- Arachnothryx buddleioides (Benth.) Planch.
- Arachnothryx calycophylla Steyerm.
- Arachnothryx calycosa (Donn.Sm.) Borhidi
- Arachnothryx capitellata (Hemsl.) Borhidi
- Arachnothryx caucana (Standl. ex Steyerm.) Steyerm.
- Arachnothryx chaconii (Lorence) Borhidi
- Arachnothryx chiapensis (Brandegee) Borhidi
- Arachnothryx chimalaparum Lorence ex Borhidi
- Arachnothryx chimboracensis (Standl.) Steyerm.
- Arachnothryx chiriquiana (Lorence) Borhidi
- Arachnothryx colombiana (Rusby) Steyerm.
- Arachnothryx costanensis Steyerm.
- Arachnothryx cupreiflora (K.Schum. & K.Krause) Steyerm.
- Arachnothryx darienensis (Standl.) Borhidi
- Arachnothryx discolor (Kunth) Planch.
- Arachnothryx dwyeri (Lorence) Borhidi
- Arachnothryx educta (Standl. ex Steyerm.) Steyerm.
- Arachnothryx euryphylla (Standl.) Steyerm.
- Arachnothryx evansii (Lorence) Borhidi
- Arachnothryx flocculosa Borhidi
- Arachnothryx flores-olverae Torr.-Montúfar & H.Ochot.
- Arachnothryx fosbergii Steyerm.
- Arachnothryx garciae Standl. ex Steyerm.
- Arachnothryx ginetteae (Lorence) Borhidi
- Arachnothryx glabrata (Standl.) Steyerm.
- Arachnothryx gonzaleoides (Standl.) Borhidi
- Arachnothryx gracilis (Hemsl.) Borhidi
- Arachnothryx gracilispica (Standl.) Borhidi
- Arachnothryx guerrerensis (Lorence) Borhidi
- Arachnothryx guettardioides Standl. ex Steyerm.
- Arachnothryx heteranthera (Brandegee) Borhidi
- Arachnothryx hispidula Griseb.
- Arachnothryx hondurensis (Donn.Sm.) Lorence
- Arachnothryx jaliscensis Borhidi & E.Martínez
- Arachnothryx jurgensenii (Hemsl.) Borhidi
- Arachnothryx laniflora (Benth.) Planch.
- Arachnothryx latiloba Borhidi
- Arachnothryx leucophylla (Kunth) Planch.
- Arachnothryx lineolata Borhidi
- Arachnothryx linguiformis (Hemsl.) Borhidi
- Arachnothryx linguiloba Borhidi & Diego
- Arachnothryx lojensis Steyerm.
- Arachnothryx macrocalyx (Standl. & Steyerm.) Borhidi
- Arachnothryx manantlanensis (Lorence) Borhidi
- Arachnothryx megalantha (Lorence) Lorence
- Arachnothryx mexicana (Turcz.) Borhidi
- Arachnothryx michoacana Borhidi
- Arachnothryx monteverdensis (Lorence) Borhidi
- Arachnothryx monticola Borhidi
- Arachnothryx myriantha (Standl. & Steyerm.) Borhidi
- Arachnothryx nebulosa (Standl.) Borhidi
- Arachnothryx nelsonii Lorence
- Arachnothryx nitida (Hemsl.) Borhidi
- Arachnothryx ovandensis (Lundell) Borhidi
- Arachnothryx ovata (Rusby) Steyerm.
- Arachnothryx pansamalana (Standl.) Borhidi
- Arachnothryx pauciflora Borhidi
- Arachnothryx perezii (Standl. ex Steyerm.) Steyerm.
- Arachnothryx peruviana (Standl.) Steyerm.
- Arachnothryx povedae (Lorence) Borhidi
- Arachnothryx purpurea (Lorence) Borhidi
- Arachnothryx pyramidalis (Lundell) Borhidi
- Arachnothryx reflexa (Benth.) Planch.
- Arachnothryx rekoi (Standl.) Borhidi
- Arachnothryx ricoae (Lorence) Borhidi
- Arachnothryx rubens (L.O.Williams) Borhidi
- Arachnothryx rufescens (B.L.Rob.) Borhidi
- Arachnothryx rugulosa (Standl.) Steyerm.
- Arachnothryx rzedowskii (Lorence) Borhidi
- Arachnothryx sanchezii Borhidi & Salas-Mor.
- Arachnothryx scabra (Hemsl.) Borhidi
- Arachnothryx scoti (Lorence) Borhidi
- Arachnothryx secunda (Standl.) Borhidi
- Arachnothryx secundiflora (B.L.Rob.) Borhidi
- Arachnothryx septicidalis (B.L.Rob.) Borhidi
- Arachnothryx sessilis Borhidi & G.Ortiz
- Arachnothryx sinaloae Borhidi
- Arachnothryx skutchii (Standl. & Steyerm.) Borhidi
- Arachnothryx sousae Borhidi
- Arachnothryx spectabilis (Steyerm.) Rova
- Arachnothryx stachyoidea (Donn.Sm.) Borhidi
- Arachnothryx subglabra Borhidi & N.C.Jiménez
- Arachnothryx tacanensis (Lundell) Borhidi
- Arachnothryx tayloriae (Lorence) Borhidi
- Arachnothryx tenorioi (Lorence) Borhidi
- Arachnothryx tenuisepala Borhidi
- Arachnothryx thiemei (Donn.Sm.) Borhidi
- Arachnothryx torresii (Standl.) Borhidi
- Arachnothryx tuxtlensis (Lorence & Cast.-Campos) Borhidi
- Arachnothryx uxpanapensis (Lorence & Cast.-Campos) Borhidi
- Arachnothryx venezuelensis Steyerm.
- Arachnothryx villosa (Hemsl.) Borhidi
- Arachnothryx wendtii (Lorence & Cast.-Campos) Borhidi

=== Formerly placed here ===
- Renistipula costaricensis (Standl.) Borhidi (as Arachnothryx costaricensis (Standl.) Borhidi)
- Renistipula galeottii (Standl.) Borhidi (as Arachnothryx galeottii (Standl.) Borhidi)
- Renistipula izabalensis (Standl. & Steyerm.) Borhidi (as Arachnothryx izabalensis (Standl. & Steyerm.) Borhidi)
