= Allenanthus =

Scientific classification
- Kingdom: Plantae
- Clade: Tracheophytes
- Clade: Angiosperms
- Clade: Eudicots
- Clade: Asterids
- Order: Gentianales
- Family: Rubiaceae
- Subfamily: Cinchonoideae
- Tribe: Guettardeae
- Genus: Allenanthus; Standl.

Type species
- Allenanthus erythrocarpus Standl.

Extinct genus of flowering plants

Allenanthus was a genus of flowering plants in the family Rubiaceae but is no longer recognized. It has been sunk into synonymy with Machaonia.

== Taxonomy ==
Allenanthus was named by Paul Standley in 1940 in Annals of the Missouri Botanical Garden. It was named in honor of Paul Hamilton Allen (1911-1963).

Until 2004, two species had been recognized, but fieldwork has shown that there is a continuum of variation between them.

Comparisons of morphological characters and DNA sequences have shown that Allenanthus is embedded in Machaonia. This was confirmed by a molecular phylogenetic study of the subfamily Cinchonoideae in 2010. Because of these results, Allenanthus is no longer maintained as a separate genus.

== Species ==
- Allenanthus erythrocarpus Standl.
- Allenanthus hondurensis Standl.
