= Renistipula =

Scientific classification
- Kingdom: Plantae
- Clade: Tracheophytes
- Clade: Angiosperms
- Clade: Eudicots
- Clade: Asterids
- Order: Gentianales
- Family: Rubiaceae
- Tribe: Guettardeae
- Genus: Renistipula; Borhidi

Genus of flowering plants

Renistipula is a genus of flowering plants in the genus Rubiaceae. It includes three species native to Central America and southern Mexico.

The genus was described by Attila Borhidi in 2004. Its species were formerly placed in genus Arachnothryx.

Three species are accepted:

- Renistipula costaricensis (Standl.) Borhidi
- Renistipula galeottii (Standl.) Borhidi
- Renistipula izabalensis (Standl. & Steyerm.) Borhidi
