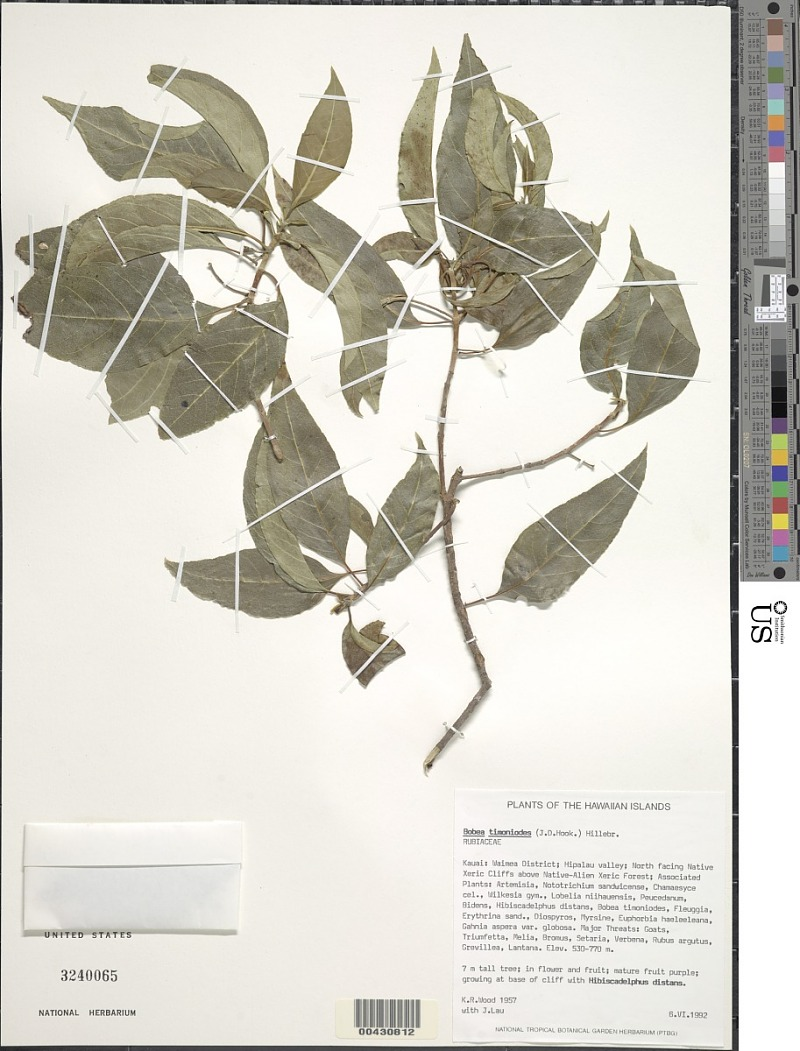

Conservation status
- Endangered (IUCN 3.1)

- Critically Imperiled (NatureServe)

Scientific classification
- Kingdom: Plantae
- Clade: Tracheophytes
- Clade: Angiosperms
- Clade: Eudicots
- Clade: Asterids
- Order: Gentianales
- Family: Rubiaceae
- Genus: Bobea
- Species: B. timonioides

Binomial name
- Bobea timonioides (Hook.f.) Hillebr.

Synonyms
- Obbea timonioides Hook.f.

= Bobea timonioides =

Species of plant

ʻAhakea (Bobea timonioides) is a species of flowering tree in the coffee family, Rubiaceae, that is endemic to Hawaiʻi. It inhabits dry, coastal mesic and mixed mesic forests at elevations of 250–580 metres (820–1,900 ft) on the islands of Hawaiʻi and Maui. It is threatened by habitat loss.

== Description ==
It is a small to medium tree which can grow up to 30 feet (9 metres) tall. The bark is smooth and pale tan or nearly white. The shiny, leathery leaves are simple, arranged oppositely and reach 4 to 5 inches (10 to 12 centimetres) long, and bear conspicuous, sometimes reddish veins. The small flowers, which range in color from green to yellow to white, are trumpet shaped and slightly fragrant. ʻAhakea has been observed flowering year-round, although flower and bud production drops in June and August. The drupe fruits are oval-shaped, about half an inch long, and bear between two and seven seeds. Fruits are green when immature, and ripen to a purplish to black color when mature.

== Distribution and habitat ==
ʻAhakea is endemic to the Hawaiian Islands, being found on the islands of Hawaiʻi, O'ahu, and Kaua'i. No specimens of B. timonioides have been collected from Maui, but collections made along the southern slopes of Haleakalā are believed to represent hybrids between B. timonioides and Bobea sandwicensis. It occurs in dry to mesic lowland forests between 820 and 1,900 feet (250 to 580 metres), and is best known from the districts of Puna and Kona on Hawaiʻi.

Strands in the Nāulu forest area of the Hawaiʻi Volcanoes National Park (HVNP) have been found most often in closed tall ʻōhiʻa lehua (Metrosideros polymorpha) dry to mesic forests on the steep slopes of kīpuka, in substrates of pāhoehoe and ʻaʻā lava flows with little soil development.

== Conservation ==
Bombea timonioides is classified by the IUCN as Endangered, and by NatureServe as Critically Imperiled. It is threatened by habitat destruction, both human-caused and as a result of recent volcanic activity, and introduced species. There are believed to be less than 500 individuals total scattered across ten to fifteen subpopulations.

Existing strands of ʻahakea within the HVNP are the best known and best protected individuals of this species. However, trees within the HVNP are also vulnerable to lava flows and habitat alteration and destruction caused by volcanic activity. About 100 trees on Kīlauea were killed by lava flows from Puʻu ʻŌʻō in 1997-1998.

On Hōlei Pali, an escarpment on the south flank of Kīlauea, only 21 out of about 65 ʻahakea recorded in 1973 were relocated in the early 1990s. Of these surviving trees, the majority were in poor condition and declining, with dead tree tops, dead branches, and burnt leaf tips from sulfur dioxide fumes. A 1993-95 survey to locate and map rare plants in the HVNP counted 46 total mature ʻahakea trees growing across several different kīpuka, 36 of which fell within the Nāulu forest remnant area, but found no seedlings. A 17-month monitoring project from 2006 to 2007 located 24 of the Nāulu forest trees. Of these relocated trees, only 16 still survived (just over half of which demonstrated either no growth or a decrease in trunk diameter), showing a 33% mortality rate over 13 years. No natural regeneration of ʻahakea has been observed in the HVNP.

One of the most significant threats to species survival is the apparent lack of natural recruitment of seedlings to replace dead adult trees in studied populations. No seedlings or young trees (trunk diameter <10 cm) have been identified by surveyors to date, and planted seedlings fare poorly, with attempted plantings thus far exhibiting poor growth and a 100% mortality rate after several years. Seeds sown near existing adult trees have shown no germination, although a moderately high germination rate for recently collected seeds sown in greenhouse conditions has been recorded.

Rodent predation on seeds or the tree itself is rare, and viable seed is produced by existing trees. The decline of existing trees in HVNP, along with the lack of natural seedlings and apparent 100% mortality rate of planted seedlings, could indicate that the highly disturbed, dry, and fragmented forest environments resulting from volcanic activity are unfavorable for ʻahakea. ʻAhakea was observed in the 1980s in wet forest habitat on a kīpuka later destroyed by lava and in the 1990s in mesic to wet forest in Kīlauea's East Rift, suggesting that soil moisture is likely a significant factor in the lack of regeneration. Existing populations in decline in the HVNP may have established under wetter, less fragmented conditions. Future conservation efforts may prioritize the selection of wetter sites within the ʻahakea's range for planting seedlings.
