= Tournefortiopsis =

Scientific classification
- Kingdom: Plantae
- Clade: Tracheophytes
- Clade: Angiosperms
- Clade: Eudicots
- Clade: Asterids
- Order: Gentianales
- Family: Rubiaceae
- Subfamily: Cinchonoideae
- Tribe: Guettardeae
- Genus: Tournefortiopsis; Rusby (1907)

Species
- 12; see text

Genus of flowering plants

Tournefortiopsis is a genus of flowering plants in the family Rubiaceae. It includes 12 species native to the tropical Americas, ranging from southeastern Mexico to Venezuela and Bolivia.

== Species ==
12 species are accepted:

- Tournefortiopsis conferta (Benth.) Borhidi
- Tournefortiopsis crassifolia (Standl. ex Steyerm.) C.M.Taylor & A.C.Berger
- Tournefortiopsis crispiflora (Vahl) Borhidi
- Tournefortiopsis cuatrecasasii (Standl. ex Steyerm.) C.M.Taylor
- Tournefortiopsis dependens (Ruiz & Pav.) Borhidi
- Tournefortiopsis deviana C.M.Taylor
- Tournefortiopsis hirsuta (Ruiz & Pav.) Borhidi
- Tournefortiopsis reticulata Rusby
- Tournefortiopsis robusta C.M.Taylor
- Tournefortiopsis sopkinii C.M.Taylor
- Tournefortiopsis tamboana C.M.Taylor
- Tournefortiopsis torrana (C.M.Taylor) C.M.Taylor
