= Tinadendron =

Scientific classification
- Kingdom: Plantae
- Clade: Tracheophytes
- Clade: Angiosperms
- Clade: Eudicots
- Clade: Asterids
- Order: Gentianales
- Family: Rubiaceae
- Subfamily: Cinchonoideae
- Tribe: Guettardeae
- Genus: Tinadendron; Achille

Genus of plants

Tinadendron is a genus of flowering plants belonging to the family Rubiaceae.

Its native range is Southwestern Pacific.

Species:

- Tinadendron kajewskii (Guillaumin) Achille
- Tinadendron noumeanum (Baill.) Achille
