= Tinadendron noumeanum =

Conservation status
- Critically Endangered (IUCN 3.1)

Scientific classification
- Kingdom: Plantae
- Clade: Tracheophytes
- Clade: Angiosperms
- Clade: Eudicots
- Clade: Asterids
- Order: Gentianales
- Family: Rubiaceae
- Genus: Tinadendron
- Species: T. noumeanum

Binomial name
- Tinadendron noumeanum (Baill.) Achille

Synonyms
- Guettarda noumeana Baill.

Species of plant

Tinadendron noumeanum is a species of plant in the family Rubiaceae. It is endemic to New Caledonia.
