= Machaonia erythrocarpa =

Scientific classification
- Kingdom: Plantae
- Clade: Tracheophytes
- Clade: Angiosperms
- Clade: Eudicots
- Clade: Asterids
- Order: Gentianales
- Family: Rubiaceae
- Genus: Machaonia
- Species: M. erythrocarpa

Binomial name
- Machaonia erythrocarpa (Standl.) Borhidi

Synonyms
- Allenanthus erythrocarpus Standl.

Species of plant

Machaonia erythrocarpa is a species of flowering plant in the family Rubiaceae, native from Mexico through Central America to Panama. It was first described by Paul Carpenter Standley in 1940 as Allenanthus erythrocarpus. Allenanthus hondurensis is a synonym of one of its subspecies.

== Subspecies ==
Three subspecies are recognized:

- Machaonia erythrocarpa subsp. erythrocarpa – Central America
- Machaonia erythrocarpa subsp. hondurensis (Standl.) Borhidi, syn. Allenanthus hondurensis Standl. – Mexico (Oaxaca, Chiapas) to Nicaragua
- Machaonia erythrocarpa subsp. parvifolia (L.O.Williams) Borhidi – Mexico

== Conservation ==
Allenanthus hondurensis was assessed as "vulnerable" in the 1998 IUCN Red List, where it is said to be native only to Honduras and Mexico. As of February 2023, A. hondurensis was regarded as a synonym of Machaonia erythrocarpa subsp. hondurensis, which has a wider distribution, including El Salvador and Guatemala.
