= Machaonia woodburyana =

Conservation status
- Endangered (IUCN 3.1)

Scientific classification
- Kingdom: Plantae
- Clade: Tracheophytes
- Clade: Angiosperms
- Clade: Eudicots
- Clade: Asterids
- Order: Gentianales
- Family: Rubiaceae
- Genus: Machaonia
- Species: M. woodburyana

Binomial name
- Machaonia woodburyana Acev.-Rodr.

Species of plant

Machaonia woodburyana, the alfilerillo, is a species of plant in the family Rubiaceae. It is found in Saint John in the United States Virgin Islands and Virgin Gorda in the British Virgin Islands in the Caribbean.

== Habitat ==
The natural habitats of Machaonia woodburyana are subtropical or tropical dry forests and subtropical or tropical dry shrubland. It is threatened by habitat loss.

== See also ==
- Tropical and subtropical dry broadleaf forests - biome
