= Arachnothryx fosbergii =

Conservation status
- Endangered (IUCN 3.1)

Scientific classification
- Kingdom: Plantae
- Clade: Tracheophytes
- Clade: Angiosperms
- Clade: Eudicots
- Clade: Asterids
- Order: Gentianales
- Family: Rubiaceae
- Genus: Arachnothryx
- Species: A. fosbergii

Binomial name
- Arachnothryx fosbergii Steyerm.

Species of plant

Arachnothryx fosbergii is a species of flowering plant in the family Rubiaceae. It is a shrub endemic to Ecuador.
