= Gonzalagunia bifida =

Conservation status
- Critically Endangered (IUCN 3.1)

Scientific classification
- Kingdom: Plantae
- Clade: Tracheophytes
- Clade: Angiosperms
- Clade: Eudicots
- Clade: Asterids
- Order: Gentianales
- Family: Rubiaceae
- Genus: Gonzalagunia
- Species: G. bifida

Binomial name
- Gonzalagunia bifida B.Ståhl

Species of plant

Gonzalagunia bifida is a species of plant in the family Rubiaceae. It is endemic to Ecuador.
