= Arachnothryx chimboracensis =

Conservation status
- Critically Endangered (IUCN 3.1)

Scientific classification
- Kingdom: Plantae
- Clade: Tracheophytes
- Clade: Angiosperms
- Clade: Eudicots
- Clade: Asterids
- Order: Gentianales
- Family: Rubiaceae
- Genus: Arachnothryx
- Species: A. chimboracensis

Binomial name
- Arachnothryx chimboracensis (Standl.) Steyerm.

Species of plant

Arachnothryx chimboracensis is a species of flowering plant in the family Rubiaceae. It is endemic to Ecuador.
