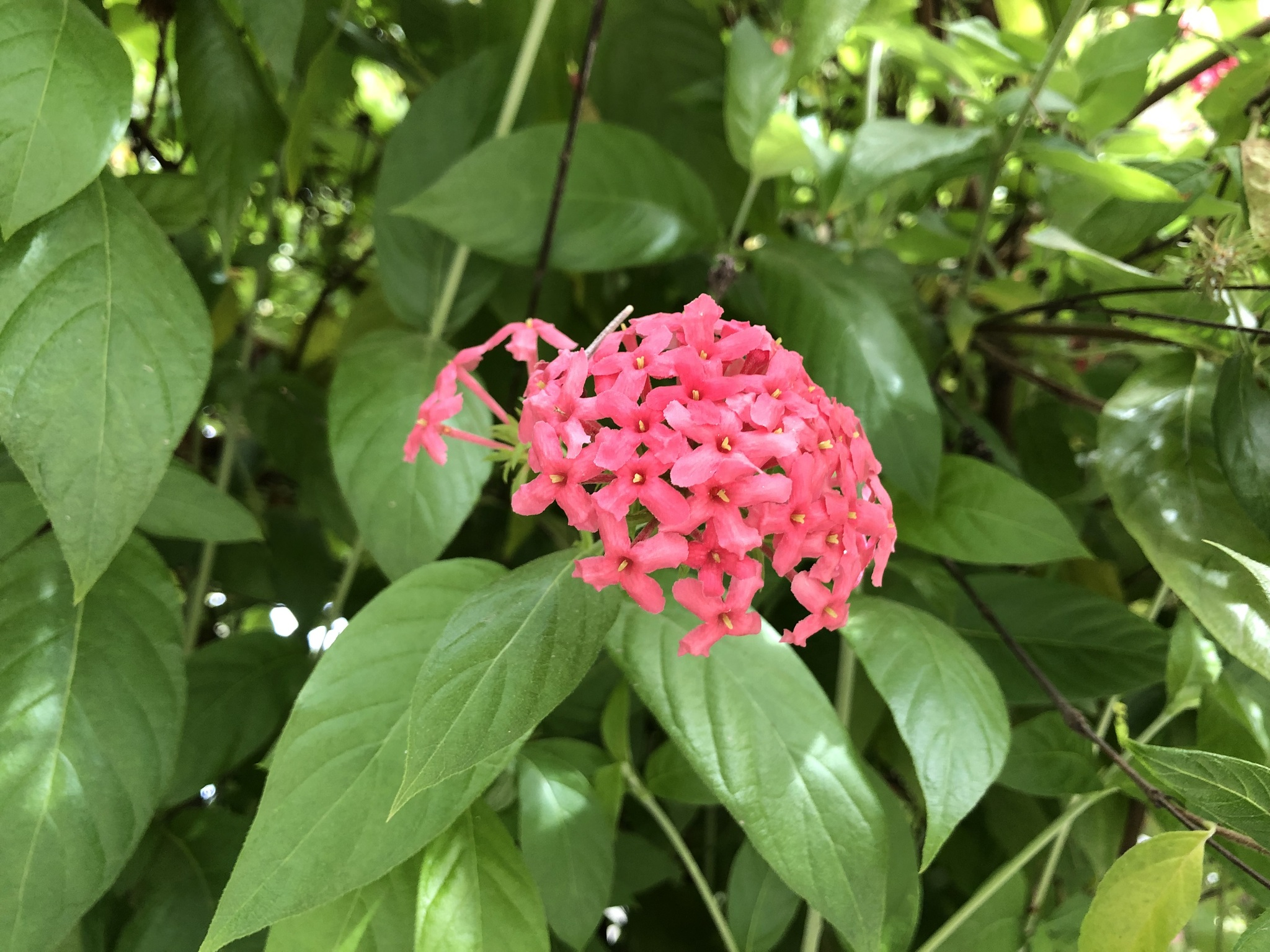

Scientific classification
- Kingdom: Plantae
- Clade: Tracheophytes
- Clade: Angiosperms
- Clade: Eudicots
- Clade: Asterids
- Order: Gentianales
- Family: Rubiaceae
- Genus: Arachnothryx
- Species: A. leucophylla

Binomial name
- Arachnothryx leucophylla (Kunth) Planch.

= Arachnothryx leucophylla =

Species of plant

Arachnothryx leucophylla is a species of flowering plant in the family Rubiaceae.

== Description ==
Arachnothryx calycosa is a woody evergreen shrub, typically growing between 1 and 3 metres (3 ft 3 in and 9 ft 10 in) in height. It generally has opposite, sessile leaves that are ovate to oblong in shape. The upper surface of the leaves is dark green and hairless, while the underside may be lighter in color with a pubescent texture. The flowers are tubular with lobes, often in shades of pink, and are arranged in rounded clusters known as cymose inflorescences. Some species in this genus are fragrant, particularly in the evening. The fruits are small, dry, and indehiscent, containing numerous seeds.
