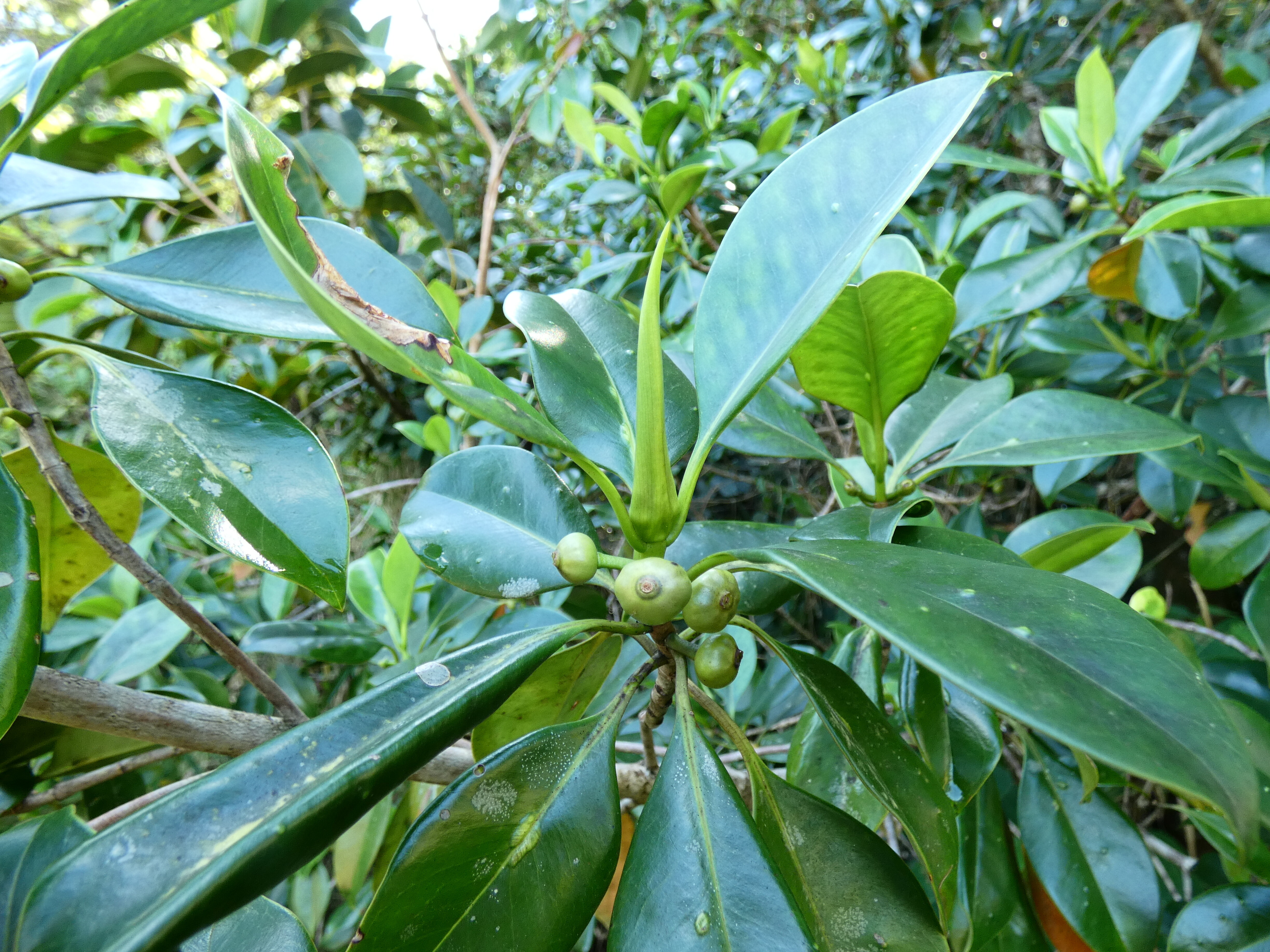
- Stipule, fruit and foliage

Conservation status
- Least Concern (IUCN 3.1)

Scientific classification
- Kingdom: Plantae
- Clade: Embryophytes
- Clade: Tracheophytes
- Clade: Angiosperms
- Clade: Eudicots
- Clade: Asterids
- Order: Gentianales
- Family: Rubiaceae
- Genus: Timonius
- Species: T. singularis

Binomial name
- Timonius singularis (F.Muell.) L.S.Sm.

Synonyms
- Abbottia singularis F.Muell.

= Timonius singularis =

Species of flowering plant

Timonius singularis, commonly known as false fig, is a species of plant in the family Rubiaceae, native to northeastern Queensland, Australia. It is an epiphyte in rainforest, and was first described in 1875. It has a conservation status of least concern.

== Description ==
Timonius singularis is an epiphyte shrub or tree up to 6 m (20 ft) tall. It can also grow as a lithophyte. The stipules are large and conspicuous, growing up to 5.5 cm (2.2 in) long. The leaves are glossy and hairless, and arranged in opposite pairs. They measure up to 12 cm (4.7 in) long by 4.5 cm (1.8 in) wide and the venation is indistinct.

The inflorescences are borne in the leaf axils and consist of either a single flower or a panicle of up to five flowers. The corolla tube is about 12 mm (0.5 in) long; the corolla lobes are about 7 mm (0.28 in) long with conspicuous longitudinal ridges. This species is dioecious, meaning that male and female flowers are borne on separate plants.

The fruit is a berry turning red or purple when ripe, and measuring about 10 mm (0.4 in) long and 15 mm (0.6 in) wide. They contain numerous pale seeds about 4 mm (0.16 in) long.

== Distribution and habitat ==
The false fig grows in rainforest as an epiphyte on other trees, or occasionally on boulders. It is mostly restricted to upland forests between Paluma Range National Park and Cooktown, with a small number of occurrences in outlying populations on Cape York Peninsula.

== Taxonomy ==
This species was first described by Victorian colonial botanist Ferdinand von Mueller in 1875, as Abbottia singularis. Mueller's description was based on a specimen collected by John Dallachy. It was transferred to its current name in 1957 by Lindsay Stuart Smith.

== Conservation ==
As of August 2026, this species has been assessed to be of least concern by the International Union for Conservation of Nature (IUCN) and in the Queensland government's Wildnet database. The IUCN supports its assessment by stating that the species has a wide distribution and that no immediate threats to the species are known. The Wildnet database does not provide any explanation for the assessments made.

== Gallery ==
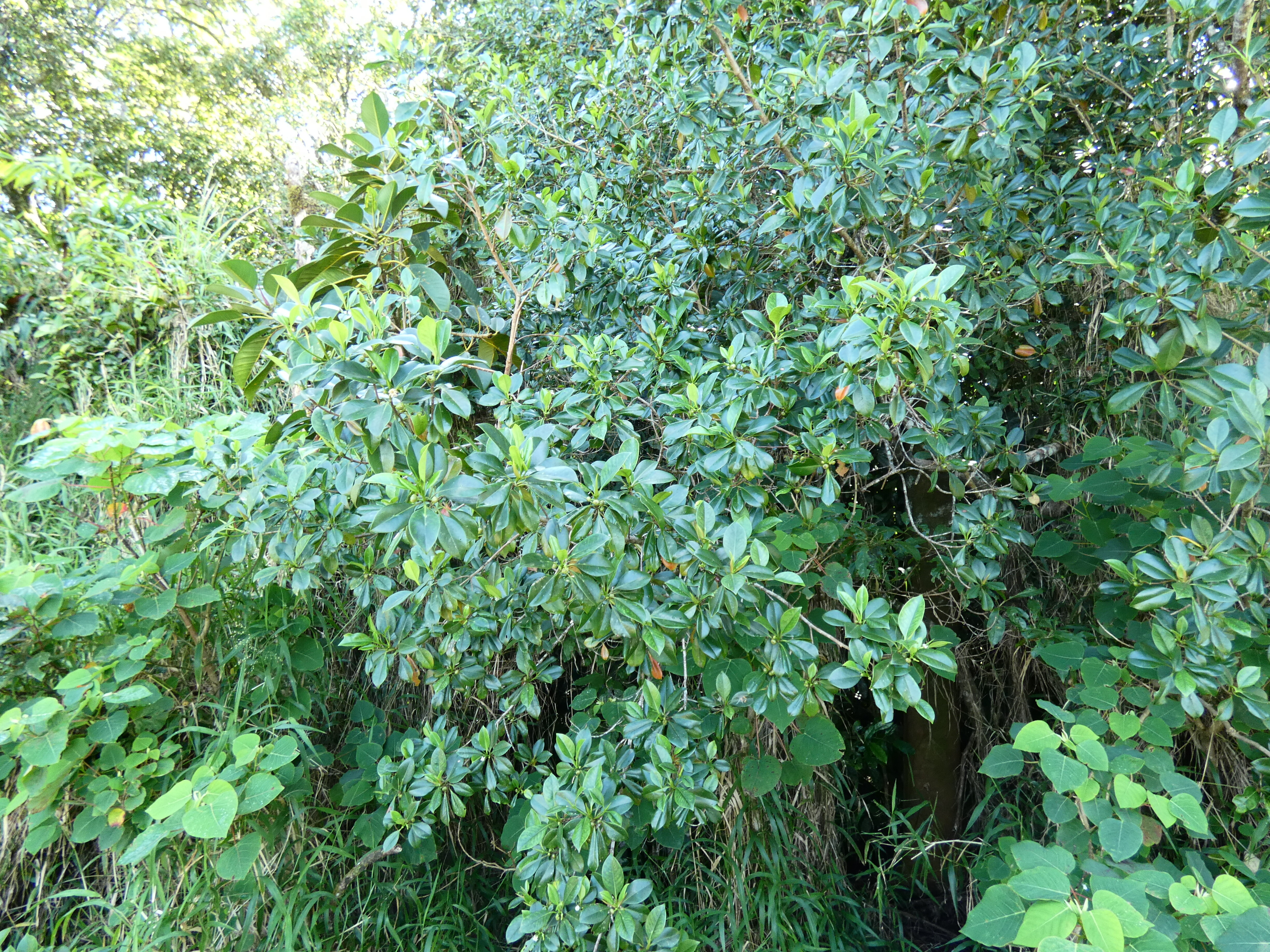
Habit

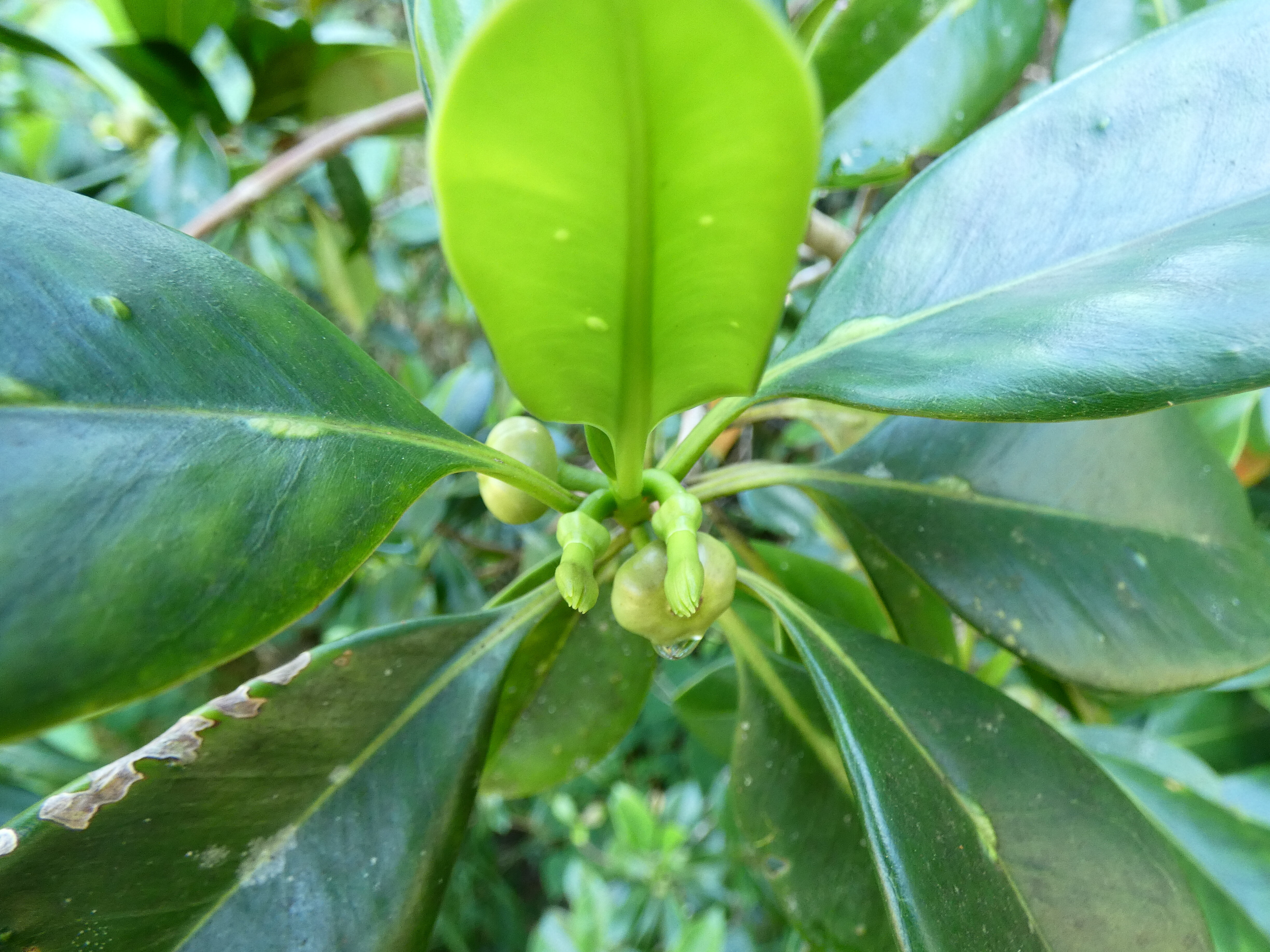
Flower buds, fruit and foliage

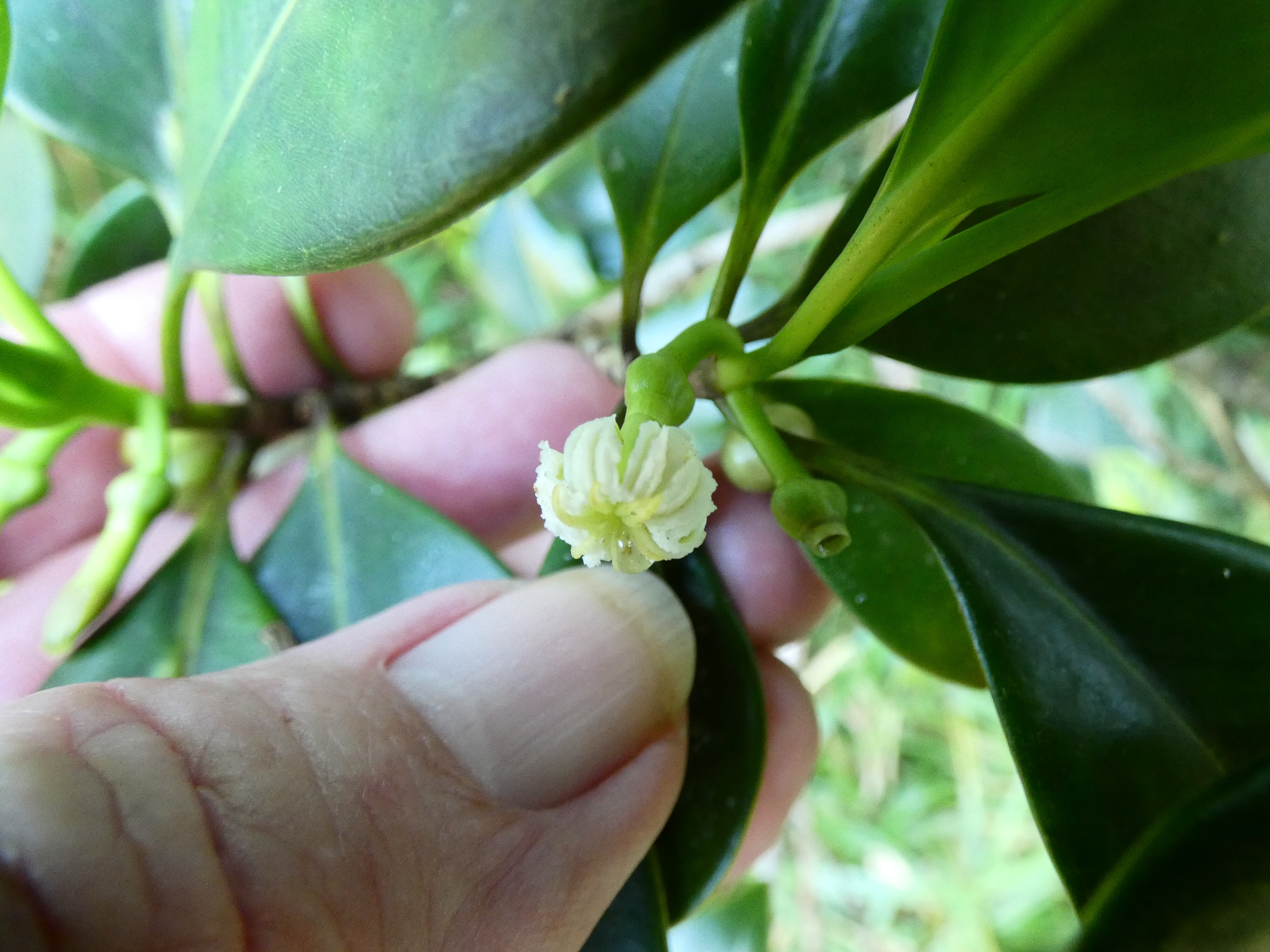
Flower
