= Gonzalagunia mollis =

Conservation status
- Critically Endangered (IUCN 3.1)

Scientific classification
- Kingdom: Plantae
- Clade: Tracheophytes
- Clade: Angiosperms
- Clade: Eudicots
- Clade: Asterids
- Order: Gentianales
- Family: Rubiaceae
- Genus: Gonzalagunia
- Species: G. mollis

Binomial name
- Gonzalagunia mollis Spruce ex K.Schum

Species of plant

Gonzalagunia mollis is a species of plant in the family Rubiaceae. It is endemic to Ecuador. It is critically endangered and its population trend is unspecified by the IUCN Red List.

== Sources ==
- Jaramillo, T.; Cornejo, X. & Pitman, N. (2004). "Gonzalagunia mollis". IUCN Red List of Threatened Species. 2004 e.T46023A11030157. doi:10.2305/IUCN.UK.2004.RLTS.T46023A11030157.en.
