= Renistipula galeottii =

Conservation status
- Critically Endangered (IUCN 3.1)

Scientific classification
- Kingdom: Plantae
- Clade: Tracheophytes
- Clade: Angiosperms
- Clade: Eudicots
- Clade: Asterids
- Order: Gentianales
- Family: Rubiaceae
- Subfamily: Cinchonoideae
- Tribe: Guettardeae
- Genus: Renistipula
- Species: R. galeottii

Binomial name
- Renistipula galeottii (Standl.) Borhidi (2004)

Synonyms
- Arachnothryx galeottii (Standl.) Borhidi (1982); Rondeletia galeottii Standl. (1918)

Species of plant

Renistipula galeottii is a species of flowering plant in the family Rubiaceae. It is small tree which grows from 8 to 12 metres tall, which is endemic to Chiapas, Oaxaca, Tabasco, and Veracruz in southern Mexico. It grows in lowland tropical rain forest up to 1,000 metres elevation.

The species was first described as Rondeletia galeottii by Paul Carpenter Standley in 1918. In 2004 Attila Borhidi placed the species in the newly-described genus Renistipula as R. galeottii.
