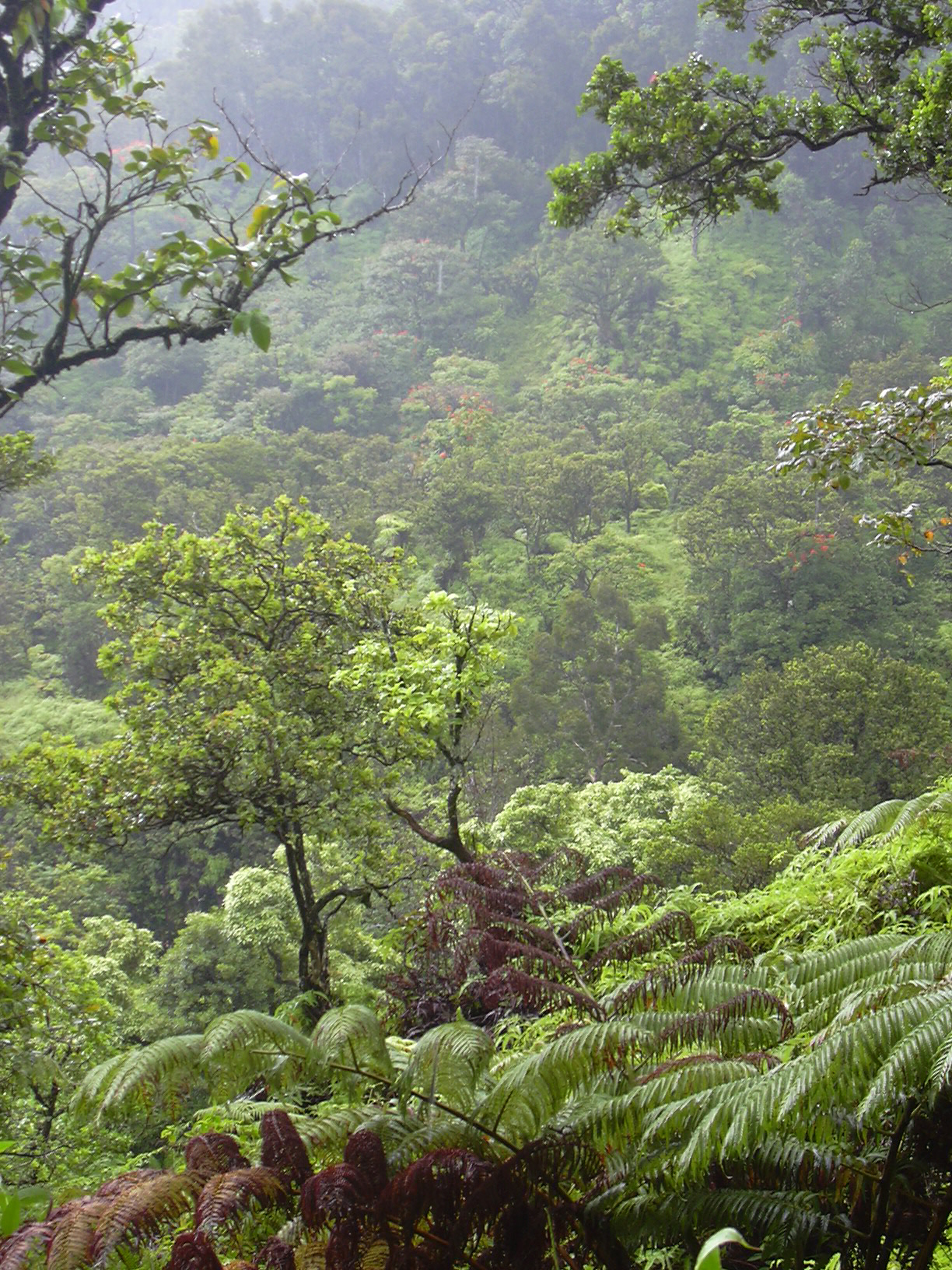
- Bobea gaudichaudii

Scientific classification
- Kingdom: Plantae
- Clade: Embryophytes
- Clade: Tracheophytes
- Clade: Angiosperms
- Clade: Eudicots
- Clade: Asterids
- Order: Gentianales
- Family: Rubiaceae
- Subfamily: Cinchonoideae
- Tribe: Guettardeae
- Genus: Bobea; Gaudichaud

Type species
- Bobea gaudichaudii (Cham. & Schltdl.) H.St.John & Herbst

Synonyms
- Bobaea A.Rich.; Obbea Hook.f.; Rytidotus Hook.f.

= Bobea =

Genus of flowering plants in the coffee family

Bobea is a genus of flowering plants in the family Rubiaceae. It includes five species, four of which are endemic to Hawaii and one to eastern Queensland in Australia. Bobea was named for Jean-Baptiste Bobe-Moreau by Charles Gaudichaud-Beaupré in 1830 in his book Voyage de l'Uranie.

The wood of Bobea is hard, wearable, and yellow. It was used for the gunwales of Polynesian voyaging canoes. The gunwales of modern canoes are sometimes painted yellow in imitation of the wood that is no longer widely available.

== Species ==
Five species are accepted.

- Bobea brevipes A.Gray – ʻAhakea lau liʻi (Kauaʻi, Oʻahu)
- Bobea elatior Gaudich. – ʻAhakea lau nui (Kauaʻi, Molokaʻi, Maui, island of Hawaiʻi)
- Bobea myrtoides (F.Muell.) Valeton – eastern Queensland
- Bobea sandwicensis (A.Gray) Hillebr. – ʻAhakea (Oʻahu, Molokaʻi, Lānaʻi, Maui)
- Bobea timonioides (Hook.f.) Hillebr. – ʻAhakea (Maui, island of Hawaiʻi)
