= Gonzalagunia pauciflora =

Conservation status
- Vulnerable (IUCN 3.1)

Scientific classification
- Kingdom: Plantae
- Clade: Tracheophytes
- Clade: Angiosperms
- Clade: Eudicots
- Clade: Asterids
- Order: Gentianales
- Family: Rubiaceae
- Genus: Gonzalagunia
- Species: G. pauciflora

Binomial name
- Gonzalagunia pauciflora B.Ståhl

Species of plant

Gonzalagunia pauciflora is a species of plant in the family Rubiaceae. It is endemic to Ecuador. The specific epithet pauciflora is Latin for 'few-flowered'.

== Sources ==
- Jaramillo, T.; Cornejo, X. & Pitman, N. (2004). "Gonzalagunia pauciflora". IUCN Red List of Threatened Species. 2004 e.T46024A11030233. doi:10.2305/IUCN.UK.2004.RLTS.T46024A11030233.en.
