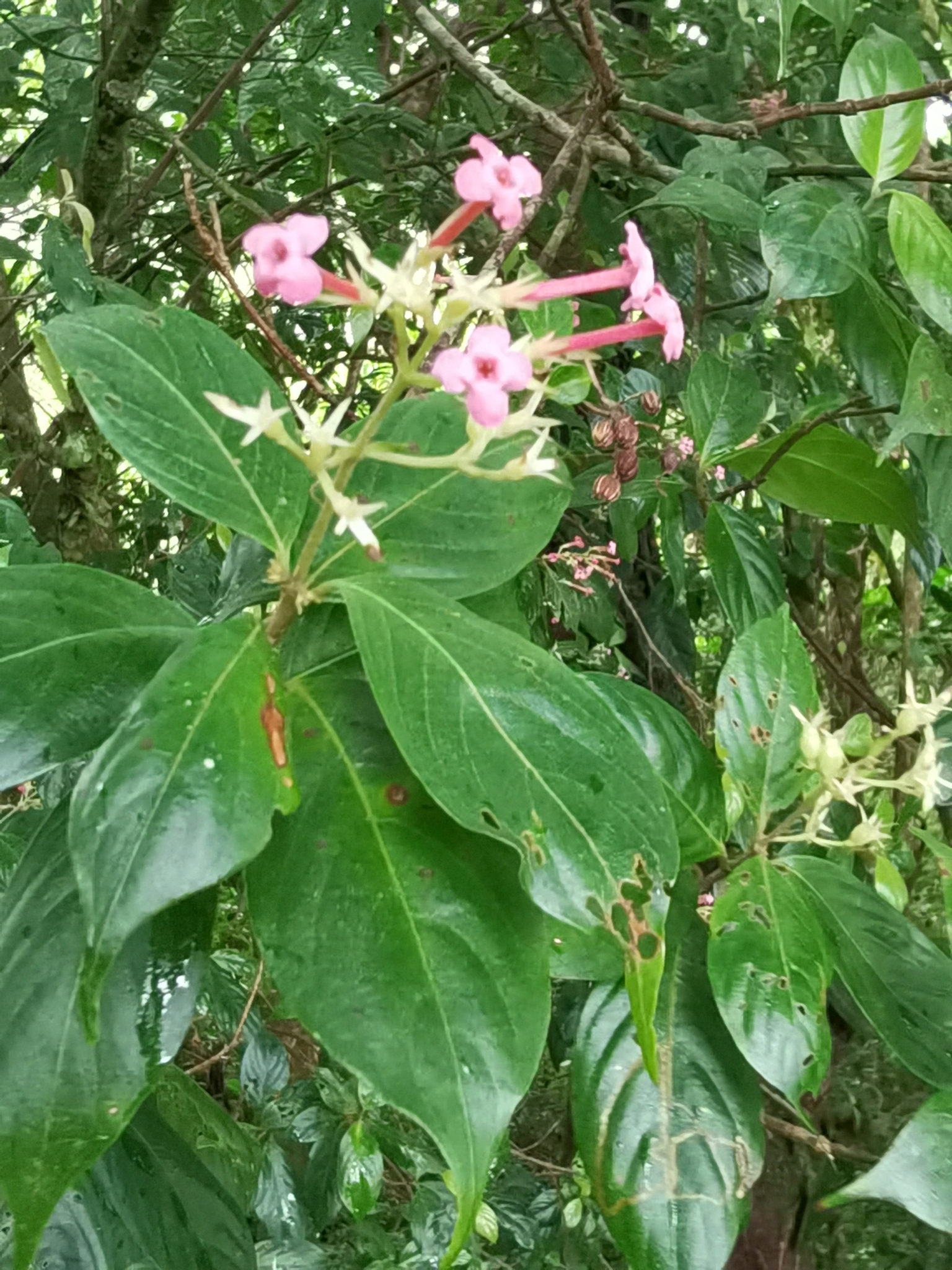

Conservation status
- Vulnerable (IUCN 3.1)

Scientific classification
- Kingdom: Plantae
- Clade: Tracheophytes
- Clade: Angiosperms
- Clade: Eudicots
- Clade: Asterids
- Order: Gentianales
- Family: Rubiaceae
- Genus: Arachnothryx
- Species: A. calycosa

Binomial name
- Arachnothryx calycosa A. Borhidi, 1982

Synonyms
- Rondeletia calycosa J.D. Smith

= Arachnothryx calycosa =

Species of plant

Arachnothryx calycosa is a plant species in the Rubiaceae family. It was originally classified as Rondeletia calycosa by John Donnell Smith in 1913. In 1982, Attila Borhidi reclassified it under the genus Arachnothryx, as part of a broader reorganization within the Rubiaceae family.

== Distribution ==
Arachnothryx calycosa is native to Costa Rica, where it typically grows in forested areas. The species is found at an elevation of approximately 1,459 metres (4,790 ft).
