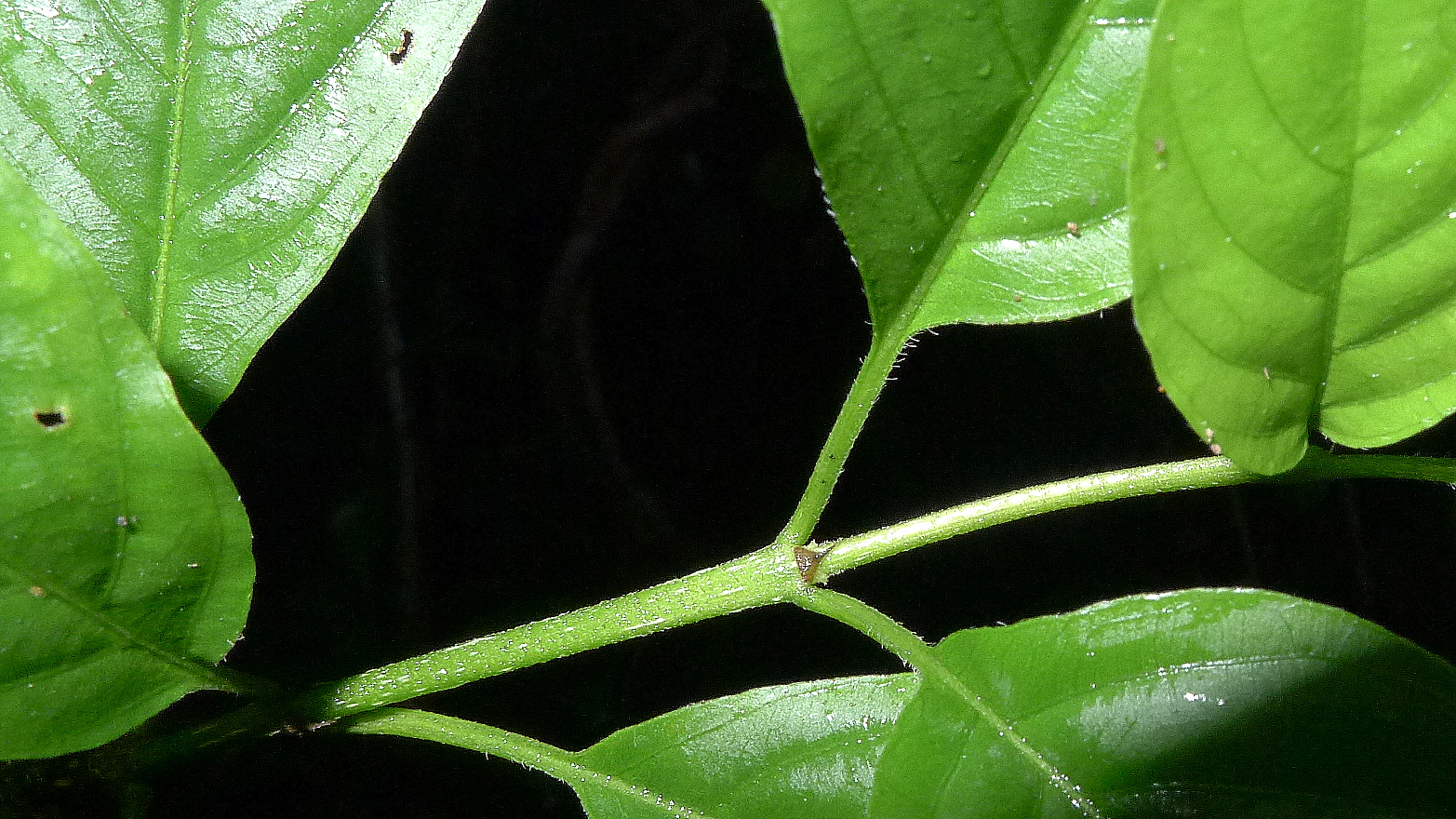
- Chomelia tenuiflora

Scientific classification
- Kingdom: Plantae
- Clade: Embryophytes
- Clade: Tracheophytes
- Clade: Spermatophytes
- Clade: Angiosperms
- Clade: Eudicots
- Clade: Asterids
- Order: Gentianales
- Family: Rubiaceae
- Subfamily: Cinchonoideae
- Tribe: Guettardeae
- Genus: Chomelia; Jacq.

Type species
- Chomelia spinosa Jacq.

Synonyms
- Anisomeris C.Presl; Caruelina Kuntze

= Chomelia =

Genus of flowering plants

Chomelia is a genus of flowering plants in the family Rubiaceae. It is native to Mexico, Central America, the West Indies and much of South America as far south as Argentina.

== Species ==
- Chomelia albicaulis (Rusby) Steyerm. - Bolivia
- Chomelia anisomeris Müll.Arg. - eastern Brazil
- Chomelia apodantha (Standl.) Steyerm. - Bolivia
- Chomelia bahiae J.H.Kirkbr. - Bahia
- Chomelia barbata Standl. - Mexico
- Chomelia barbinervis Moric. ex Benth. - northern and south-eastern Brazil
- Chomelia bella (Standl.) Steyerm. - south-eastern Brazil
- Chomelia boliviana Standl. - Bolivia
- Chomelia brachypoda Donn.Sm. - Mexico, Guatemala, Honduras
- Chomelia brasiliana A.Rich. - Brazil
- Chomelia breedlovei Borhidi - Chiapas
- Chomelia brevicornu Rusby - Bolivia, Peru
- Chomelia caurensis (Standl.) Steyerm. - Bolívar (state)
- Chomelia chiquitensis C.M.Taylor - Santa Cruz
- Chomelia costaricensis C.M.Taylor - Costa Rica
- Chomelia crassifolia Borhidi - Oaxaca, Tabasco
- Chomelia delascioi Steyerm. - Bolívar (state)
- Chomelia dimorpha Rusby - Bolivia
- Chomelia ecuadorensis (K.Schum. & K.Krause) Steyerm. - Colombia, Ecuador
- Chomelia estrellana Müll.Arg. - Rio de Janeiro (state)
- Chomelia fasciculata (Sw.) Sw. - western Cuba, Jamaica, Windward Islands
- Chomelia glabricalyx Steyerm. - Bolívar (state)
- Chomelia glabriuscula Steyerm. - Venezuela, French Guiana
- Chomelia gracilis K.Schum. ex Glaziou - south-eastern Brazil
- Chomelia grandicarpa Dwyer - Panama
- Chomelia grandifolia (Huber) Steyerm. - northern and south-eastern Brazil
- Chomelia hirsuta Gardner - northern and south-eastern Brazil
- Chomelia intercedens Müll.Arg. - Brazil
- Chomelia juruensis (Standl.) Steyerm. - northern Brazil
- Chomelia kirkbridei Delprete - Federal District (Brazil), Goias
- Chomelia klugii (Standl.) Steyerm. - Colombia, Peru, northern Brazil
- Chomelia laxiflora (Standl.) Govaerts - Colombia
- Chomelia longiflora (Standl. ex Steyerm.) Steyerm. - Colombia
- Chomelia longituba (Borhidi) Borhidi - Veracruz, Chiapas
- Chomelia malaneoides Müll.Arg. - Guyana, Venezuela, Bolivia, Colombia, Ecuador, Peru, Brazil
- Chomelia microloba Donn.Sm. - Costa Rica, Panama, Colombia
- Chomelia minutiflora Glaz. - Minas Gerais
- Chomelia modesta (Standl.) Steyerm. - south-eastern Sao Paulo (state)
- Chomelia monachinoi Steyerm. - Venezuela
- Chomelia monantha (Standl. ex Steyerm.) Steyerm. - Rio de Janeiro (state)
- Chomelia multiflora Rusby - Bolivia, Guyana
- Chomelia myrtifolia S.Moore - Mato Grosso
- Chomelia obtusa Cham. & Schltdl. - Guyana, Venezuela, Brazil, Argentina, Paraguay, Uruguay
- Chomelia occidentalis Müll.Arg. - west-central Brazil
- Chomelia oligantha Müll.Arg. - eastern Brazil
- Chomelia paniculata (Bartl. ex DC.) Steyerm. - Guyana, Venezuela, Colombia, Peru, Brazil
- Chomelia parviflora (Müll.Arg.) Müll.Arg. - Brazil
- Chomelia parvifolia (Standl.) Govaerts - Brazil
- Chomelia pedunculosa Benth. - Brazil
- Chomelia pohliana Müll.Arg. - Brazil, Paraguay
- Chomelia polyantha S.F.Blake - Guyana, Venezuela, Colombia, Ecuador, Brazil
- Chomelia pringlei S.Watson - San Luis Potosí
- Chomelia psilocarpa Dwyer & M.V.Hayden - Panama, north-western Colombia
- Chomelia pubescens Cham. & Schltdl. - eastern Brazil
- Chomelia ramiae Steyerm. - Apure
- Chomelia randioides (Standl.) Steyerm. - Ceará
- Chomelia rauwolfioides (Standl.) Steyerm. - Bolivia
- Chomelia recordii Standl. - Costa Rica, Guatemala, Honduras, Nicaragua, Panama, Colombia
- Chomelia ribesioides Benth. ex A.Gray - Bolivia, Brazil
- Chomelia rubra Lorence & C.M.Taylor - Panama
- Chomelia rudis (Standl.) Lorence - Honduras
- Chomelia schomburgkii Steyerm. - Guyana
- Chomelia sericea Müll.Arg. - Brazil
- Chomelia sessilis Müll.Arg. - Brazil
- Chomelia spinosa Jacq. - southern Mexico to tropical South America
- Chomelia splitgerberi Bremek. - Guyana, Suriname
- Chomelia stergiosii Steyerm. - Bolívar (state)
- Chomelia tenuiflora Benth. - Costa Rica to tropical South America
- Chomelia torrana C.M.Taylor - Chocó
- Chomelia transiens Müll.Arg. - Rio de Janeiro (state)
- Chomelia triantha Standl. - Boyacá
- Chomelia triflora (J.H.Kirkbr.) Delprete & Achille - French Guiana
- Chomelia tristis Müll.Arg. - Rio de Janeiro (state)
- Chomelia ulei (K.Krause) Achille & Delprete - Peru
- Chomelia venezuelensis Steyerm. - Venezuela
- Chomelia venulosa W.C.Burger & C.M.Taylor - Costa Rica, Panama
- Chomelia volubilis (Standl.) Steyerm. - Amazonas
- Chomelia vulpina Müll.Arg. - Rio de Janeiro (state)
