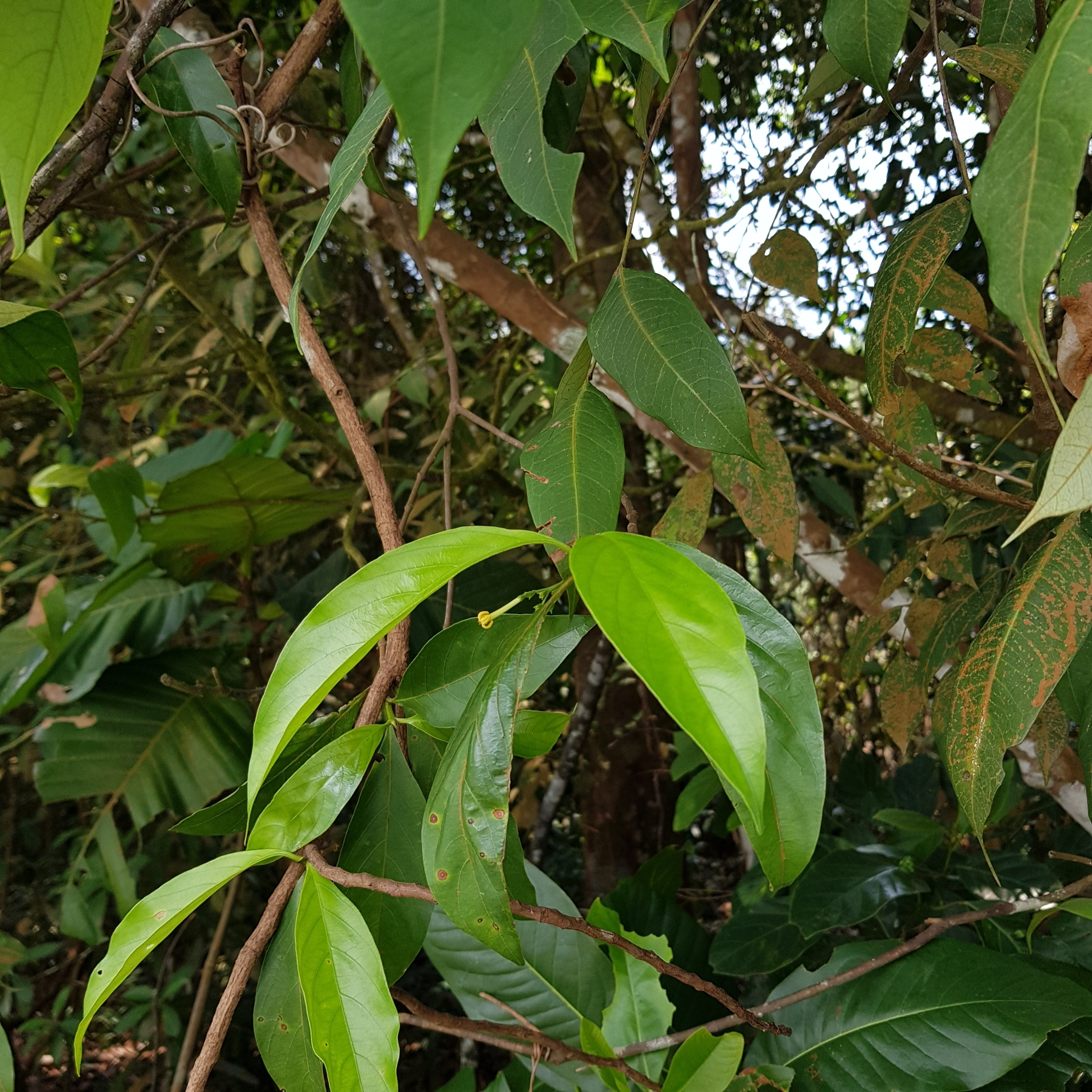

Conservation status
- Least Concern (IUCN 3.1)

Scientific classification
- Kingdom: Plantae
- Clade: Tracheophytes
- Clade: Angiosperms
- Clade: Eudicots
- Clade: Asterids
- Order: Gentianales
- Family: Rubiaceae
- Genus: Timonius
- Species: T. flavescens

Binomial name
- Timonius flavescens (Jack) Baker

Synonyms
- Synonymy: Antirhea borneensis Valeton; Bobea glabra (Wight & Arn.) Korth.; Bobea inaequisepala Miq.; Bobea mutabilis Korth.; Bobea sericantha Miq.; Bobea sericantha f. glabrior Miq.; Eupyrena glabra Wight & Arn.; Guettarda brunonis Wall. ex G.Don; Guettarda missionis Wall. ex G.Don; Guettarda peduncularis Wall. ex G.Don; Guettarda pervilleana Baill.; Helospora flavescens Jack (1824); Polyphragmon flavescens (Jack) Kurz; Polyphragmon flavescens var. macrocarpum Kurz; Polyphragmon mutabile (Korth.) Miq.; Polyphragmon sericanthum (Miq.) Miq.; Timonius jambosella Thwaites; Timonius koenigii Blume ex Korth.; Timonius mutabilis (Korth.) Walp.; Timonius peduncularis (Wall. ex G.Don) Ridl.; Timonius sechellensis Summerh.; Timonius sericanthus (Miq.) Boerl.; Timonius sericanthus var. inaequisepalus (Miq.) Boerl.

= Timonius flavescens =

Species of plant

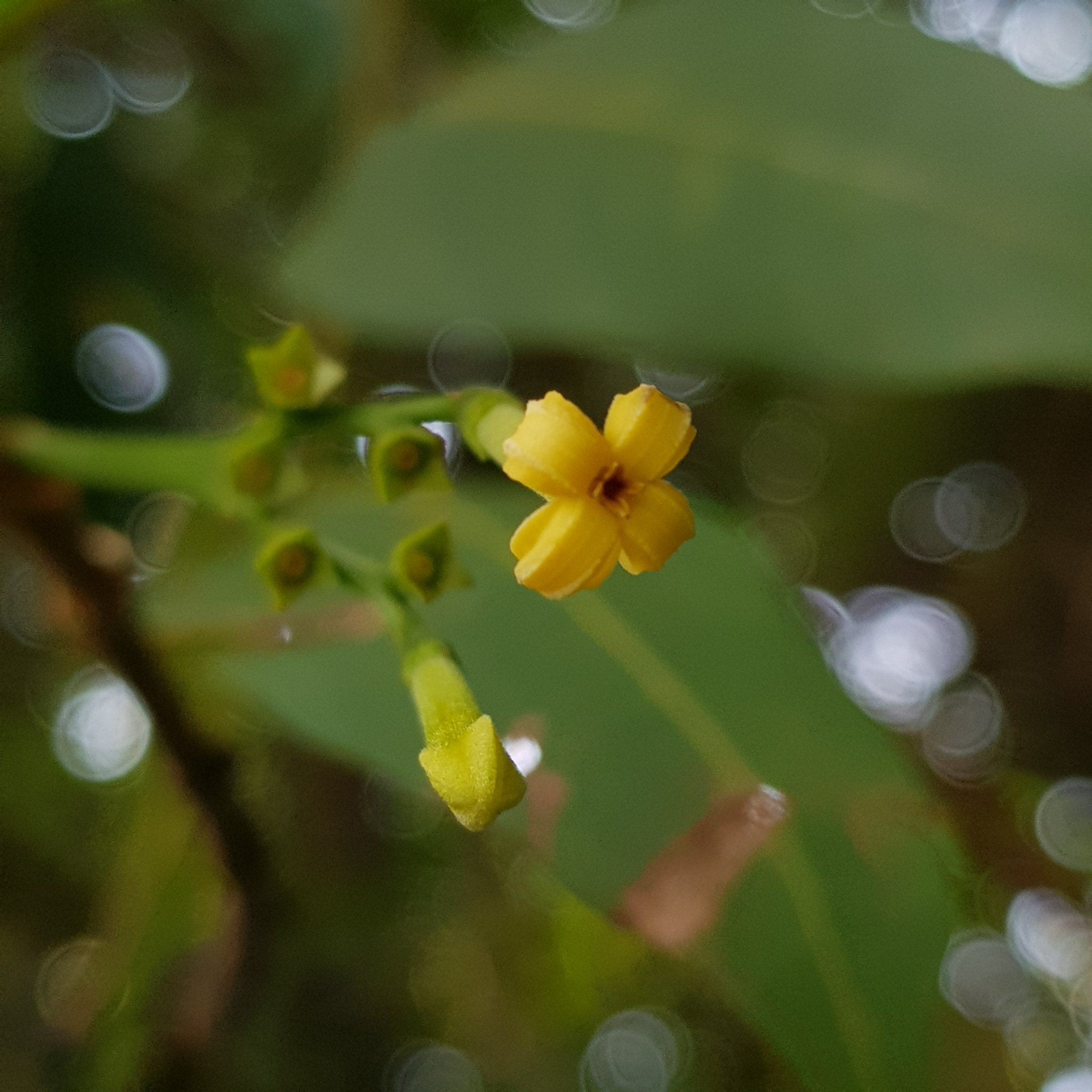
Close-up of flower

Timonius flavescens is a species of flowering plant in the family Rubiaceae. It a shrub or tree which ranges from the Seychelles to Indochina, western Malesia, and Papuasia.
