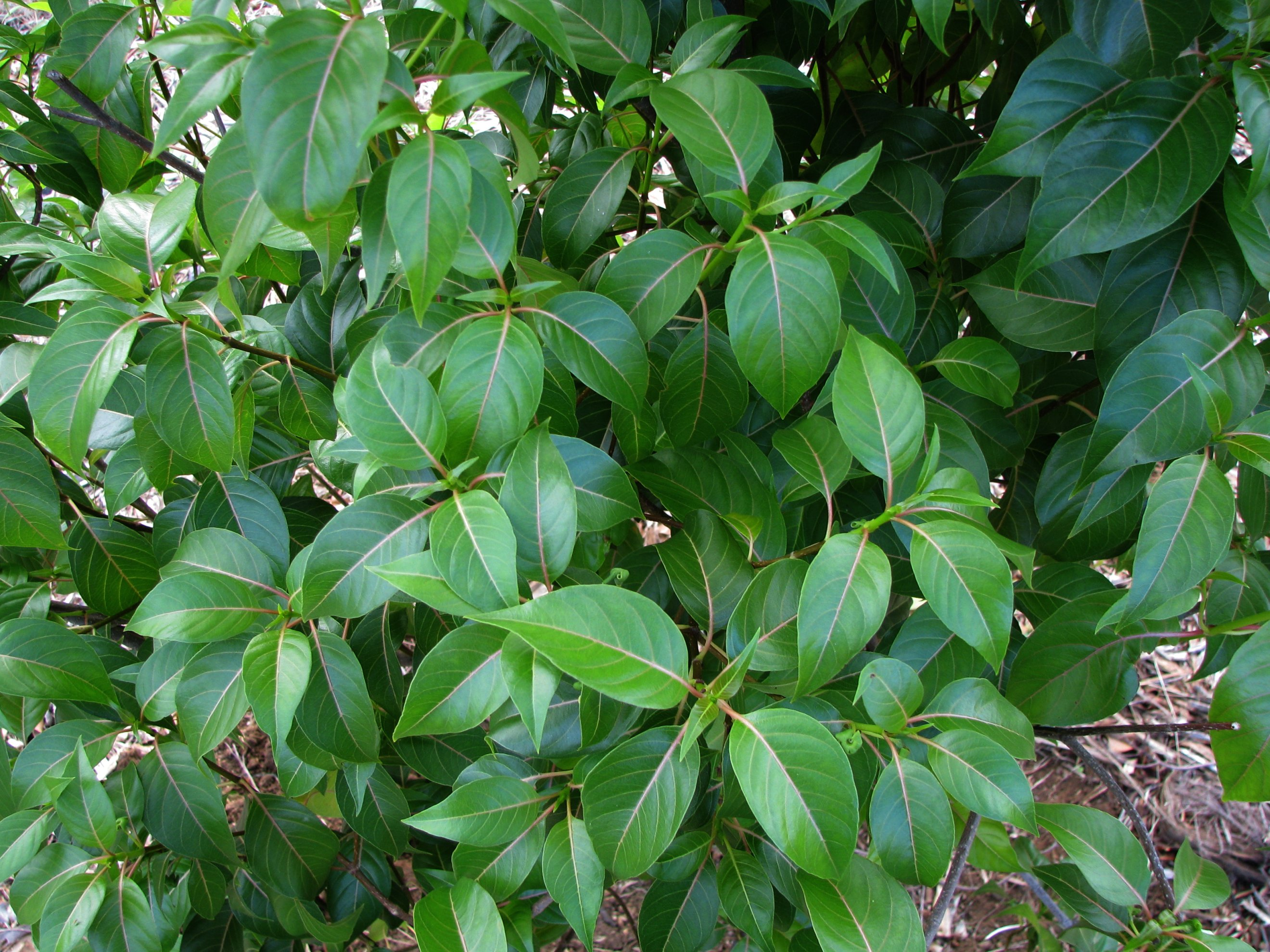

Conservation status
- Vulnerable (IUCN 3.1)

- Critically Imperiled (NatureServe)

Scientific classification
- Kingdom: Plantae
- Clade: Tracheophytes
- Clade: Angiosperms
- Clade: Eudicots
- Clade: Asterids
- Order: Gentianales
- Family: Rubiaceae
- Genus: Bobea
- Species: B. sandwicensis

Binomial name
- Bobea sandwicensis (A.Gray) Hillebr.

= Bobea sandwicensis =

ʻAhakea

Species of plant

ʻAhakea or Hawaiʻi dogweed (Bobea sandwicensis) is a species of flowering tree in the coffee family, Rubiaceae, that is endemic to Hawaiʻi. It inhabits lava plains as well as dry, coastal mesic and mixed mesic forests at elevations of 100–1,220 metres (330–4,000 ft) on the islands of Oʻahu, Molokaʻi, Lānaʻi, and Maui. It is threatened both by habitat loss and competition from invasive species.

== Description ==
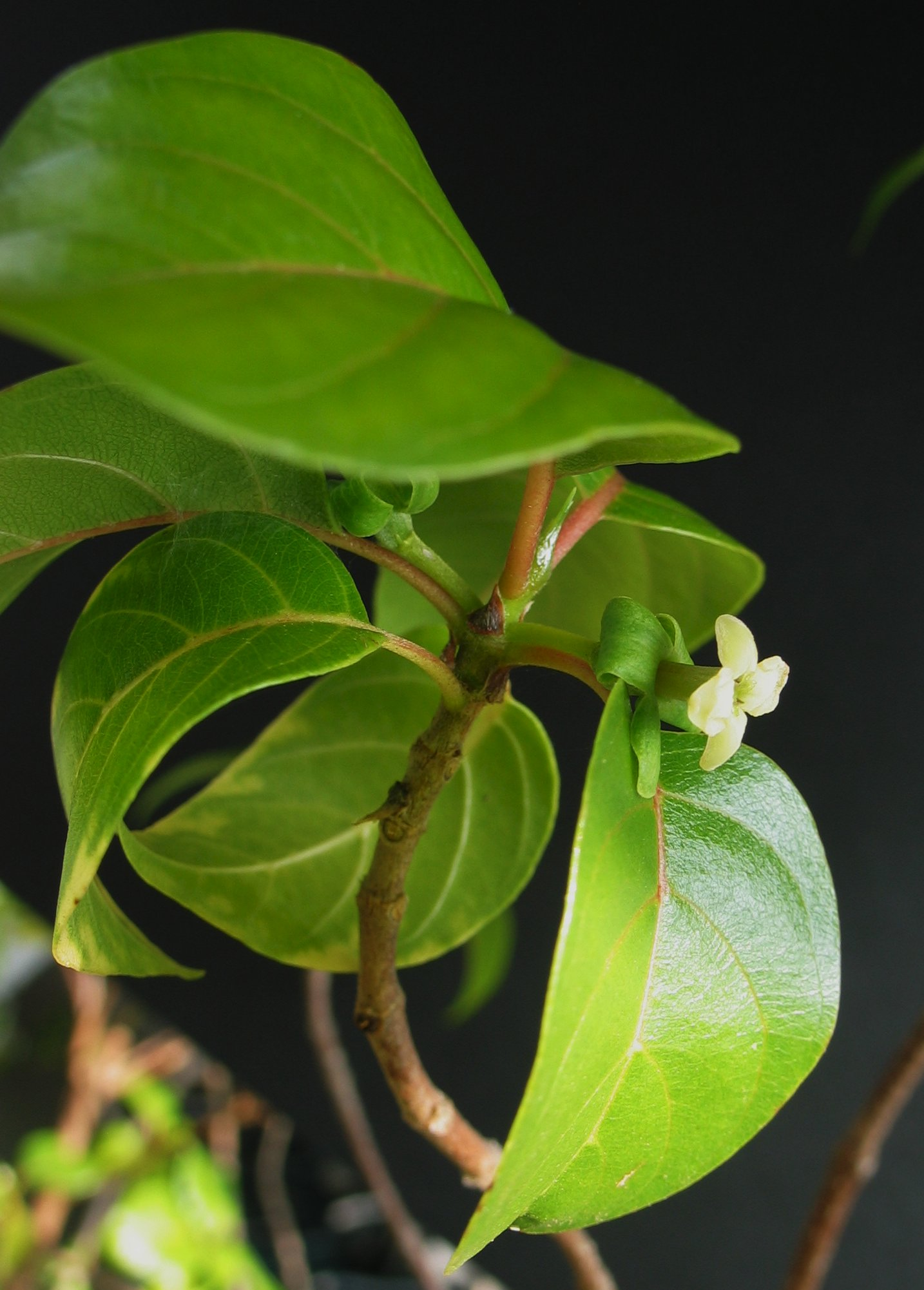
Bobea sandwicensis branch and flower

The perennial tree is around 30 feet tall. The simple leaves are opposite. The drupe fruit is purplish to black in color. The flower color ranges from greenish to yellowish to white. It can bloom any time of the year. 1 to 7 flowers are at the base of the leaves. The smooth bark is gray and scaly. The inner bark is light brown and bitter. The twigs are light brown and has tiny hairs. The leaves have pink hairy leafstalks. The upper surface of the leaves is shiny green with pinkish midveins and curved side veins. The round fruit is slightly shiny and has tiny hairs. The fruit contains 2-6 nutlets, and each nut has one seed.
