= Stenostomum (plant) =

Scientific classification
- Kingdom: Plantae
- Clade: Tracheophytes
- Clade: Angiosperms
- Clade: Eudicots
- Clade: Asterids
- Order: Gentianales
- Family: Rubiaceae
- Subfamily: Cinchonoideae
- Tribe: Guettardeae
- Genus: Stenostomum; C.F.Gaertn.

Species
- See text.

Synonyms
- Laugeria Vahl ex Benth. & Hook.f., nom. illeg.; Neolaugeria Nicolson; Resinanthus (Borhidi) Borhidi; Sturmia C.F.Gaertn.; Terebraria Sessé ex Kuntze

Genus of plants

Stenostomum is a genus of flowering plant in the family Rubiaceae, native from southern Mexico to tropical South America. The genus was established by Karl Friedrich von Gaertner in 1806.

== Species ==
As of January 2023, Plants of the World Online accepted the following species:

- Stenostomum abbreviatum (Urb.) Borhidi & M.Fernández
- Stenostomum acreanum (K.Krause) Achille & Delprete
- Stenostomum acutatum DC.
- Stenostomum albobrunneum (Urb. & Ekman) Borhidi
- Stenostomum apiculatum Britton & Standl.
- Stenostomum aristatum Britton
- Stenostomum aromaticum (Cast.-Campos & Lorence) Borhidi
- Stenostomum baracoense Borhidi
- Stenostomum biflorum Borhidi
- Stenostomum cahosianum (Urb. & Ekman) Borhidi
- Stenostomum coriaceum (Vahl) Griseb.
- Stenostomum cuspidatum Borhidi
- Stenostomum darienense (Dwyer) C.M.Taylor
- Stenostomum densiflorum C.Wright ex Griseb.
- Stenostomum ekmanii (Borhidi) Borhidi
- Stenostomum ellipticum (Urb. & Ekman) Borhidi
- Stenostomum granulatum Griseb.
- Stenostomum guianensis (Bremek.) Delprete & Achille
- Stenostomum heteroneurum (Urb. & Ekman) Borhidi
- Stenostomum imbricatum Borhidi
- Stenostomum involucratum (Urb. & Ekman) Borhidi
- Stenostomum jamaicense (Urb.) Borhidi
- Stenostomum lucidum (Sw.) C.F.Gaertn.
- Stenostomum maestrense (Urb.) Borhidi & M.Fernández
- Stenostomum minutifolium (Borhidi & Capote) Borhidi & M.Fernández
- Stenostomum mucronatum (Urb.) Borhidi & M.Fernández
- Stenostomum multinerve (Urb.) Borhidi & M.Fernández
- Stenostomum myrtifolium Griseb.
- Stenostomum nipense (Borhidi & O.Muñiz) Borhidi & M.Fernández
- Stenostomum obtusifolium (Urb.) Britton & P.Wilson
- Stenostomum occidentale (Urb.) Borhidi & M.Fernández
- Stenostomum oliganthum (Urb.) Borhidi
- Stenostomum ophiticola (Alain) Borhidi & M.Fernández
- Stenostomum orbiculare (Alain) Borhidi & M.Fernández
- Stenostomum pedicellare (Borhidi & Bisse) Borhidi & M.Fernández
- Stenostomum pitonianum (Urb. & Ekman) Borhidi
- Stenostomum portoricense Britton & P.Wilson
- Stenostomum radiatum Griseb.
- Stenostomum resinosum (Vahl) Griseb.
- Stenostomum reticulare Borhidi & M.Fernández
- Stenostomum revolutum Borhidi
- Stenostomum rotundatum Griseb.
- Stenostomum scrobiculatum (Urb.) Borhidi & M.Fernández
- Stenostomum shaferi (Urb.) Borhidi & M.Fernández
- Stenostomum sintenisii (Urb.) Britton & P.Wilson
- Stenostomum tomentosum (Sw.) DC.
- Stenostomum turrialbanum (N.Zamora & Poveda) C.M.Taylor
- Stenostomum urbanianum (C.T.White) Borhidi & M.Fernández
