= Stenostomum aromaticum =

Conservation status
- Endangered (IUCN 3.1)

Scientific classification
- Kingdom: Plantae
- Clade: Tracheophytes
- Clade: Angiosperms
- Clade: Eudicots
- Clade: Asterids
- Order: Gentianales
- Family: Rubiaceae
- Genus: Stenostomum
- Species: S. aromaticum

Binomial name
- Stenostomum aromaticum (Cast.-Campos & Lorence) Borhidi

Synonyms
- Antirhea aromatica Cast.-Campos & Lorence; Resinanthus aromaticus (Cast.-Campos & Lorence) Borhidi

Species of plant

Stenostomum aromaticum, synonym Antirhea aromatica, is a species of plant in the family Rubiaceae. It is endemic to eastern Mexico (the states of Oaxaca and Veracruz). It is an endangered species, threatened by habitat loss.
