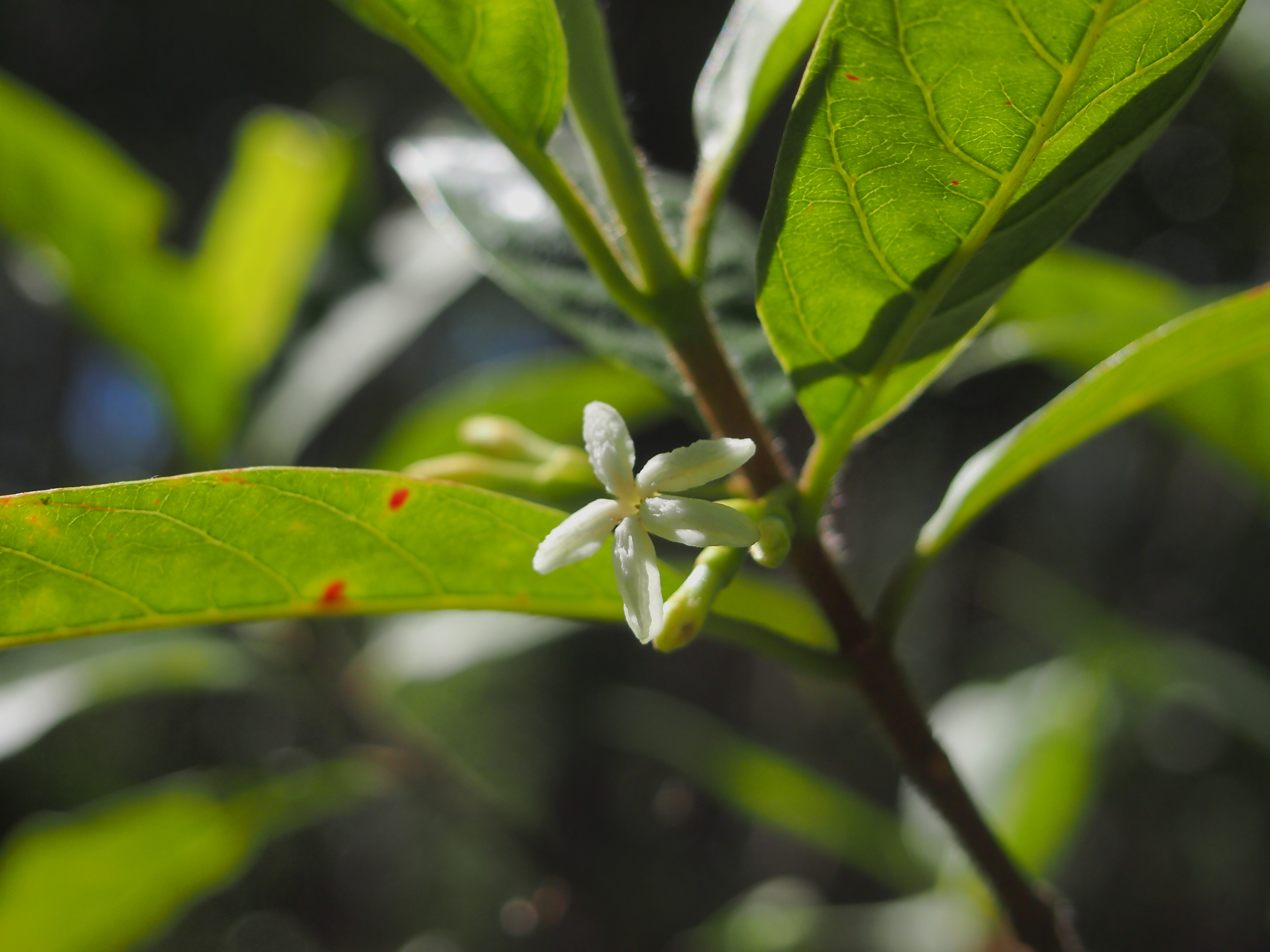

Conservation status
- Least Concern (IUCN 3.1)

Scientific classification
- Kingdom: Plantae
- Clade: Tracheophytes
- Clade: Angiosperms
- Clade: Eudicots
- Clade: Asterids
- Order: Gentianales
- Family: Rubiaceae
- Genus: Timonius
- Species: T. timon

Binomial name
- Timonius timon (Spreng.) Merr.

Varieties
- 5; see text

Synonyms
- Erithalis timon Spreng. (1813); Nelitris timon (Spreng.) Britten; Timonius rumphii DC.

= Timonius timon =

Species of flowering plant

Timonius timon is a species of flowering plant in the family Rubiaceae. It is a shrub or tree native to eastern Malesia (Java, the Lesser Sunda Islands, Sulawesi, and Maluku), Papuasia (New Guinea, the Bismarck Archipelago, and Solomon Islands) and northern Australia (Northern Territory, Queensland, and Western Australia), where it typically grows in lowland rain forest.

The species was first described as Erithalis timon by Kurt Polycarp Joachim Sprengel in 1813. In 1937 Elmer Drew Merrill placed the species in genus Timonius as T. timon.

== Varieties ==
Five varieties are accepted.

- Timonius timon var. buloloensis S.P.Darwin
- Timonius timon var. grandiflorus (K.Schum.) S.P.Darwin
- Timonius timon var. reticulatus S.P.Darwin
- Timonius timon var. timon
- Timonius timon var. whiteanus (S.Moore) S.P.Darwin
