= Stenostomum sintenisii =

Conservation status
- Vulnerable (IUCN 2.3)

Scientific classification
- Kingdom: Plantae
- Clade: Tracheophytes
- Clade: Angiosperms
- Clade: Eudicots
- Clade: Asterids
- Order: Gentianales
- Family: Rubiaceae
- Genus: Stenostomum
- Species: S. sintenisii

Binomial name
- Stenostomum sintenisii (Urb.) Britton & P.Wilson

Synonyms
- Antirhea sintenisii Urb.

Species of plant

Stenostomum sintenisii, synonym Antirhea sintenisii, is a species of plant in the family Rubiaceae. It is endemic to Puerto Rico.
