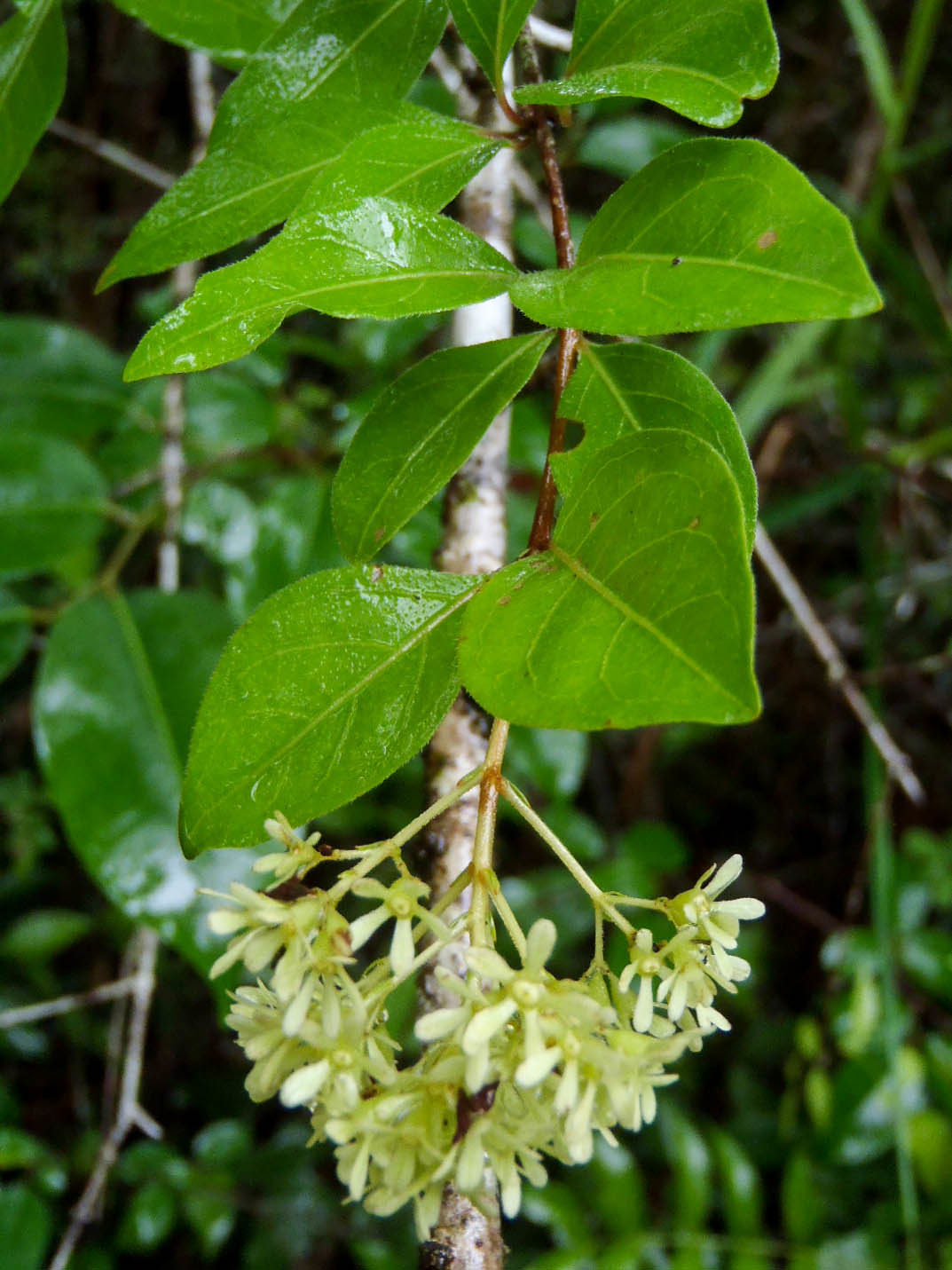

Scientific classification
- Kingdom: Plantae
- Clade: Tracheophytes
- Clade: Angiosperms
- Clade: Eudicots
- Clade: Asterids
- Order: Gentianales
- Family: Rubiaceae
- Subfamily: Cinchonoideae
- Tribe: Guettardeae
- Genus: Machaonia; Humboldt & Bonpland

Type species
- Machaonia acuminata Humboldt & Bonpland

= Machaonia =

Genus of flowering plants

Machaonia is a genus of flowering plants in the family Rubiaceae. It has about 32 species. All are indigenous to the neotropics. None has a unique common name. Some species have been called "alfilerillo", a Spanish name for the common and well-known genus Erodium. The type species for Machaonia is Machaonia acuminata.

Machaonia was named by Humboldt and Bonpland in 1806 in their book, Plantae Aequinoctiales. This genus name is for Machaon, the son of Asclepias in Greek Mythology.

Phylogenetic studies of DNA sequences have shown that Machaonia is paraphyletic over Neoblakea and Allenanthus.

== Species ==
The following species list may be incomplete or contain synonyms.

- Machaonia acuminata
- Machaonia erythrocarpa
- Machaonia portoricensis
- Machaonia woodburyana
