= Stenostomum jamaicense =

Conservation status
- Near Threatened (IUCN 2.3)

Scientific classification
- Kingdom: Plantae
- Clade: Tracheophytes
- Clade: Angiosperms
- Clade: Eudicots
- Clade: Asterids
- Order: Gentianales
- Family: Rubiaceae
- Genus: Stenostomum
- Species: S. jamaicense

Binomial name
- Stenostomum jamaicense (Urb.) Borhidi

Synonyms
- Antirhea jamaicensis Urb.; Stenostomum bifurcatum Griseb., sensu auct.

Species of plant

Stenostomum jamaicense, synonym Antirhea jamaicensis, is a species of plant in the family Rubiaceae. It is endemic to Jamaica.
