= Stenostomum radiatum =

Conservation status
- Endangered (IUCN 3.1)

Scientific classification
- Kingdom: Plantae
- Clade: Tracheophytes
- Clade: Angiosperms
- Clade: Eudicots
- Clade: Asterids
- Order: Gentianales
- Family: Rubiaceae
- Genus: Stenostomum
- Species: S. radiatum

Binomial name
- Stenostomum radiatum Griseb.

Synonyms
- Antirhea radiata (Griseb.) Urb.

Species of plant

Stenostomum radiatum, synonym Antirhea radiata, is a species of plant in the family Rubiaceae. It is native to Cuba, the Dominican Republic and Haiti. It is threatened by habitat loss.
