= Stenostomum tomentosum =

Conservation status
- Critically Endangered (IUCN 2.3)

Scientific classification
- Kingdom: Plantae
- Clade: Tracheophytes
- Clade: Angiosperms
- Clade: Eudicots
- Clade: Asterids
- Order: Gentianales
- Family: Rubiaceae
- Genus: Stenostomum
- Species: S. tomentosum

Binomial name
- Stenostomum tomentosum (Sw.) DC.

Synonyms
- Antirhea tomentosa (Sw.) Benth. & Hook.f. ex Fawc.; Guettarda tomentosa (Sw.) Pers.; Laugeria tomentosa Sw.

Species of plant

Stenostomum tomentosum, synonym Antirhea tomentosa, is a species of plant in the family Rubiaceae. It is endemic to Jamaica. It is threatened by habitat loss. The species was first discovered in 1780 and rediscovered in 1975, making it a Lazarus taxon.
