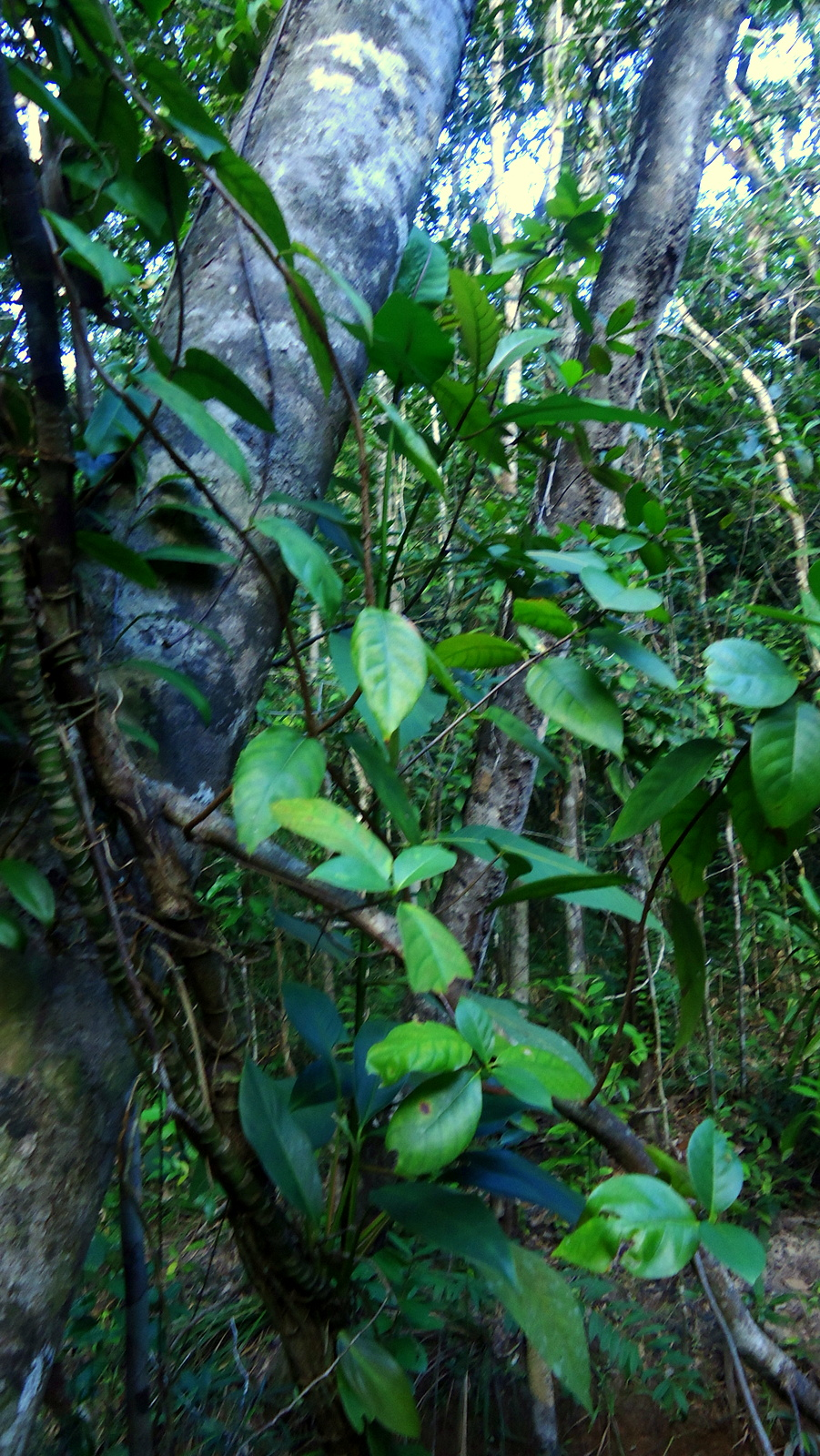
- Malanea rubiaceae

Scientific classification
- Kingdom: Plantae
- Clade: Tracheophytes
- Clade: Angiosperms
- Clade: Eudicots
- Clade: Asterids
- Order: Gentianales
- Family: Rubiaceae
- Genus: Malanea; Aubl.

= Malanea =

Genus of plants

Malanea is a genus of flowering plants belonging to the family Rubiaceae.

Its native range is Central and Southern Tropical America to Trinidad.

== Species ==
Species:

- Malanea auyantepuiensis Steyerm.
- Malanea boliviana Standl.
- Malanea campylocarpa C.M.Taylor
- Malanea centralis Sucre
- Malanea chimantensis Steyerm.
- Malanea chocoana Standl. ex Steyerm.
- Malanea ciliolata Steyerm.
- Malanea cruzii Steyerm.
- Malanea cylindrica C.M.Taylor
- Malanea duckei Standl.
- Malanea ecuadorensis C.M.Taylor
- Malanea egleri Steyerm.
- Malanea erecta Seem.
- Malanea evenosa Müll.Arg.
- Malanea fendleri Standl.
- Malanea forsteronioides Müll.Arg.
- Malanea gabrielensis Müll.Arg.
- Malanea glabra A.Rich.
- Malanea guaiquinimensis Steyerm.
- Malanea harleyi J.H.Kirkbr.
- Malanea hirsuta Standl.
- Malanea hypoleuca Steyerm.
- Malanea jauaensis Steyerm.
- Malanea martiana Müll.Arg.
- Malanea microphylla Standl. & Steyerm.
- Malanea obovata Hochr.
- Malanea panurensis Müll.Arg.
- Malanea pariensis Steyerm.
- Malanea ptariensis Steyerm.
- Malanea revolutifolia A.Amaya & Popovkin
- Malanea sanluisensis Steyerm.
- Malanea sarmentosa Aubl.
- Malanea schomburgkii Steyerm.
- Malanea setulosa Steyerm.
- Malanea sipapoensis Steyerm.
- Malanea spicata Müll.Arg.
- Malanea subtruncata Steyerm.
- Malanea tafelbergensis Steyerm.
- Malanea ueiensis Steyerm.
- Malanea ursina Standl.
