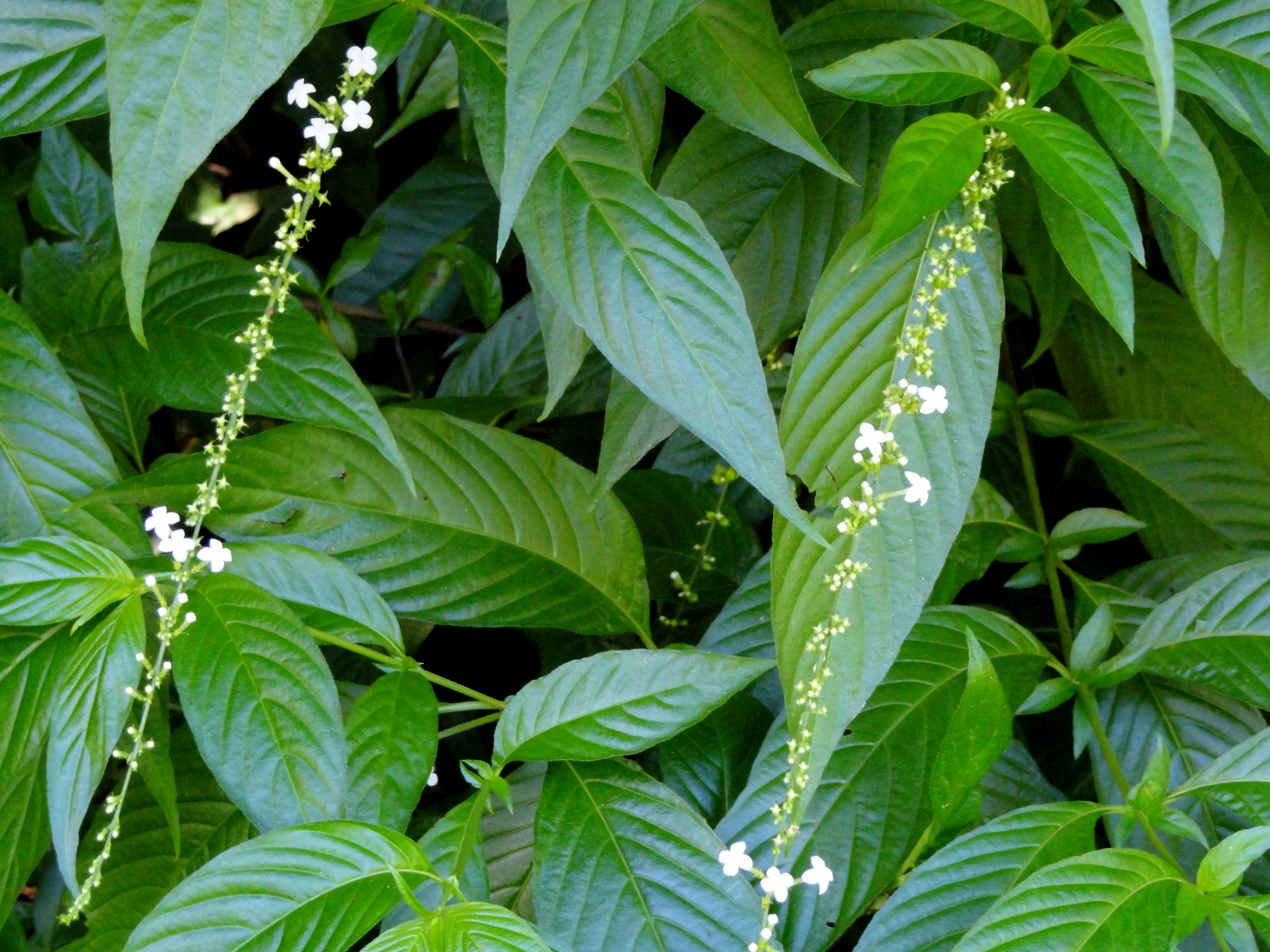
- Gonzalagunia hirsuta

Scientific classification
- Kingdom: Plantae
- Clade: Tracheophytes
- Clade: Angiosperms
- Clade: Eudicots
- Clade: Asterids
- Order: Gentianales
- Family: Rubiaceae
- Subfamily: Cinchonoideae
- Tribe: Guettardeae
- Genus: Gonzalagunia; Ruiz & Pav.

Species
- Several, see text

Synonyms
- Gonzalgunia (lapsus)

= Gonzalagunia =

Genus of plants

Gonzalagunia is a genus of plant in the family Rubiaceae.

Species include:

- Gonzalagunia affinis Standl. ex Steyerm.
- Gonzalagunia asperula (Wernham) Standl.
- Gonzalagunia bifida B.Ståhl
- Gonzalagunia brachyantha (A.Rich.) Urb.
- Gonzalagunia brenesii Standl.
- Gonzalagunia bunchosioides Standl.
- Gonzalagunia ciliata Steyerm.
- Gonzalagunia congesta J.H.Kirkbr.
- Gonzalagunia cornifolia (Kunth) Standl.
- Gonzalagunia cuatrecasasii Standl. ex Steyerm.
- Gonzalagunia dependens Ruiz & Pav.
- Gonzalagunia dicocca Cham. & Schltdl.
- Gonzalagunia discolor Standl.
- Gonzalagunia dodsonii Dwyer
- Gonzalagunia exigua B.Ståhl
- Gonzalagunia haitiensis Urb. & Ekman
- Gonzalagunia hirsuta (Jacq.) K.Schum.
- Gonzalagunia killipii Standl.
- Gonzalagunia longithyrsa Fosberg
- Gonzalagunia microsepala Urb. & Ekman
- Gonzalagunia mildredae D.R.Simpson ex C.M.Taylor
- Gonzalagunia mollis Spruce ex K.Schum.
- Gonzalagunia osaensis C.M.Taylor
- Gonzalagunia ovatifolia (Donn.Sm.) B.L.Rob.
- Gonzalagunia pachystachya Standl.
- Gonzalagunia panamensis (Cav.) K.Schum.
- Gonzalagunia pauciflora B.Ståhl
- Gonzalagunia rosea Standl.
- Gonzalagunia rudis (Standl.) Standl.
- Gonzalagunia sagrana Urb.
- Gonzalagunia sessilifolia Standl.
- Gonzalagunia sororia Standl.
- Gonzalagunia stenostachya (Standl.) W.C.Burger
- Gonzalagunia surinamensis Bremek.
- Gonzalagunia tacanensis Lundell
- Gonzalagunia thyrsoidea (Donn.Sm.) B.L.Rob.
- Gonzalagunia whitei (Rusby) Standl.
