= Stenostomum portoricense =

Conservation status
- Vulnerable (IUCN 2.3)

Scientific classification
- Kingdom: Plantae
- Clade: Embryophytes
- Clade: Tracheophytes
- Clade: Spermatophytes
- Clade: Angiosperms
- Clade: Eudicots
- Clade: Asterids
- Order: Gentianales
- Family: Rubiaceae
- Genus: Stenostomum
- Species: S. portoricense

Binomial name
- Stenostomum portoricense Britt. & Wilson

Synonyms
- Antirhea portoricensis (Britton & P.Wilson) Standl.

Species of plant

Stenostomum portoricense, synonym Antirhea portoricensis, is a species of plant in the family Rubiaceae. It is endemic to Puerto Rico.
