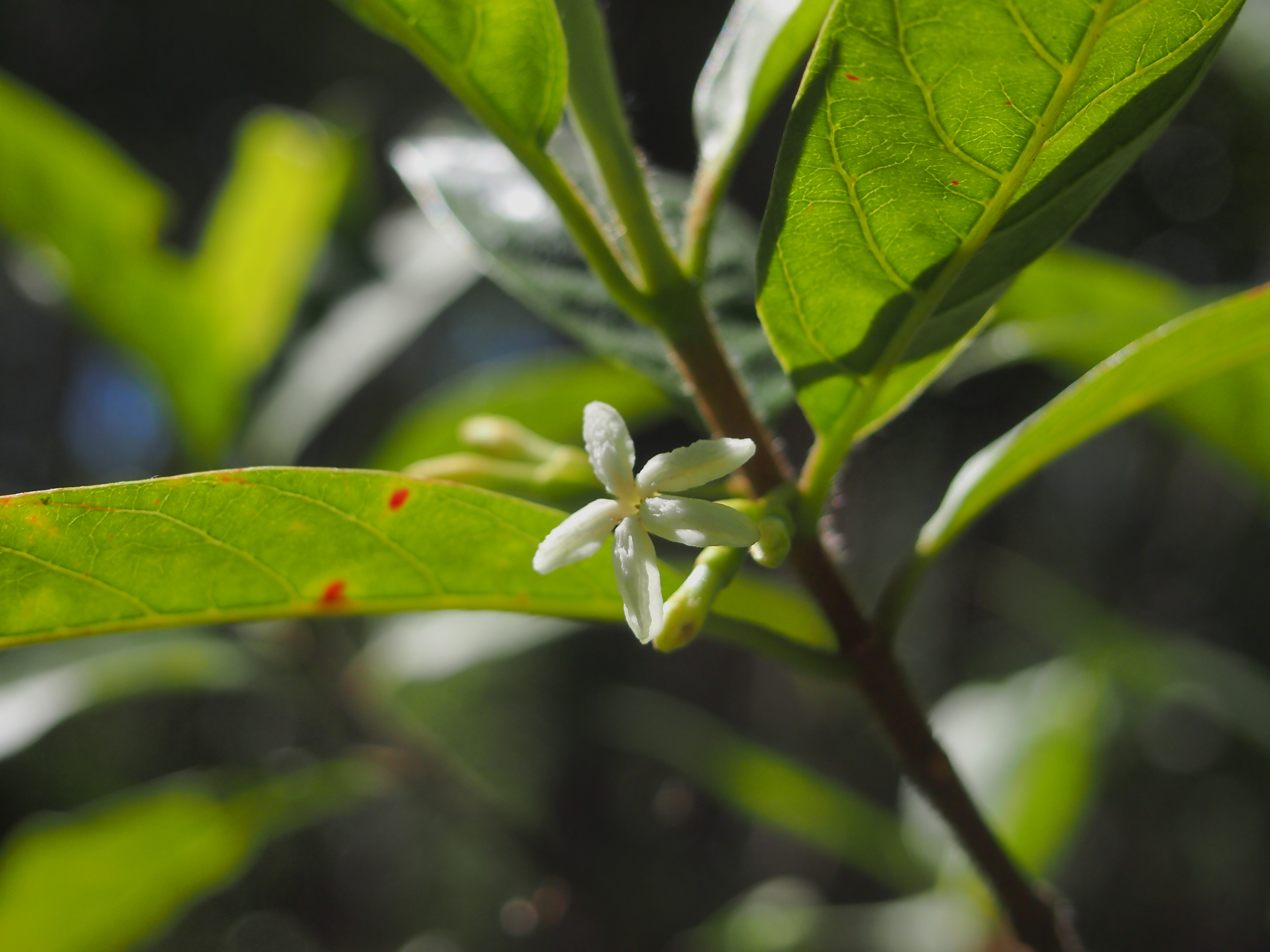
- Timonius timon

Scientific classification
- Kingdom: Plantae
- Clade: Tracheophytes
- Clade: Angiosperms
- Clade: Eudicots
- Clade: Asterids
- Order: Gentianales
- Family: Rubiaceae
- Subfamily: Cinchonoideae
- Tribe: Guettardeae
- Genus: Timonius; Rumph. ex DC.

Type species
- Timonius timon (Spreng.) Merr.

Synonyms
- Abbottia F.Muell.; Burneya Cham. & Schltdl.; Erithalis G.Forst.; Eupyrena Wight & Arn.; Helospora Jacq.; Polyphragmon Desf.; Porocarpus Gaertn.

= Timonius =

Genus of plants

Timonius is a genus of flowering plants in the family Rubiaceae. It includes 259 species, which range from the Seychelles and Sri Lanka to Indochina, Malesia, Papuasia, northern Australia, and the Pacific Islands. The genus' greatest centre of species diversity is New Guinea, with 86 native species. It is the second most speciose genus in the family Rubiaceae in Papua New Guinea, containing about 80 species known to science.

== Species ==
259 species are accepted. Selected species include:

- Timonius flavescens (Jack) Baker (synonym T. jambosella Thwaites)
- Timonius timon (Spreng.) Merr.
