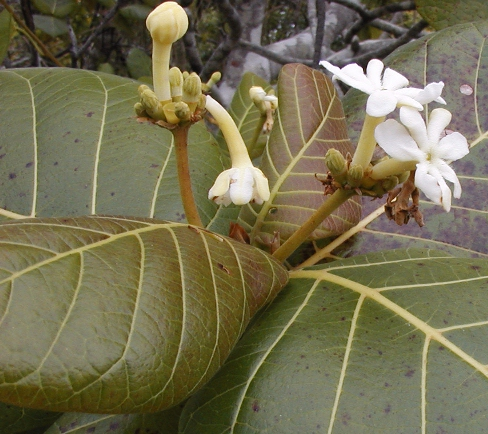
- Guettarda speciosa

Scientific classification
- Kingdom: Plantae
- Clade: Tracheophytes
- Clade: Angiosperms
- Clade: Eudicots
- Clade: Asterids
- Order: Gentianales
- Family: Rubiaceae
- Subfamily: Cinchonoideae
- Tribe: Guettardeae; DC.

Type genus
- Guettarda L.

= Guettardeae =

Tribe of flowering plants

Guettardeae is a tribe of flowering plants in the family Rubiaceae and contains about 748 species in 14 genera. Its representatives are widespread geographically and are found in the tropics and subtropics.

== Genera ==
Currently accepted names

- Antirhea Comm. ex A.Juss. (38 sp.)
- Arachnothryx Planch. (101 sp.)
- Bobea Gaudich. (4 sp.)
- Chomelia Jacq. (79 sp.)
- Gonzalagunia Ruiz & Pav. (40 sp.)
- Guettarda L. (157 sp.)
- Hodgkinsonia F.Muell. (2 sp.)
- Machaonia Humb. & Bonpl. (31 sp.)
- Malanea Aubl. (40 sp.)
- Neoblakea Standl. (2 sp.)
- Renistipula Borhidi (3 sp.)
- Rogiera Planch. (15 sp.)
- Stenostomum C.F.Gaertn. (49 sp.)
- Timonius Rumph. ex DC. (182 sp.)
- Tinadendron Achille (2 sp.)

Synonyms

- Abbottia F.Muell. = Timonius
- Allenanthus Standl. = Machaonia
- Anisomeris C.Presl = Chomelia
- Bellermannia Klotzsch ex H.Karst. = Gonzalagunia
- Bobaea A.Rich. = Bobea
- Buena Cav. = Gonzalagunia
- Bunophila Willd. ex Roem. & Schult. = Machaonia
- Burneya Cham. & Schltdl. = Timonius
- Cadamba Sonn. = Guettarda
- Caruelina Kuntze = Chomelia
- Caryococca Willd. ex Roem. & Schult. = Gonzalagunia
- Cuatrecasasiodendron Steyerm. = Arachnothryx
- Cunninghamia Schreb. = Malanea
- Dicrobotryum Willd. ex Schult. = Guettarda
- Donkelaaria Lem. = Guettarda
- Duggena Vahl ex Standl. = Gonzalagunia
- Edechia Loefl. = Guettarda
- Erithalis G.Forst. = Timonius
- Eupyrena Wight & Arn. = Timonius
- Gonzalea Pers. = Gonzalagunia
- Halesia P.Browne = Guettarda
- Helospora Jacq. = Timonius
- Javorkaea Borhidi & Jarai-Koml. = Arachnothryx
- Laugeria L. = Guettarda
- Laugeria Vahl ex Hook.f. = Stenostomum
- Laugieria Jacq. = Guettarda
- Matthiola L. = Guettarda
- Microsplenium Hook.f. = Machaonia
- Neolaugeria Nicolson = Stenostomum
- Obbea Hook.f. = Bobea
- Otocalyx Brandegee = Arachnothryx
- Polyphragmon Desf. = Timonius
- Porocarpus Gaertn. = Timonius
- Resinanthus (Borhidi) Borhidi = Stenostomum
- Rytidotus Hook.f. = Bobea
- Sardinia Vell. = Guettarda
- Schiedea A.Rich. = Machaonia
- Siphonandra Turcz. = Arachnothryx
- Sturmia C.F.Gaertn. = Stenostomum
- Terebraria Sessé ex Kuntze = Stenostomum
- Tertrea DC. = Machaonia
- Tournefortiopsis Rusby = Guettarda
- Viviania Raf. = Guettarda
