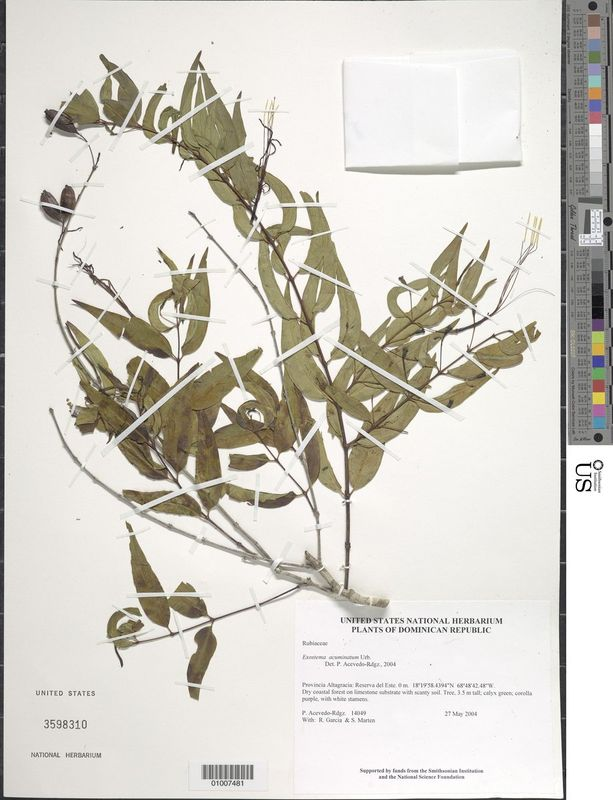

Conservation status
- Least Concern (IUCN 3.1)

Scientific classification
- Kingdom: Plantae
- Clade: Embryophytes
- Clade: Tracheophytes
- Clade: Spermatophytes
- Clade: Angiosperms
- Clade: Eudicots
- Clade: Asterids
- Order: Gentianales
- Family: Rubiaceae
- Genus: Exostema
- Species: E. acuminatum

Binomial name
- Exostema acuminatum Urb.

= Exostema acuminatum =

Species of flowering plant

Exostema acuminatum is a species of flowering plant in the family Rubiaceae. It is native to Hispaniola, and was described in 1903.

Exostema acuminatum is a shrub or tree with papery leaves, white flowers, and brownish-black capsule fruits. The wood is used for fuel, and the leaves are used to treat colds and flu-like symptoms. The IUCN lists the species as of Least Concern.

== Taxonomy ==
The species was described by Ignatz Urban in 1903. The type locality is near Gonaïves, Haiti.

Exostema acuminatum is a sister species of Exostema salicifolium. E. acuminatum may hybridise with Exostema caribaeum.

== Distribution ==
Exostema acuminatum is native to the wet tropical biome of Hispaniola (the Dominican Republic and Haiti). It mostly grows on the northern and southern coasts of Hispaniola. The species' estimated extent of occurrence is 53,272 square kilometres (20,568 sq mi).

Exostema acuminatum grows in lowland, subtropical, and dry forests, reaching altitudes of up to 600 metres (2,000 ft). It can grow on limestone, and alluvial soil. The species grows in both disturbed and natural habitats.

== Description ==
Exostema acuminatum is a shrub or tree. It grows up to 7 metres (23 ft) high. The branches are yellowish or grey.

The leaf stems are 2–3 millimetres (0.079–0.118 in) long. The leaves are papery, lanceolate to ovate-lanceolate, 4–6 centimetres (1.6–2.4 in) long, and 1–2.2 centimetres (0.39–0.87 in) wide. The primary vein is prominent on the upper surface.

The flower stems are 1–1.5 centimetres (0.39–0.59 in) long, and usually have a single flower. The hypanthium is 5 millimetres (0.20 in) long, and is oblong or elliptical-oblong. The calyx has five minute triangular lobes. The corolla is white, and 6–7 centimetres (2.4–2.8 in) long. The corolla tube is 2–2.5 centimetres (0.79–0.98 in) long, and around 1.5 millimetres (0.059 in) thick.

The fruits are brownish-black, elliptical-oblong capsules. The capsules are around 1.8 centimetres (0.71 in) long, and 6 millimetres (0.24 in) thick.

== Uses ==
Exostema acuminatum is used for charcoal and firewood. The leaves can be used to create a herbal-like tea, which is used to treat colds and flu-like symptoms.

== Conservation ==
In 2024, the IUCN assessed Exostema acuminatum as of Least Concern. The population is considered stable.

The species is present in protected areas of the Dominican Republic. It can compete with invasive species, including Neltuma juliflora. Exostema acuminatum may be threatened by the use of wood for fuel, and habitat loss caused by development and agriculture.

== Names ==
In Spanish, the species is known as Quina or Piñi-piñi.
