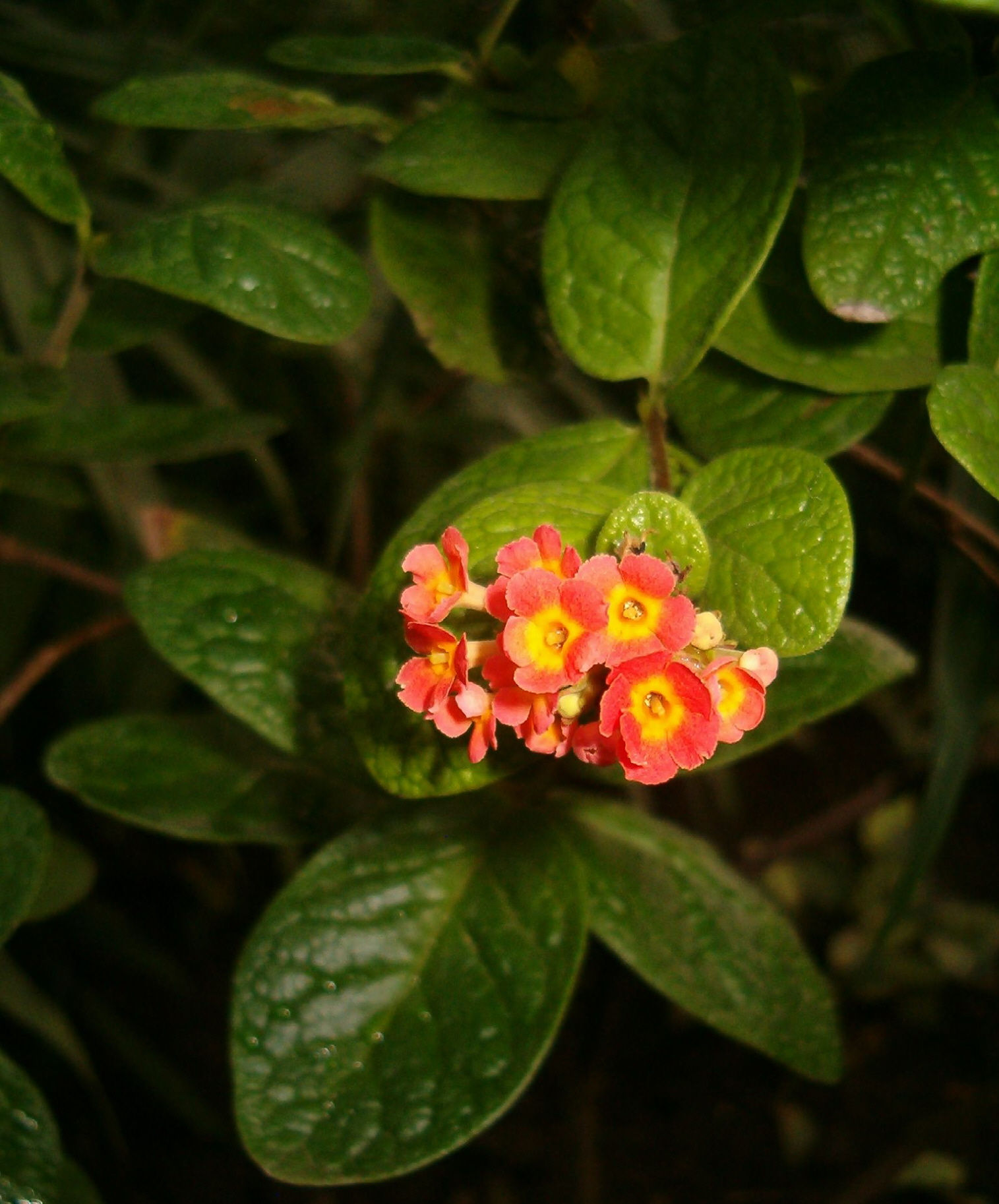
- Rondeletia odorata

Scientific classification
- Kingdom: Plantae
- Clade: Tracheophytes
- Clade: Angiosperms
- Clade: Eudicots
- Clade: Asterids
- Order: Gentianales
- Family: Rubiaceae
- Subfamily: Cinchonoideae
- Tribe: Rondeletieae; DC. ex Miq.

Type genus
- Rondeletia L.

= Rondeletieae =

Tribe of plants

Rondeletieae is a tribe of flowering plants in the family Rubiaceae and contains about 170 species in 13 genera. Its representatives are found from southern Mexico to northern South America and in the Caribbean.

== Genera ==
Currently accepted names

- Acrosynanthus Urb. (7 sp.)
- Acunaeanthus Borhidi, Komlódi & Moncada (1 sp.)
- Blepharidium Standl. (1 sp.)
- Donnellyanthus Borhidi (1 sp.)
- Jamaicanthus Borhidi (1 sp.)
- Mazaea Krug & Urb. (2 sp.)
- Phyllomelia Griseb. (1 sp.)
- Rachicallis DC. (1 sp.)
- Roigella Borhidi & M.Fernandez Zeq. (1 sp.)
- Rondeletia L. (154 sp.)
- Rovaeanthus Borhidi (2 sp.)
- Suberanthus Borhidi & M.Fernandez Zeq. (7 sp.)
- Tainus Torr.-Montúfar, H.Ochot. & Borsch (1 sp.)

Synonyms

- Arachnimorpha Desv. ex Ham. = Rondeletia
- Ariadne Urb. = Mazaea
- Lightfootia Schreb. = Rondeletia
- Neomazaea Urb. = Mazaea
- Petesia P.Browne = Rondeletia
- Zamaria Raf. = Rondeletia
