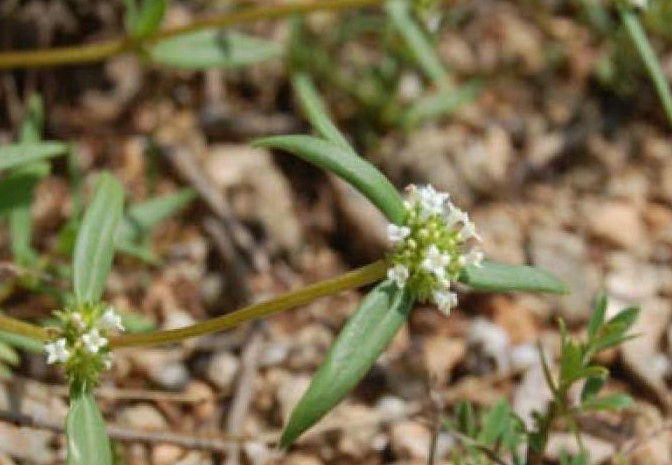

Conservation status
- Endangered (ESA)

Scientific classification
- Kingdom: Plantae
- Clade: Tracheophytes
- Clade: Angiosperms
- Clade: Eudicots
- Clade: Asterids
- Order: Gentianales
- Family: Rubiaceae
- Genus: Mitracarpus
- Species: M. polycladus

Binomial name
- Mitracarpus polycladus Urb.

= Mitracarpus polycladus =

Species of plant

Mitracarpus polycladus is a rare species of flowering plant in the coffee family known by the common name cana gorda girdlepod. It is native to Puerto Rico, where it is known only to come from the Guánica Commonwealth Forest. It can also be found on the island of Saba. It grows in coastal scrub forest and dwarf forest with limestone gravel substrates. Other plants in the habitat include Bucida buceras, Bursera simaruba, Exostema caribaeum, Coccoloba microstachya, Plumeria alba, and Pilosocereus armatus (syn. P. royenii var. amatus).

It is a perennial herb with many erect or spreading branches growing up to 45 centimeters tall. The linear or lance-shaped leaves are up to 4.5 centimeters long. The inflorescence is a rounded head of tiny white flowers.

It is a federally listed endangered species of the United States, threatened by road construction and maintenance. Its small population size makes it vulnerable to extinction.
