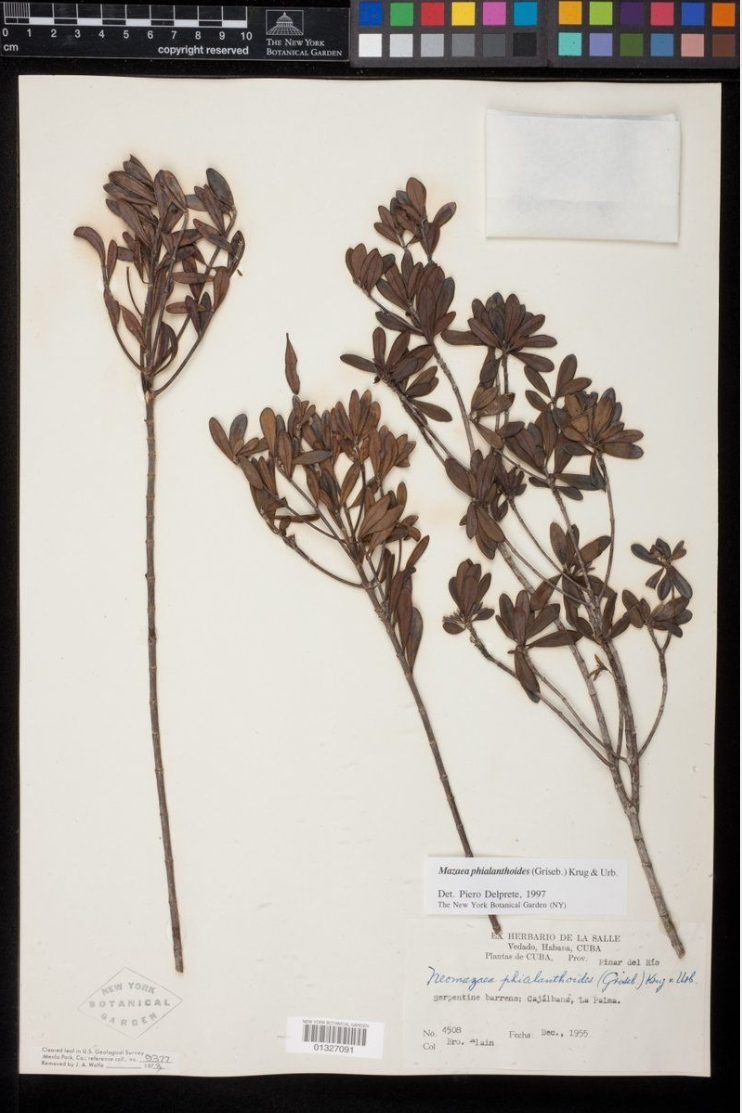

Scientific classification
- Kingdom: Plantae
- Clade: Embryophytes
- Clade: Tracheophytes
- Clade: Spermatophytes
- Clade: Angiosperms
- Clade: Eudicots
- Clade: Asterids
- Order: Gentianales
- Family: Rubiaceae
- Genus: Mazaea
- Species: M. phialanthoides

Binomial name
- Mazaea phialanthoides (Griseb.) Krug & Urb.

Synonyms
- Neomazaea phialanthoides (Griseb.) Krug & Urb.; Rondeletia phialanthoides Griseb.

= Mazaea phialanthoides =

Species of flowering plant

Mazaea phialanthoides is a species of flowering plant in the family Rubiaceae. It is a shrub with white flowers, that produces capsule fruits. The species is endemic to Cuba, and was described in 1866.

== Taxonomy ==
The species was first described by August Grisebach in 1866, as Rondeletia phialanthoides. In 1897, Karl Wilhelm Leopold Krug and Ignatz Urban moved the species from Rondeletia to Mazaea.

== Distribution ==
Mazaea phialanthoides is native to the wet tropical biome of western Cuba. It grows in serpentine barrens, at elevations of 400–500 metres (1,300–1,600 ft).

== Description ==
Mazaea phialanthoides is a multi-stemmed shrub that grows 1–3 metres (3.3–9.8 ft) high. The bark is smooth and light grey. The wood is white. The young branches are 1–2 millimetres (0.039–0.079 in) thick.

The leaves are 9–28 millimetres (0.35–1.10 in) long, and 3–7 millimetres (0.12–0.28 in) wide. The leaves are narrowly oblong or obovate, dark green on the upper side, and pale green underneath. The leaf stems are 1–4 millimetres (0.039–0.157 in) long.

The inflorescences have one or two flowers, which have 1–2 millimetres (0.039–0.079 in) long stems. The calyx has four lobes. The larger lobes are 1.5–4 millimetres (0.059–0.157 in) long, and the smaller lobes are 0.5–1 millimetre (0.020–0.039 in) long. The corolla is a white funnel, that is 4.5–6 millimetres (0.18–0.24 in) long. The male flowers have four or five stamens.

The fruits are greyish or dark brown, narrowly oblong capsules, with multiple ribs. The capsules are 6–8 millimetres (0.24–0.31 in) long, and 1.5–2 millimetres (0.059–0.079 in) wide. The capsule is divided into locules, each of which has two to seven seeds. The seeds are shield-like, 2.5–3.5 millimetres (0.098–0.138 in) long, 0.3–0.5 millimetres (0.012–0.020 in) wide, and have three ribs.
