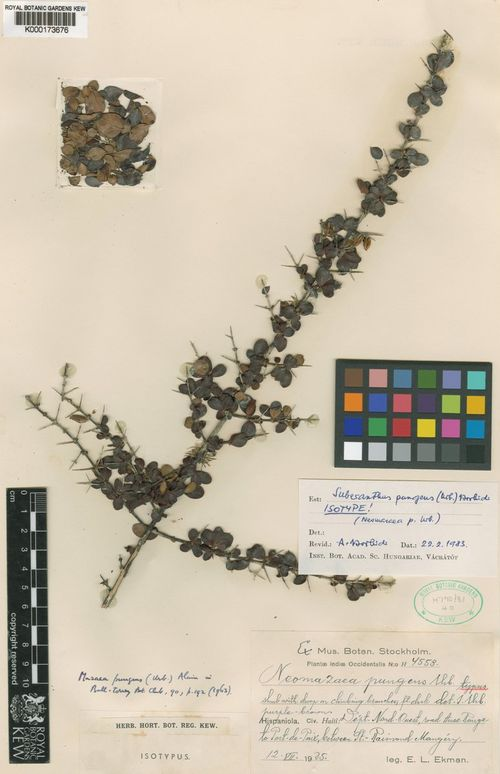

Conservation status
- Critically Endangered (IUCN 3.1)

Scientific classification
- Kingdom: Plantae
- Clade: Tracheophytes
- Clade: Angiosperms
- Clade: Eudicots
- Clade: Asterids
- Order: Gentianales
- Family: Rubiaceae
- Genus: Suberanthus
- Species: S. pungens

Binomial name
- Suberanthus pungens (Urb.) Borhidi

Synonyms
- Mazaea pungens (Urb.) Alain; Neomazaea pungens Urb.

= Suberanthus pungens =

Species of flowering plant

Suberanthus pungens is a species of small shrub in the family Rubiaceae. The species was described in 1927, and reclassified in 1983. It is native to north-west Haiti, and classified as Critically Endangered.

== Distribution ==
Suberanthus pungens is endemic to the seasonally dry tropical biome of north-west Haiti. It is known only from the type locality, and is found at elevations from 20–150 metres (66–492 ft).

== Taxonomy ==
Suberanthus pungens was initially described as Neomazaea pungens in 1927, by Ignatz Urban. It was transferred to its current genus in 1983, by Attila Borhidi and Mayra Fernández.

== Conservation ==
In 2020, the IUCN assessed Suberanthus pungens as critically endangered. It is threatened by deforestation, and does not occur in any protected areas.
