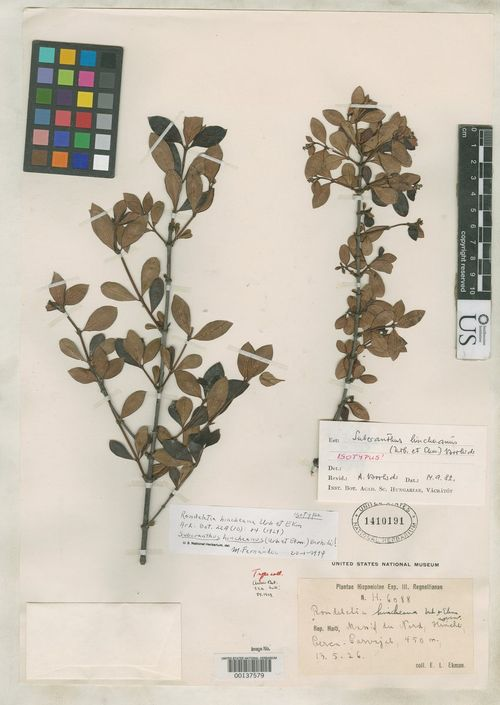

Conservation status
- Endangered (IUCN 3.1)

Scientific classification
- Kingdom: Plantae
- Clade: Tracheophytes
- Clade: Angiosperms
- Clade: Eudicots
- Clade: Asterids
- Order: Gentianales
- Family: Rubiaceae
- Genus: Suberanthus
- Species: S. hincheanus

Binomial name
- Suberanthus hincheanus (Urb. & Ekman) Borhidi

Synonyms
- Rondeletia hincheana Urb. & Ekman

= Suberanthus hincheanus =

Species of flowering plant

Suberanthus hincheanus is a species of flowering plant in the family Rubiaceae. The species is a large shrub or small tree, and grows up to 4 metres (13 ft) high. It was described in 1983.

== Distribution ==
Suberanthus hincheanus is native to the wet tropical biome of north-central Hispaniola (the Dominican Republic and Haiti). The species is known from five locations. Its extent of occupancy is around 1,573 square kilometres (607 sq mi).

The species occurs at elevations of 300–600 metres (980–1,970 ft).

== Conservation ==
In 2023, the IUCN listed Suberanthus hincheana as Endangered. The population is thought to be small, and in decline.

Suberanthus hincheana is threatened by deforestation, which may be for agriculture, development, grazing, and charcoal manufacture. In Haiti, the species is threatened by the invasive grass Themeda quadrivalvis.

== Uses ==
The inflorescences of Suberanthus hincheanus may be used ornamentally. The wood may be used as firewood, or for charcoal.
