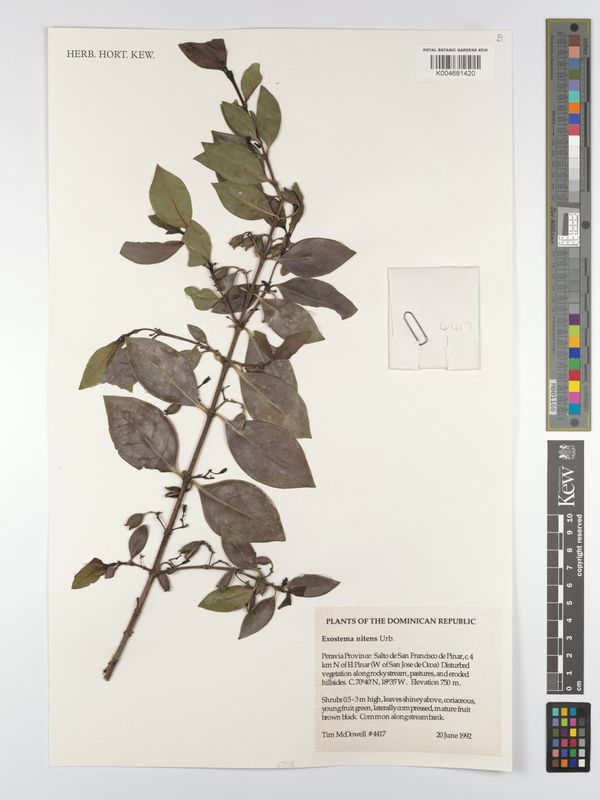

Conservation status
- Least Concern (IUCN 3.1)

Scientific classification
- Kingdom: Plantae
- Clade: Embryophytes
- Clade: Tracheophytes
- Clade: Spermatophytes
- Clade: Angiosperms
- Clade: Eudicots
- Clade: Asterids
- Order: Gentianales
- Family: Rubiaceae
- Genus: Exostema
- Species: E. nitens

Binomial name
- Exostema nitens Urb.

= Exostema nitens =

Species of flowering plant

Exostema nitens is a species of flowering plant in the family Rubiaceae. It is a shrub or tree native to Hispaniola. The species was described in 1921, and is listed as Least Concern by the IUCN.

== Taxonomy ==
The species was described by Ignatz Urban in 1921.

== Distribution ==
Exostema nitens is native to the wet tropical biome of Hispaniola (the Dominican Republic and Haiti). The IUCN describes the species as endemic to the Dominican Republic. Its extent of occurrence is around 1,063 square kilometres (410 sq mi).

Exostema nitens is present at elevations of 250–1,500 metres (820–4,920 ft). It is grows in subtropical forests, and is common near streams and ravines in the mountains of the Cordillera Central.

== Description ==
Exostema nitens is a shrub or tree that grows up to 6 metres (20 ft) high.

== Uses ==
The wood of Exostema nitens is hard, and is used for firewood and charcoal.

== Conservation ==
In 2024, the IUCN assessed Exostema nitens as of Least Concern. It is abundant, and occurs in protected areas.

== Nomenclature ==
In Spanish, the species is known as Cafetillo.
