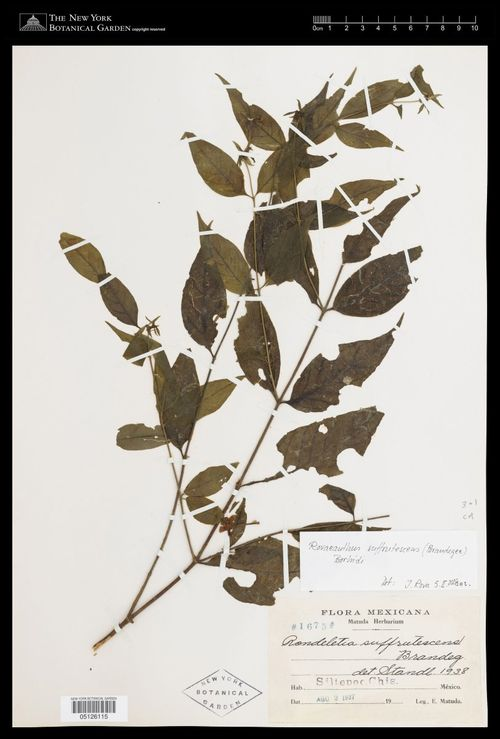

Scientific classification
- Kingdom: Plantae
- Clade: Embryophytes
- Clade: Tracheophytes
- Clade: Angiosperms
- Clade: Eudicots
- Clade: Asterids
- Order: Gentianales
- Family: Rubiaceae
- Genus: Rovaeanthus
- Species: R. suffrutescens

Binomial name
- Rovaeanthus suffrutescens (Brandegee) Borhidi

Synonyms
- Rogiera suffrutescens (Brandegee) Borhidi; Rondeletia suffrutescens Brandegee

= Rovaeanthus suffrutescens =

Species of flowering plant

Rovaeanthus suffrutescens is a species of flowering plant in the family Rubiaceae. It is a shrub native to Mexico and Guatemala, that grows 1–2 metres (3.3–6.6 ft) high.

Rovaeanthus suffrutescens was first described in 1914 as Rondeletia suffrutescens. It was moved to the genus Rovaeanthus in 2004.

== Taxonomy ==
Rovaeanthus suffrutescens was first described by Townshend Stith Brandegee in 1914, as Rondeletia suffrutescens. In 1982, Attila Borhidi moved the species from Rondeletia to Rogeria.

In 2004, Borhidi moved the species to the newly created genus Rovaeanthus, which includes one other species (Rovaeanthus strigosus). R. suffrutescens is the type species of the genus.

== Distribution ==
Rovaeanthus suffrutescens is native to the wet tropical biome of Mexico (Chiapas) and south-west Guatemala.

== Description ==
Rovaeanthus suffrutescens is a scrambling shrub or subshrub. It is 1–2 metres (3.3–6.6 ft) tall. The plant has papery leaves, which are 3–5 centimetres (1.2–2.0 in) long. The corolla tube has fine, stiff hairs.
