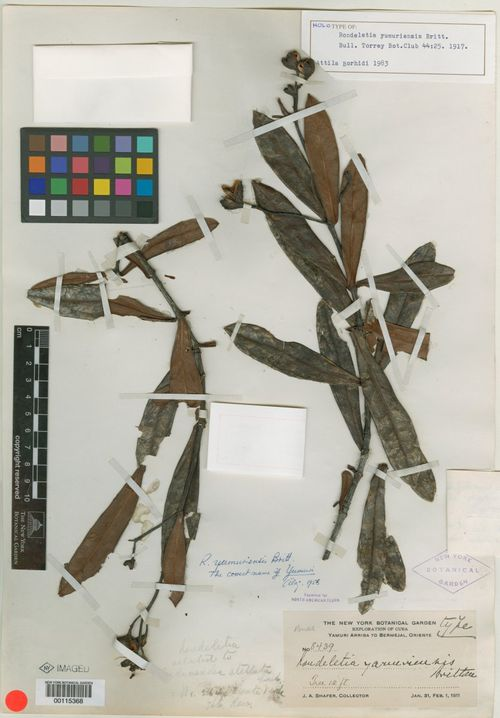

Scientific classification
- Kingdom: Plantae
- Clade: Tracheophytes
- Clade: Angiosperms
- Clade: Eudicots
- Clade: Asterids
- Order: Gentianales
- Family: Rubiaceae
- Genus: Suberanthus
- Species: S. yumuriensis

Binomial name
- Suberanthus yumuriensis (Britton) Borhidi & M.Fernández

Synonyms
- Rondeletia stellata subsp. yumuriensis (Britton) Borhidi; Rondeletia yumuriensis Britton

= Suberanthus yumuriensis =

Species of flowering plant

Suberanthus yumuriensis is a species of flowering plant in the family Rubiaceae. It is a tree around 4 metres (13 ft), which produces dry fruits. The species was described in 1917, and renamed in 1975 and 1982.

Suberanthus yumuriensis is native to the seasonally dry tropical biome of eastern Cuba.

== Taxonomy ==
Nathaniel Lord Britton published a description of the species as Rondeletia yumuriensis in 1917. Attila Borhidi described it as a subspecies of Rondeletia stellata (Rondeletia stellata subsp. yumuriensis) in 1975. The species was given its current name in 1982.

== Description ==
Suberanthus yumuriensis is a tree about 4 metres (13 ft) high. The branches are stout, and dark brown or greyish. The plants are hairless.

The leaves are thick, leathery, and dark green. They are long and narrow, or oblong in shape. The leaves are 5–9.5 centimetres (2.0–3.7 in) long, and 1–2 centimetres (0.39–0.79 in) wide. The leaves have a broad midrib, and are attached without stems.

Suberanthus yumuriensis has inflorescences with few flowers. The flower stems arise at different points, but reach about the same height. The inflorescences grow on 4–6 centimetres (1.6–2.4 in) stalks.

Suberanthus yumuriensis has dark-brown, dry fruits, which measure 1–1.4 centimetres (0.39–0.55 in) long, and are spherical or pear-shaped. The seeds are brown, 3–4 millimetres (0.12–0.16 in) long, and have narrow wings.
