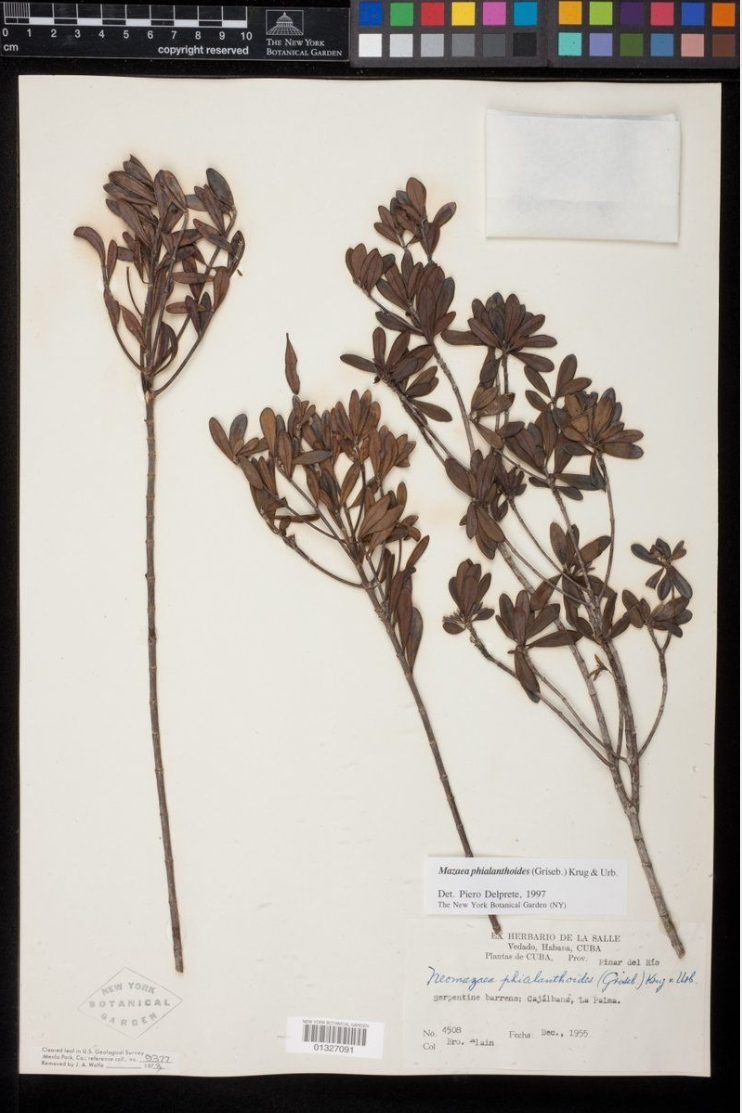
- Mazaea phialanthoides

Scientific classification
- Kingdom: Plantae
- Clade: Embryophytes
- Clade: Tracheophytes
- Clade: Spermatophytes
- Clade: Angiosperms
- Clade: Eudicots
- Clade: Asterids
- Order: Gentianales
- Family: Rubiaceae
- Subfamily: Cinchonoideae
- Tribe: Rondeletieae
- Genus: Mazaea; Krug & Urb.

Type species
- Mazaea phialanthoides (Griseb.) Krug & Urb.

Synonyms
- Ariadne Urb.; Neomazaea Urb.

= Mazaea =

Genus of plants

Mazaea is a genus of flowering plants in the family Rubiaceae. There are two species, both of which are endemic to Cuba. Mazaea are shrubs or trees with leather leaves and capsule fruits.

The genus was established in 1897, and was known as Neomazaea until at least 1992. The genus was named in honour of Manuel Gómez de la Maza y Jiménez.

== Taxonomy ==
Mazaea was established by Karl Wilhelm Leopold Krug and Ignatz Urban in 1897. It was renamed to Neomazaea in 1987, because the name Mazaea was in use for a genus of algae. The name of the algae genus was later determined to be invalid, and the plant genus is correctly known as Mazaea, though Neomazaea was in use until at least 1922. In 1922, Ignatz Urban published the genus name Ariadne. In 1999, Piero G. Delprete synonymised Ariadne with Mazaea.

== Species ==
- Mazaea phialanthoides (Griseb.) Krug & Urb.
- Mazaea shaferi (Standl.) Delprete

== Description ==
Mazaea are multi-stemmed shrubs or small trees with cylindrical branches. The wood is cream-white, and the bark is smooth and greyish-brown.

The leaves are leathery, arranged oppositely, and have short stems. The leaves of M. phialanthoides are wider than those of M. shaferi.

The flowers are solitary in M. phialanthoides, and in racemes or panicles in M. shaferi. The calyx is a tube with four lobes. The corolla is trumpet-shaped. The corolla has four stamens.

The fruits are oblong or elliptical capsules. The capsules are dehiscent.

== Etymology ==
The genus is named after Manuel Gómez de la Maza y Jiménez, director of the Havana botanical garden.
