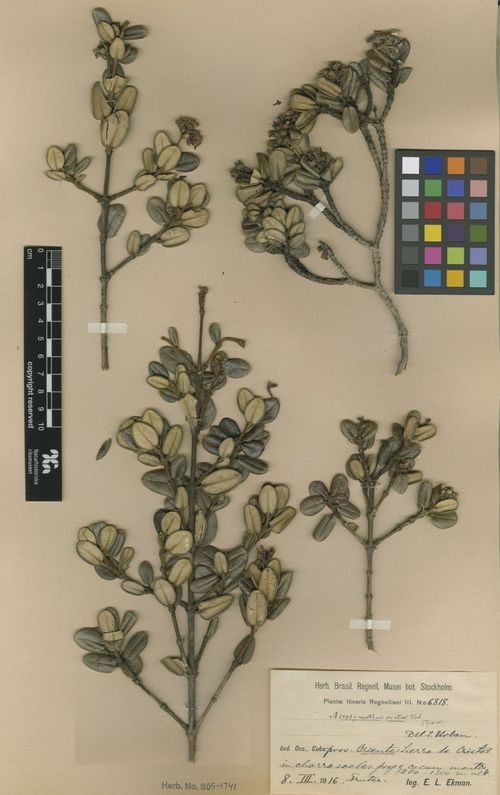

Scientific classification
- Kingdom: Plantae
- Clade: Embryophytes
- Clade: Tracheophytes
- Clade: Spermatophytes
- Clade: Angiosperms
- Clade: Eudicots
- Clade: Asterids
- Order: Gentianales
- Family: Rubiaceae
- Genus: Acrosynanthus
- Species: A. ovatus

Binomial name
- Acrosynanthus ovatus Urb.

= Acrosynanthus ovatus =

Species of flowering plant

Acrosynanthus ovatus is a species of flowering plant in the family Rubiaceae. It is a shrub native to eastern Cuba.

The species was named by Ignatz Urban in 1923.

== Distribution ==
Acrosynanthus ovatus is native to the wet tropical biome of eastern Cuba.

== Description ==
Acrosynanthus ovatus is a shrub.

The leaves are 1–2.5 centimetres (0.39–0.98 in) long, 0.8–1.8 centimetres (0.31–0.71 in) wide, and grow on 3–4 millimetres (0.12–0.16 in) stems. The inflorescences have five to seven flowers. The corolla is around 1 centimetre (0.39 in) long.
