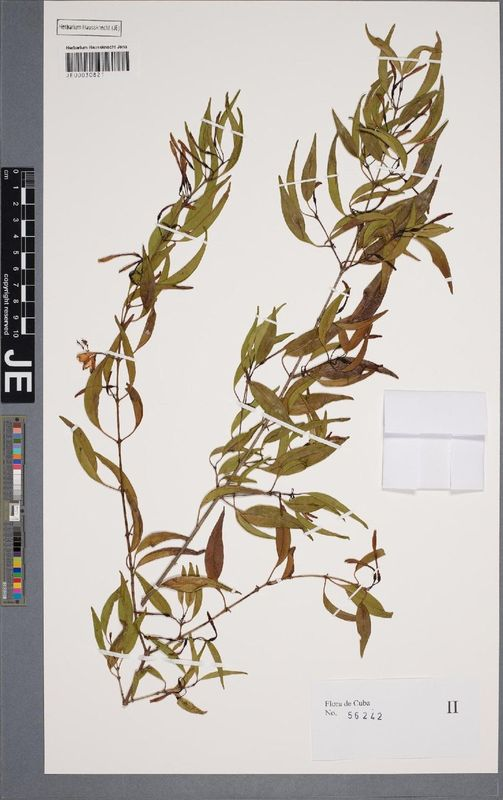

Conservation status
- Endangered (IUCN 3.1)

Scientific classification
- Kingdom: Plantae
- Clade: Embryophytes
- Clade: Tracheophytes
- Clade: Spermatophytes
- Clade: Angiosperms
- Clade: Eudicots
- Clade: Asterids
- Order: Gentianales
- Family: Rubiaceae
- Genus: Exostema
- Species: E. lancifolium

Binomial name
- Exostema lancifolium Borhidi & Acuña

Varieties
- Exostema lancifolium var. lancifolium; Exostema lancifolium var. lucidum (Borhidi & M.Fernández) Borhidi

= Exostema lancifolium =

Species of flowering plant

Exostema lancifolium is a species of flowering plant in the family Rubiaceae. It is a shrub or tree native to Cuba. The species was described in 1972, and is listed as Endangered by the IUCN.

== Taxonomy ==
The species was described by Attila Borhidi and Julián Acuña Galé in 1972.

Two varieties are accepted:

- Exostema lancifolium var. lancifolium - Native to Eastern Cuba
- Exostema lancifolium var. lucidum (Borhidi & M.Fernández) Borhidi - Native to Sierra de Moa

== Distribution ==
Exostema lancifolium is native to the wet tropical biome of Eastern Cuba. It grows in forests and shrublands, at elevations of 100–450 metres (330–1,480 ft).

== Description ==
Exostema lancifolium is a shrub or tree.

== Conservation ==
In 2023, the IUCN assessed Exostema lancifolium as Endangered. There are around 199 mature individuals.
