= Cyperus constanzae =

Scientific classification
- Kingdom: Plantae
- Clade: Tracheophytes
- Clade: Angiosperms
- Clade: Monocots
- Clade: Commelinids
- Order: Poales
- Family: Cyperaceae
- Genus: Cyperus
- Species: C. constanzae

Binomial name
- Cyperus constanzae Urb.

Species of sedge

Cyperus constanzae is a species of sedge that is native to Cuba, Hispaniola (the Dominican Republic and Haiti), and Jamaica in the Caribbean.

== See also ==
- List of Cyperus species
