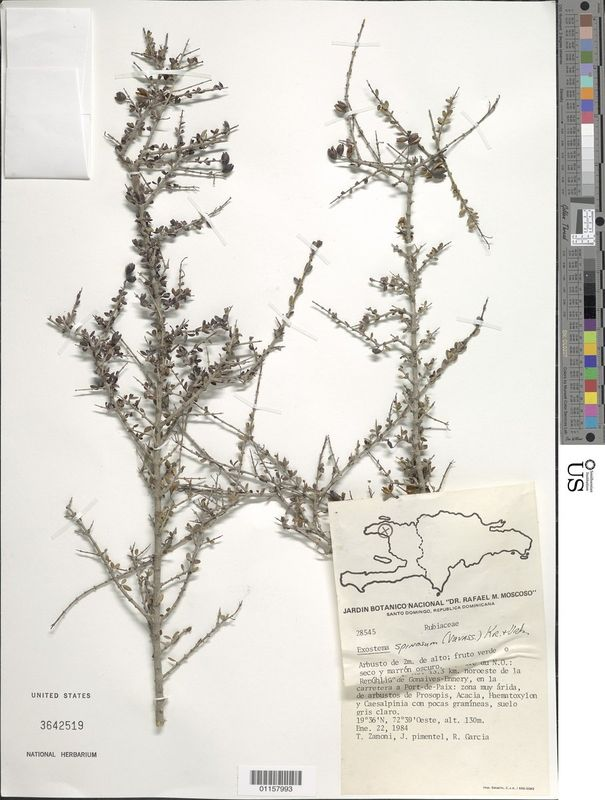

Scientific classification
- Kingdom: Plantae
- Clade: Embryophytes
- Clade: Tracheophytes
- Clade: Angiosperms
- Clade: Eudicots
- Clade: Asterids
- Order: Gentianales
- Family: Rubiaceae
- Genus: Exostema
- Species: E. spinosum

Binomial name
- Exostema spinosum (Le Vavass.) Krug & Urb.

Subspecies
- Exostema spinosum subsp. spinosum; Exostema spinosum subsp. tortuense (Urb.) Borhidi

Synonyms
- Catesbaea vavassorii Spreng.; Cinchona spinosa Le Vavass.

= Exostema spinosum =

Species of flowering plant

Exostema spinosum is a species of flowering plant in the family Rubiaceae. It is a shrub or tree with spiny branchlets, thickly leathery leaves, solitary flowers, and capsule fruits. The species is native to the Caribbean, and was described in 1790.

== Taxonomy ==
Exostema spinosum was described by Léon Le Vavasseur in 1790, and placed in the genus Cinchona. In 1897, Karl Wilhelm Leopold Krug and Ignatz Urban moved it to the genus Exostema.

== Distribution ==
Exostema spinosum is native to the wet tropical biome of Cuba, the Dominican Republic, and Haiti.

== Description ==
Exostema spinosum is a shrub or tree that grows 1–2 metres (3.3–6.6 ft) high. The branches are stout and greyish. The branchlets are slender and spiny.

The leaf stems are up to 1 millimetre (0.039 in) long. The leaves are thickly leathery, oval or oblong in shape, 3–8 millimetres (0.12–0.31 in) long, and 1.5–4 millimetres (0.059–0.157 in) wide.

The flowers are solitary, and grow on 5–7 millimetres (0.20–0.28 in) stems. The hypanthium is oblong, and 3–4 millimetres (0.12–0.16 in) long. The calyx has four lobes, which are up to 0.5 millimetres (0.020 in) long. The corolla is 1.5–2 centimetres (0.59–0.79 in) long, and has four lobes, which are 6–9 millimetres (0.24–0.35 in) long. The flowers have four stamens.

The fruit is a smooth, dark brown, oval-oblong capsule, measuring 8–12 millimetres (0.31–0.47 in) long.

== Nomenclature ==
In French, the species is known as alphonsine. In Spanish, it is known as espinillo.
