= Ciceronia =

Scientific classification
- Kingdom: Plantae
- Clade: Tracheophytes
- Clade: Angiosperms
- Clade: Eudicots
- Clade: Asterids
- Order: Asterales
- Family: Asteraceae
- Subfamily: Asteroideae
- Tribe: Eupatorieae
- Genus: Ciceronia; Urb.
- Species: C. chaptalioides

Binomial name
- Ciceronia chaptalioides Urb.

Genus of flowering plants

Ciceronia is a genus of flowering plants in the family Asteraceae.

There is only one known species, Ciceronia chaptalioides, endemic to Cuba.

It was named after Cicero.
