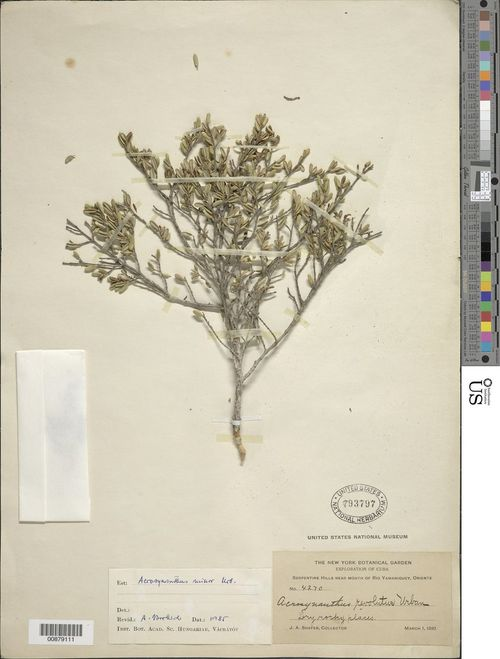

Scientific classification
- Kingdom: Plantae
- Clade: Embryophytes
- Clade: Tracheophytes
- Clade: Spermatophytes
- Clade: Angiosperms
- Clade: Eudicots
- Clade: Asterids
- Order: Gentianales
- Family: Rubiaceae
- Genus: Acrosynanthus
- Species: A. minor

Binomial name
- Acrosynanthus minor Urb.

= Acrosynanthus minor =

Species of flowering plant

Acrosynanthus minor is a species of flowering plant in the family Rubiaceae. It is a shrub native to Cuba.

The species was named by Ignatz Urban in 1923.

== Distribution ==
Acrosynanthus minor is native to the seasonally dry tropical biome of Eastern Cuba.

== Description ==
Acrosynanthus minor is a branching shrub. The leaves are broadly linear to oblong-linear in shape, 5–8 millimetres (0.20–0.31 in) long, and 1–1.7 millimetres (0.039–0.067 in) wide. The seed-case is obovate, 2.5 millimetres (0.098 in) long, and 1.8 millimetres (0.071 in) deep.
