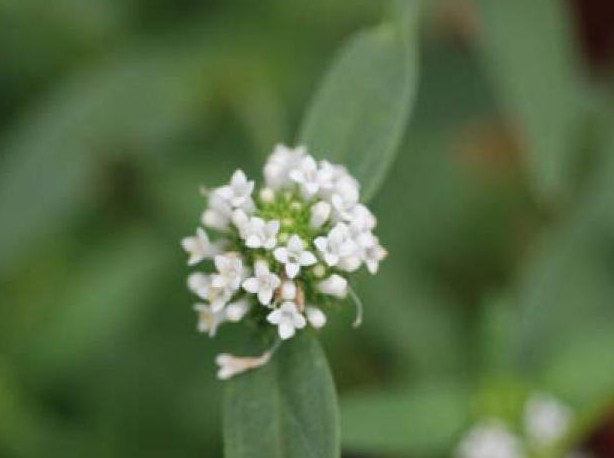

Conservation status
- Endangered (ESA)

Scientific classification
- Kingdom: Plantae
- Clade: Tracheophytes
- Clade: Angiosperms
- Clade: Eudicots
- Clade: Asterids
- Order: Gentianales
- Family: Rubiaceae
- Genus: Mitracarpus
- Species: M. maxwelliae

Binomial name
- Mitracarpus maxwelliae Britton & P.Wilson

= Mitracarpus maxwelliae =

Species of plant

Mitracarpus maxwelliae is a rare species of flowering plant in the coffee family known by the common name Maxwell's girdlepod. It is endemic to Puerto Rico, where it is known only from the Guánica Commonwealth Forest in Guánica. It grows in only one location in a coastal scrub forest and dwarf forest with limestone gravel substrates. Other plants in the habitat include Bucida buceras, Bursera simaruba, Exostema caribaeum, Coccoloba microstachya, Plumeria alba, and Pilosocereus armatus (syn. P. royenii var. amatus).

This is a small, dense, mound-forming shrub growing up to 20 centimeters in height. It has many four-angled branches with linear or lance-shaped leaves each 1 to 3 centimeters long. The inflorescence is a rounded head of tiny white flowers.

This is a federally listed endangered species of the United States. There are fewer than 1500 individuals left. The species is threatened by road construction and maintenance, and its small population size makes it vulnerable to extinction.
