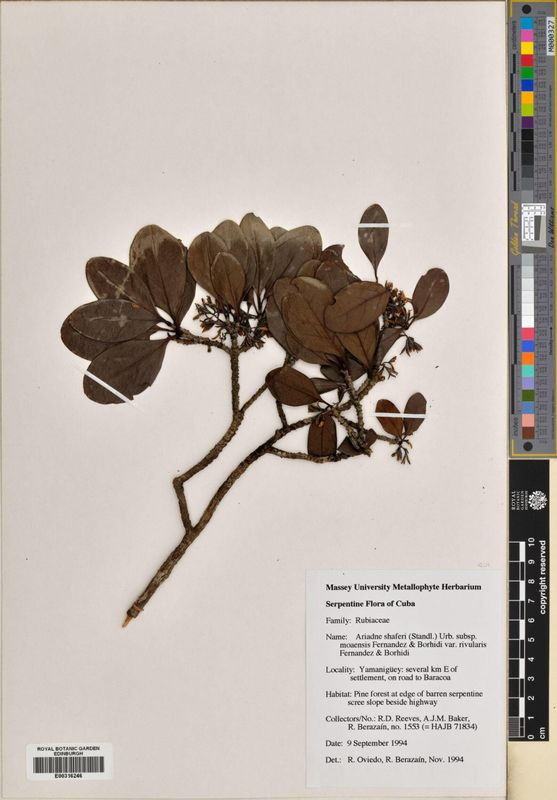

Scientific classification
- Kingdom: Plantae
- Clade: Embryophytes
- Clade: Tracheophytes
- Clade: Spermatophytes
- Clade: Angiosperms
- Clade: Eudicots
- Clade: Asterids
- Order: Gentianales
- Family: Rubiaceae
- Genus: Mazaea
- Species: M. shaferi

Binomial name
- Mazaea shaferi (Standl.) Delprete

Synonyms
- Ariadne shaferi (Standl.) Urb.; Neomazaea shaferi Standl.; Ariadne ekmanii Urb.; Ariadne shaferi subsp. moaensis M.Fernández & Borhidi; Ariadne shaferi var. rivularis M.Fernández & Borhidi

= Mazaea shaferi =

Species of flowering plant

Mazaea shaferi is a species of flowering plant in the family Rubiaceae. It is endemic to north-eastern Cuba. The species was first described in 1918, and received its current name in 1999.

Mazaea shaferi is a shrub that grows 1–3 metres (3.3–9.8 ft) high. The leaves are highly variable in shape. The inflorescences have twelve to thirty-five flowers. The fruits are dark brown capsules.

== Taxonomy ==
The species was first described as Neomazaea shaferi, by Paul Carpenter Standley, in 1918. However, Standley expressed doubt about its position within the genus Neomazaea. In 1923, Ignatz Urban moved the species to the genus Ariadne, and described it as conspecific with Ariadne ekmanii. In 1984, Fernández Zequeira and Attila Borhidi described two subspecies, and two varieties, of Ariadne shaferi, which are now treated as synonyms of M. shaferi. In 1999, Piero G. Delprete synonymized Ariadne with Mazaea, creating the new combination Mazaea shaferi.

The holotype was collected in 1909, from a rocky hillside in the Sierra de Nipe, in Nipe-Sagua-Baracoa. It was found at an elevation of 400–500 metres (1,300–1,600 ft).

== Distribution ==
Mazaea shaferi is native to the wet tropical biome of north-eastern Cuba (Holguín Province). It grows in serpentine barrens on mountain slopes, at elevations of 700–900 metres (2,300–3,000 ft).

== Description ==
Mazaea shaferi is a multi-stemmed shrub that grows 1–3 metres (3.3–9.8 ft) high. The leaves are clustered at the ends of branchlets. The young branchlets are 1–2 millimetres (0.039–0.079 in) thick, and cylindrical. The bark is smooth and light grey. The wood is white.

The leaves are variable in shape, even between specimens from the same area, and can be oblanceolate to broadly obovate. They are 30–65 millimetres (1.2–2.6 in) long, and 13–32 millimetres (0.51–1.26 in) wide. The upper surface is dark green, and the lower surface is pale green. The leaves turn reddish-brown when dry. The leaves have a papery texture, and lack hairs. The leaves have 3–5 millimetres (0.12–0.20 in) long.

The inflorescences are 8–35 millimetres (0.31–1.38 in) long, and have flowers on each terminal branch. Each inflorescence has twelve to thirty-five flowers. The flowers grow on 0.5–2 millimetres (0.020–0.079 in) stems. The calyx is circular and flattened. The calyx is either undivided, or has three or four round lobes. The lobes are 0.6–1.2 millimetres (0.024–0.047 in) long. The corolla is a short funnel, which is 3–4 millimetres (0.12–0.16 in) long. The corolla is white. The flowers have four or five stamens. The plant flowers from March to July.

The fruits are dark brown capsules, which are 6–18 millimetres (0.24–0.71 in) long, and 3–5 millimetres (0.12–0.20 in) wide. The capsules are obconical, have multiple ribs, and are usually smooth. They may have sparse, minute hairs. The plant fruits from April to August.

The ovary is divided into two locules, each of which has one or two seeds. The seeds are shield-shaped, 5–8 millimetres (0.20–0.31 in) long, 0.5–0.7 millimetres (0.020–0.028 in) wide, and have three ribs.
