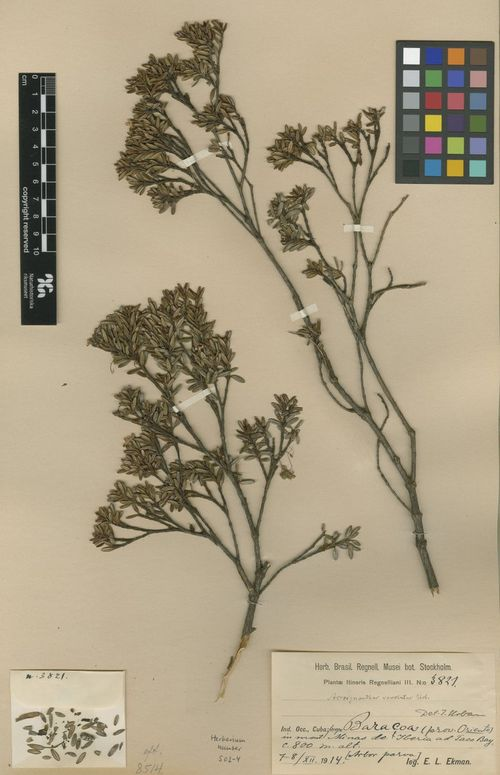
- Acrosynanthus revolutus

Scientific classification
- Kingdom: Plantae
- Clade: Embryophytes
- Clade: Tracheophytes
- Clade: Spermatophytes
- Clade: Angiosperms
- Clade: Eudicots
- Clade: Asterids
- Order: Gentianales
- Family: Rubiaceae
- Subfamily: Cinchonoideae
- Tribe: Rondeletieae
- Genus: Acrosynanthus; Urb.

Type species
- Acrosynanthus revolutus Urb.

= Acrosynanthus =

Genus of plants

Acrosynanthus is a genus of flowering plants in the family Rubiaceae. It is found in Cuba and Jamaica in the Caribbean.

Acrosynanthus are shrubs, with small leaves and tube shaped flowers.

== Species ==
7 species are accepted:

- Acrosynanthus jamaicensis Howard & Proctor - Jamaica
- Acrosynanthus latifolius Standl. - eastern Cuba
- Acrosynanthus minor Urb. - eastern Cuba
- Acrosynanthus ovatus Urb. - eastern Cuba
- Acrosynanthus parvifolius Britton ex Standl. - eastern Cuba
- Acrosynanthus revolutus Urb. - eastern Cuba
- Acrosynanthus trachyphyllus Standl. - Cuba

== Description ==
Acrosynanthus are shrubs. They are either hairless or have short soft hairs. The leaves are small, arranged alternately, and have short stems.

The corolla is funnel-shaped, has short hairs on the outside, and is hairless inside. The plants have six stamens.
