= Pedinopetalum =

Scientific classification
- Kingdom: Plantae
- Clade: Tracheophytes
- Clade: Angiosperms
- Clade: Eudicots
- Clade: Asterids
- Order: Apiales
- Family: Apiaceae
- Genus: Pedinopetalum; Urb. & H.Wolff

Genus of plants

Pedinopetalum is a genus of flowering plants belonging to the family Apiaceae.

Its native range is Hispaniola.

Species:

- Pedinopetalum domingense Urb. & H.Wolff
