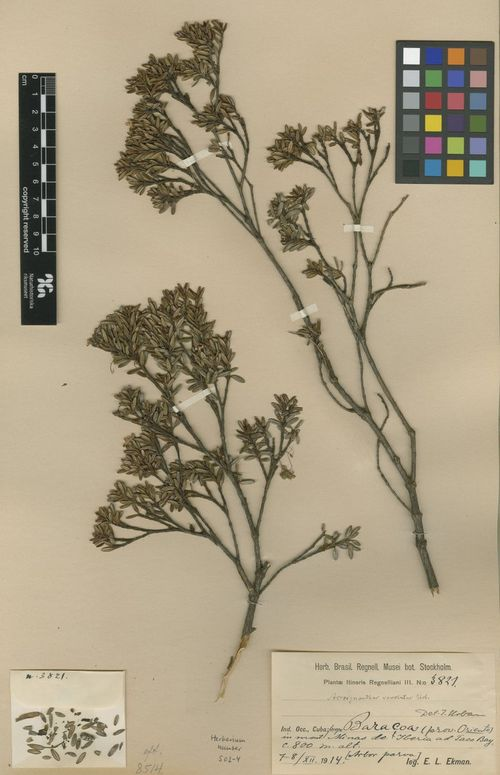

Scientific classification
- Kingdom: Plantae
- Clade: Embryophytes
- Clade: Tracheophytes
- Clade: Spermatophytes
- Clade: Angiosperms
- Clade: Eudicots
- Clade: Asterids
- Order: Gentianales
- Family: Rubiaceae
- Genus: Acrosynanthus
- Species: A. revolutus

Binomial name
- Acrosynanthus revolutus Urb.

= Acrosynanthus revolutus =

Species of flowering plant

Acrosynanthus revolutus is a species of flowering plant in the family Rubiaceae.

The species is a shrub or tree native to Cuba. It has thick, leathery leaves, and solitary flowers. It was described in 1913.

== Taxonomy ==
Acrosynanthus revolutus was described by Ignatz Urban in 1913. It is the type species of the genus Acrosynanthus.

== Distribution ==
Acrosynanthus revolutus is native to the wet tropical biome of eastern Cuba.

== Description ==
Acrosynanthus revolutus is a shrub 30–60 centimetres (0.98–1.97 ft) high, or a small tree around 4.5 metres (15 ft) high. The branches are stout, cylindrical, and gray to black in colour.

The leaves are thick, leathery, elliptical to oblong, 4–13 millimetres (0.16–0.51 in) long, and 2–3 millimetres (0.079–0.118 in) wide. They have 1.5–3 millimetres (0.059–0.118 in) stems. The leaves are shiny on the upper side, and whitish on the lower side. The leaf edges are rolled downwards.

The flowers are solitary, and the corolla is aroumd 7 millimetres (0.28 in) long.
