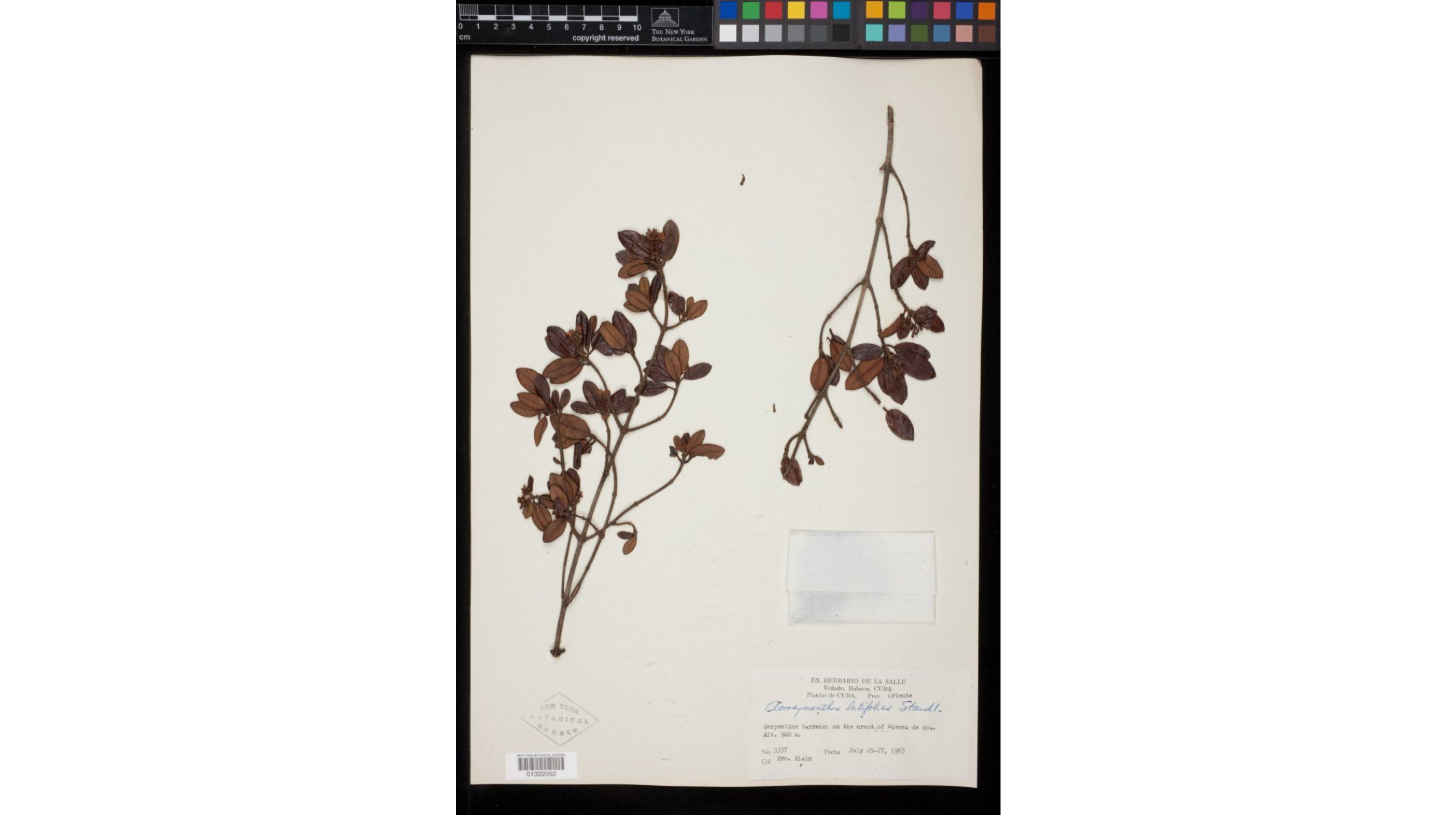

Scientific classification
- Kingdom: Plantae
- Clade: Embryophytes
- Clade: Tracheophytes
- Clade: Spermatophytes
- Clade: Angiosperms
- Clade: Eudicots
- Clade: Asterids
- Order: Gentianales
- Family: Rubiaceae
- Genus: Acrosynanthus
- Species: A. latifolius

Binomial name
- Acrosynanthus latifolius Standl.

Synonyms
- Acrosynanthus lucidus Britton ex Standl.

= Acrosynanthus latifolius =

Species of flowering plant

Acrosynanthus latifolius is a species of flowering plant in the family Rubiaceae. It is a shrub with small flowers and dark green leaves. The species is native to Cuba, and was described in 1918.

== Distribution ==
Acrosynanthus latifolius is native to the wet tropical biome of eastern Cuba.

== Taxonomy ==
John Adolph Shafer collected the type material from a rocky thicket in Oriente, Cuba. It was collected from an altitude of 900 metres (3,000 ft).

The species was described in 1918, by Paul Carpenter Standley.

== Description ==
Acrosynanthus latifolius is a straggling shrub, which grows 0.6–4.5 metres (2.0–14.8 ft) high. The branches are grey to black.

The leaves are dark green, thick, leathery, 2.5–5.5 centimetres (0.98–2.17 in) long, and 1.5–3 centimetres (0.59–1.18 in) wide. The leaves are oval to oval-oblong in shape, and grow on 3–6 millimetres (0.12–0.24 in) stems.

The floral cup is around 1 millimetre (0.039 in) long. The outer whorl has five or six lobes. The flowers have short or no stems. The fruit is a brown capsule, which is 3.5–4 millimetres (0.14–0.16 in) long.
