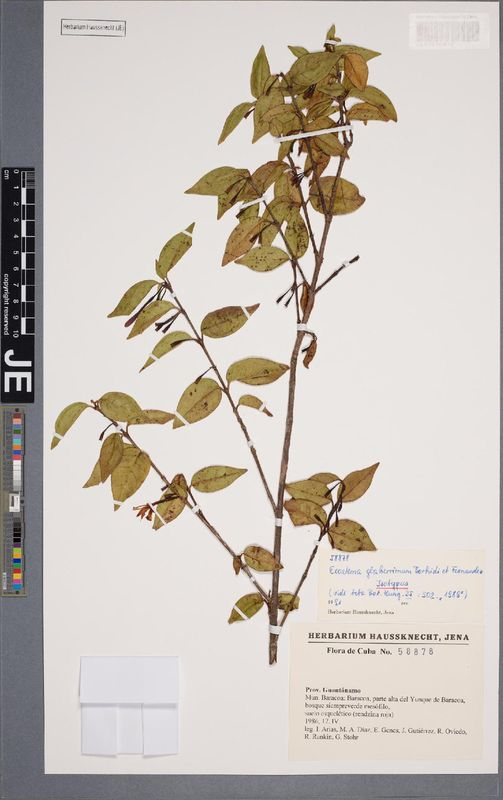

Conservation status
- Critically Endangered (IUCN 3.1)

Scientific classification
- Kingdom: Plantae
- Clade: Embryophytes
- Clade: Tracheophytes
- Clade: Spermatophytes
- Clade: Angiosperms
- Clade: Eudicots
- Clade: Asterids
- Order: Gentianales
- Family: Rubiaceae
- Genus: Exostema
- Species: E. glaberrimum

Binomial name
- Exostema glaberrimum Borhidi & M.Fernández

= Exostema glaberrimum =

Species of flowering plant

Exostema glaberrimum is a species of flowering plant in the family Rubiaceae. It is a shrub or tree native to Cuba. The species was described in 1989, and is listed as Critically Endangered by the IUCN.

== Taxonomy ==
The species was described by Attila Borhidi and Mayra Fernández in 1989.

== Distribution ==
Exostema glaberrimum is native to the wet tropical biome of Cuba. It has an estimated extent of occurrence of 4 square kilometres (1.5 sq mi). The species grows in rocky areas.

== Description ==
Exostema glaberrimum is a shrub or tree.

== Conservation ==
In 2022, the IUCN assessed Exostema glaberrimum as Critically Endangered.
