= Tainus =

Scientific classification
- Kingdom: Plantae
- Clade: Tracheophytes
- Clade: Angiosperms
- Clade: Eudicots
- Clade: Asterids
- Order: Gentianales
- Family: Rubiaceae
- Subfamily: Cinchonoideae
- Tribe: Rondeletieae
- Genus: Tainus; Torr.-Montúfar, H.Ochot. & Borsch (2017)
- Species: T. pitreanus

Binomial name
- Tainus pitreanus (Urb. & Ekman) Torr.-Montúfar, H.Ochot. & Borsch (2017)

Synonyms
- Rondeletia pitreana Urb. & Ekman (1929)

Genus of flowering plants

Tainus pitreanus is a species of flowering plant in the family Rubiaceae. It is a shrub or tree endemic to southern Hispaniola. It is the sole species in genus Tainus.
