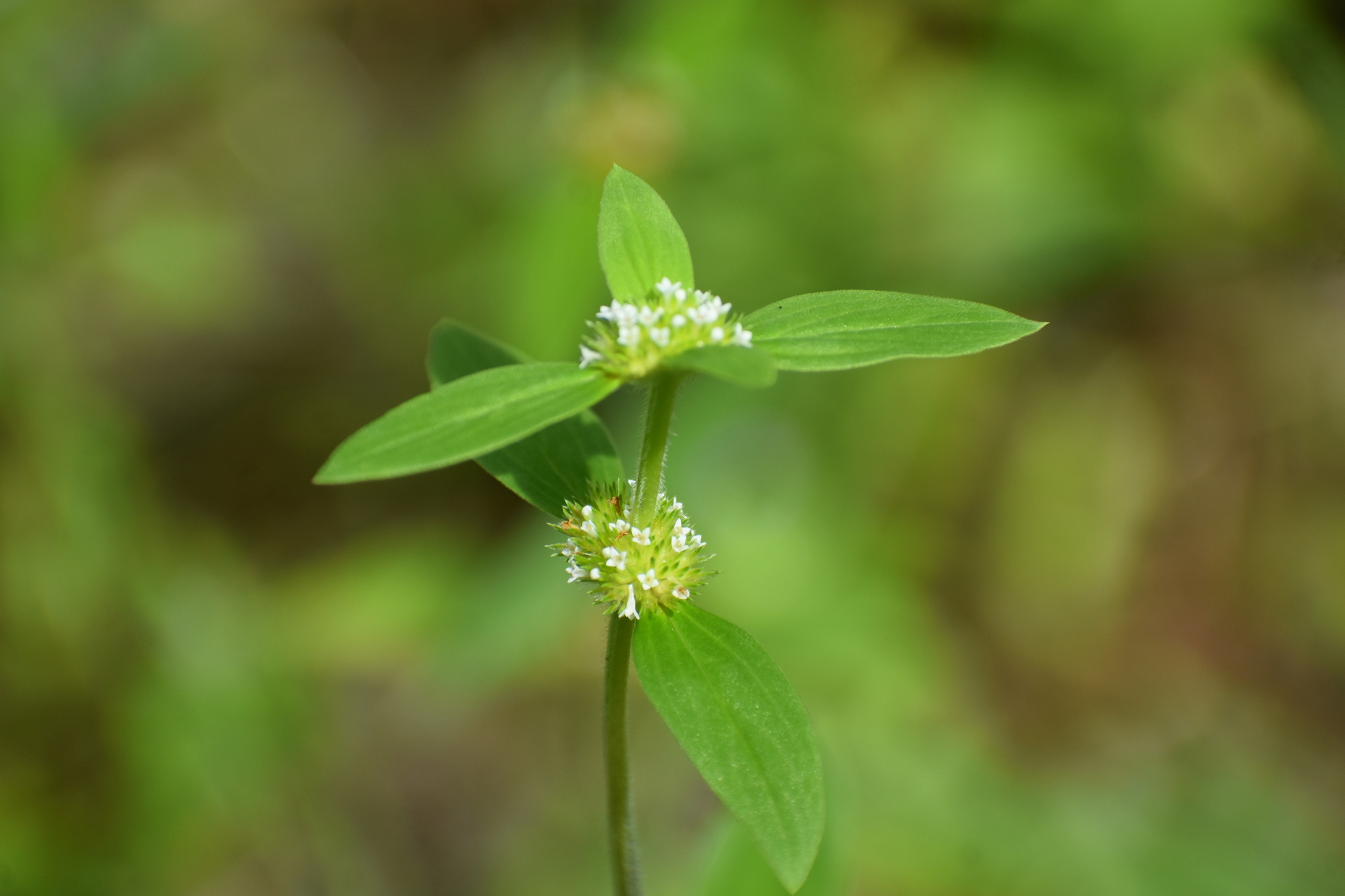

Scientific classification
- Kingdom: Plantae
- Clade: Embryophytes
- Clade: Tracheophytes
- Clade: Spermatophytes
- Clade: Angiosperms
- Clade: Eudicots
- Clade: Asterids
- Order: Gentianales
- Family: Rubiaceae
- Genus: Mitracarpus
- Species: M. hirtus

Binomial name
- Mitracarpus hirtus (L.) DC.

Synonyms
- List: Borreria ferruginea M.Martens & Galeotti; Borreria remotifolia DC.; Diodia villosa Moc. & Sessé ex DC.; Mitracarpus bakeri Urb.; Mitracarpus diffusus (Willd.) Cham. & Schltdl. ex DC.; Mitracarpus hirtus var. remotiflorus K.Schum.; Mitracarpus hirtus var. sessilis Tandyekk., Pandur. & N.Mohanan; Mitracarpus pallidus Hook. & Arn.; Mitracarpus pilosus A.Rich.; Mitracarpus scaber Zucc.; Mitracarpus schizangius var. angustifolius Oerst.; Mitracarpus senegalensis DC.; Mitracarpus simplex Rusby; Mitracarpus stylosus (Link) Cham. & Schltdl. ex DC.; Mitracarpus torresianus Cham. & Schltdl.; Mitracarpus verticillatus (Schumach. & Thonn.) Vatke; Mitracarpus villosus (Sw.) DC.; Mitracarpus villosus var. glabrior Oerst.; Spermacoce cephalotes Willd.; Spermacoce crassifolia DC.; Spermacoce declinata Pav. ex DC.; Spermacoce diffusa Kunth; Spermacoce diffusa Willd.; Spermacoce gracilis Pohl ex DC.; Spermacoce hirta L.; Spermacoce stylosa Link; Spermacoce villosa Sw.; Staurospermum verticillatum Schumach. & Thonn.

= Mitracarpus hirtus =

Species of plant

Mitracarpus hirtus, the tropical girdlepod, is a species of annual herb in the family Rubiaceae. It is native to Mexico and much of tropical America but has been widely introduced to Africa, Asia, and other tropical regions. The species typically grows in seasonally dry tropical biomes and is recognized by its small, white, funnel-shaped flowers arranged in leaf axils.

== Ecology ==
Mitracarpus hirtus is insect pollinated and is recorded to have been visited in northern Florida by Augochloropsis metallica.
