= Donnellyanthus =

Conservation status
- Least Concern (IUCN 3.1)

Scientific classification
- Kingdom: Plantae
- Clade: Tracheophytes
- Clade: Angiosperms
- Clade: Eudicots
- Clade: Asterids
- Order: Gentianales
- Family: Rubiaceae
- Subfamily: Cinchonoideae
- Tribe: Rondeletieae
- Genus: Donnellyanthus; Borhidi
- Species: D. deamii

Binomial name
- Donnellyanthus deamii (Donn.Sm.) Borhidi

Synonyms
- Arachnothryx deamii (Donn.Sm.) Borhidi; Bouvardia deamii Donn.Sm.; Rondeletia deamii (Donn.Sm.) Standl.

Genus of plants

Donnellyanthus is a monotypic genus of flowering plants in the family Rubiaceae. The genus contains a single species, Donnellyanthus deamii, a shrub native to Oaxaca, El Salvador, Guatemala, Honduras, and Nicaragua.
