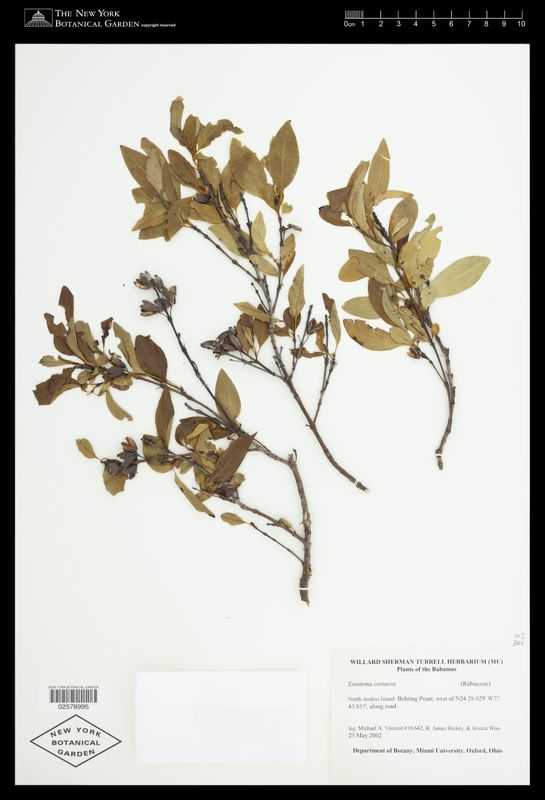

Conservation status
- Data Deficient (IUCN 3.1)

Scientific classification
- Kingdom: Plantae
- Clade: Embryophytes
- Clade: Tracheophytes
- Clade: Spermatophytes
- Clade: Angiosperms
- Clade: Eudicots
- Clade: Asterids
- Order: Gentianales
- Family: Rubiaceae
- Genus: Exostema
- Species: E. coriaceum

Binomial name
- Exostema coriaceum Roem. & Schult.

Synonyms
- Cinchona coriacea Poir.

= Exostema coriaceum =

Species of flowering plant

Exostema coriaceum is a species of flowering plant in the family Rubiaceae. It is a shrub native to Hispaniola. The species was described in 1804, and is listed as Data Deficient by the IUCN.

== Taxonomy ==
The species was first described in 1804, by Jean Louis Marie Poiret, and placed in the genus Cinchona. In 1819, Johann Jacob Roemer and Josef August Schultes described the species under its current name. The type specimen was collected at an unknown location in Saint-Domingue.

== Distribution ==
Exostema coriaceum is native to the wet tropial biome of Haiti. It is endemic to Hispaniola, and possibly the Bahamas. It is sometimes considered endemic to Haiti, though it has not been found there since the late 18th century.

The species is present at elevations of 5–40 metres (16–131 ft), and grows in subtropical dry forests.

== Description ==
Exostema coriaceum is a small woody shrub.

== Conservation ==
In 2021, the IUCN listed Exostema coriaceum as Data Deficient, due to a lack of information on its taxonomy. Habitat loss and extreme weather may be threats to the species.
