= Ignurbia =

Scientific classification
- Kingdom: Plantae
- Clade: Tracheophytes
- Clade: Angiosperms
- Clade: Eudicots
- Clade: Asterids
- Order: Asterales
- Family: Asteraceae
- Tribe: Senecioneae
- Subtribe: Senecioninae
- Genus: Ignurbia; B.Nord.
- Species: I. constanzae

Binomial name
- Ignurbia constanzae (Urb.) B.Nord.

Synonyms
- Senecio constanzae Urb.

Genus of flowering plants

Ignurbia is a genus of flowering plants in the family Asteraceae. It contains a single species, Ignurbia constanzae, which is endemic to Hispaniola. It is an erect, little-branched, suffrutescent herb which grows from 0.5 to 2 meters tall. It is native to montane humid forest, broad-leaved scrub, and along streams from 1250 to 2400 meters elevation, often growing with Brunellia comocladifolia, Garrya fadyenii, and sometimes Pinus occidentalis.

The species was first described as Senecio constanzae by Ignatz Urban in 1912. In 2006 Bertil Nordenstam placed the species in a new monotypic genus, Ignurbia, which he named in honor of Urban.
