= Jamaicanthus =

Scientific classification
- Kingdom: Plantae
- Clade: Tracheophytes
- Clade: Angiosperms
- Clade: Eudicots
- Clade: Asterids
- Order: Gentianales
- Family: Rubiaceae
- Subfamily: Cinchonoideae
- Tribe: Rondeletieae
- Genus: Jamaicanthus; Borhidi (2018)
- Species: J. laurifolius

Binomial name
- Jamaicanthus laurifolius (Sw.) Borhidi (2018)

Synonyms
- Rondeletia laurifolia Sw. (1797)

Genus of flowering plants

Jamaicanthus laurifolius is a species of flowering plant in the family Rubiaceae. It is a shrub endemic to Jamaica. It is the sole species in genus Jamaicanthus.

It was first named Rondeletia laurifolia by Olof Swartz in 1797. In 2018 Attila Borhidi renamed the species Jamaicanthus laurifolius, placing it in its own genus.
