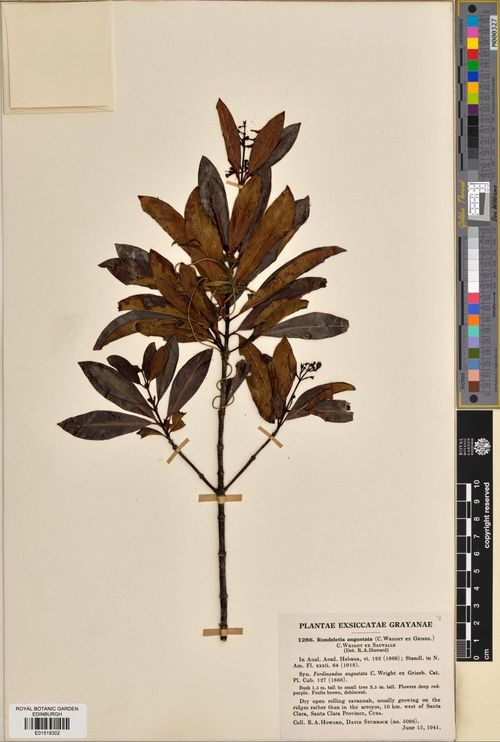

Scientific classification
- Kingdom: Plantae
- Clade: Embryophytes
- Clade: Tracheophytes
- Clade: Spermatophytes
- Clade: Angiosperms
- Clade: Eudicots
- Clade: Asterids
- Order: Gentianales
- Family: Rubiaceae
- Genus: Suberanthus
- Species: S. neriifolius

Binomial name
- Suberanthus neriifolius (A.Rich.) Borhidi & M.Fernández

Synonyms
- Exostema neriifolium A.Rich.; Rondeletia neriifolia (A.Rich.) Urb.; Rondeletia calcicola Britton; Rondeletia neriifolia var. calcicola (Britton) Alain; Rondeletia neriifolia subsp. calcicola (Britton) Borhidi

= Suberanthus neriifolius =

Species of flowering plant

Suberanthus neriifolius is a species of flowering plant in the family Rubiaceae. It is a shrub native to Cuba. The species was first described as Exostema neriifolium by Achille Richard in 1850. In 1982 Attila Borhidi and Mayra Fernández placed the species in genus Suberanthus as S. neriifolius.

== Distribution ==
Suberanthus neriifolius is native to the dry tropical biome of Cuba. The type locality is on Cuba's Isla de la Juventud.

== Description ==
Suberanthus neriifolius is a shrub. The plants are hairless throughout. The branches are stout and greyish-brown.

The leaves are thick, leathery in texture, and oblong or lancelolate in shape. Leaves measure 6.5–10.5 centimetres (2.6–4.1 in) in length, and 1–2 centimetres (0.39–0.79 in) in width. The leaf stalks are 3–9 millimetres (0.12–0.35 in) long. The stalks produce a thin but prominent midrib on the leaf.

The plants have dry, reddish-brown fruits, which are oblong or pear-shaped. The flower stalks are 2–4 millimetres (0.079–0.157 in) long. The seeds are yellowish-brown, 3–4 millimetres (0.12–0.16 in) long, and have wings.
