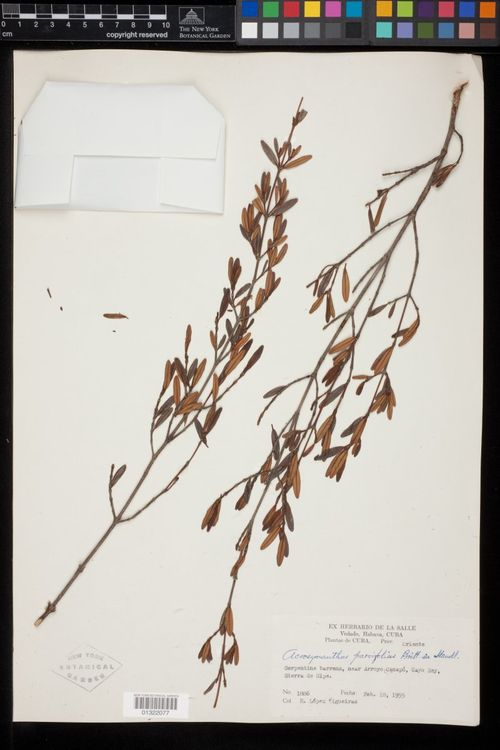

Scientific classification
- Kingdom: Plantae
- Clade: Embryophytes
- Clade: Tracheophytes
- Clade: Spermatophytes
- Clade: Angiosperms
- Clade: Eudicots
- Clade: Asterids
- Order: Gentianales
- Family: Rubiaceae
- Genus: Acrosynanthus
- Species: A. parvifolius

Binomial name
- Acrosynanthus parvifolius Britton ex Standl.

= Acrosynanthus parvifolius =

Species of flowering plant

Acrosynanthus parvifolius is a species of flowering plant in the family Rubiaceae. It is a shrub or tree with thick leaves. The species is native to eastern Cuba, and was described in 1918.

== Taxonomy ==
The species' name was published by Paul Carpenter Standley in 1918. Standley attributed the name to Nathaniel Lord Britton.

== Distribution ==
Acrosynanthus parvifolius is native to the wet tropical biome of eastern Cuba. It grows in dry soil. The type specimen was collected at an altitude between 450–550 metres (1,480–1,800 ft).

== Description ==
Acrosynanthus parvifolius is a shrub or tree. It can grow up to 3.6 metres (12 ft) high. The trunk and branches are grey to greyish-brown.

The plant has thick, leathery, hairless leaves, which are green on the upperside, and brown on the underside. The leaves are linear-oblong in shape, 1–2 centimetres (0.39–0.79 in) long, and 2–5 millimetres (0.079–0.197 in) wide. The leaves have 1–3 millimetres (0.039–0.118 in) stems.

The flowers grow on 1.5–2.5 millimetres (0.059–0.098 in) stems. The capsule is reddish-brown, obovoid, and 2.5–3 millimetres (0.098–0.118 in) long.
