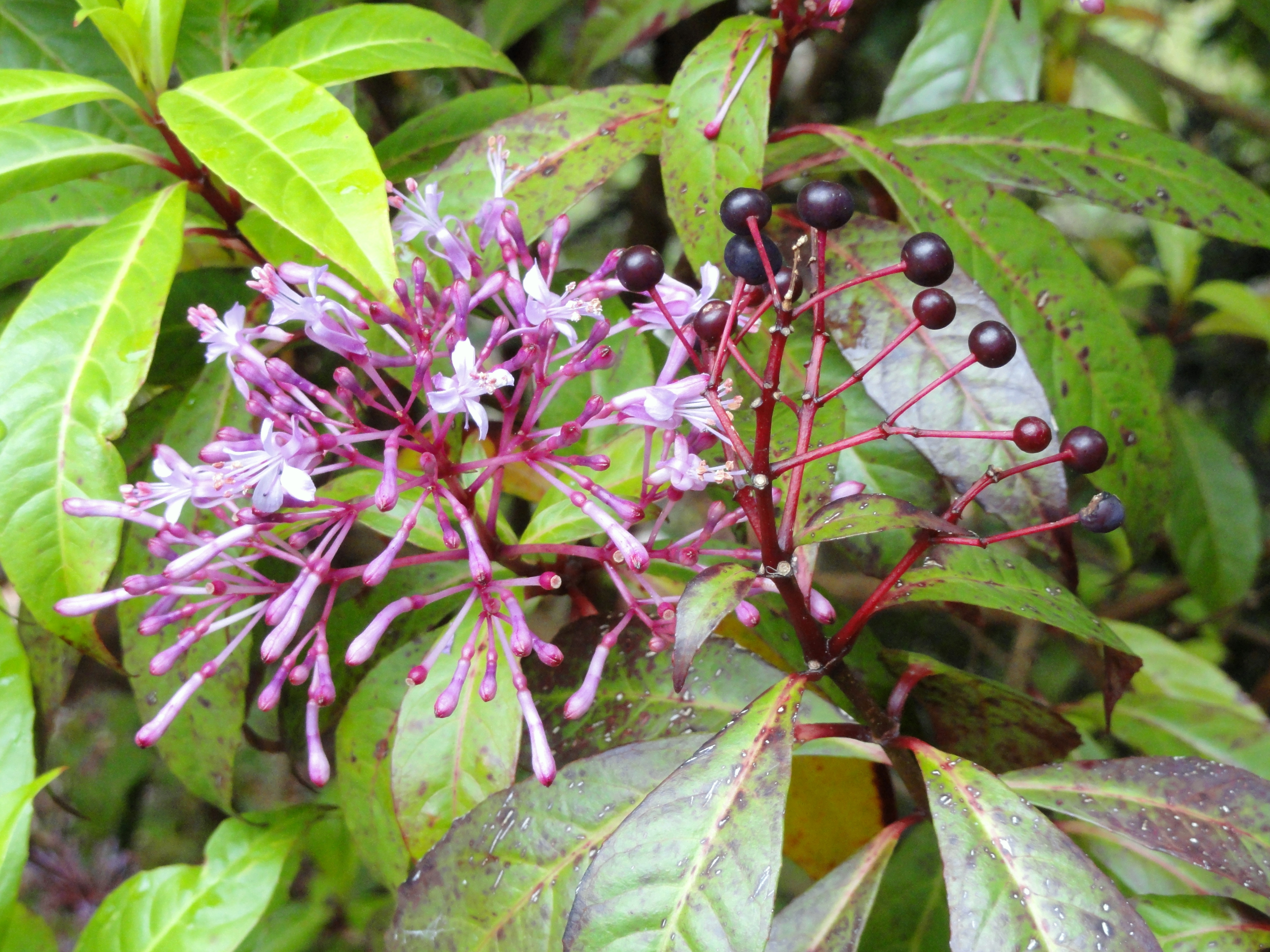
- Roveanthus strigosus

Scientific classification
- Kingdom: Plantae
- Clade: Tracheophytes
- Clade: Angiosperms
- Clade: Eudicots
- Clade: Asterids
- Order: Gentianales
- Family: Rubiaceae
- Tribe: Rondeletieae
- Genus: Rovaeanthus; Borhidi

= Rovaeanthus =

Genus of plants

Rovaeanthus is a genus of flowering plants belonging to the family Rubiaceae.

Its native range is southern Mexico to Central America. It is found in El Salvador, Guatemala, Honduras, Mexico and Nicaragua.

The genus name of Rovaeanthus is in honour of Johan H. E. Rova (fl. 1990 – 2002), a Swedish botanist at the University of Gothenburg. It was first described and published in Acta Bot. Hung. Vol.46 on page 130 in 2004.

Species, according to Kew:

- Rovaeanthus strigosus (Benth.) Borhidi
- Rovaeanthus suffrutescens (Brandegee) Borhidi
