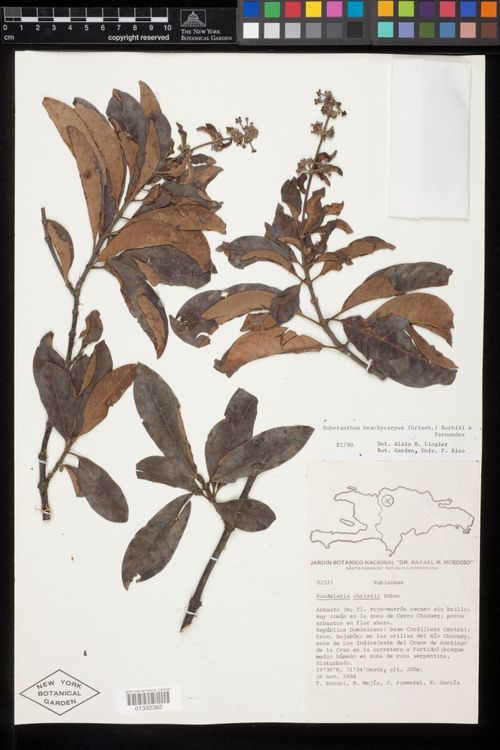

Scientific classification
- Kingdom: Plantae
- Clade: Tracheophytes
- Clade: Angiosperms
- Clade: Eudicots
- Clade: Asterids
- Order: Gentianales
- Family: Rubiaceae
- Genus: Suberanthus
- Species: S. brachycarpus

Binomial name
- Suberanthus brachycarpus (Griseb.) Borhidi & M.Fernández

Synonyms
- Ferdinandea brachycarpa Griseb.; Rondeletia brachycarpa (Griseb.) C.Wright; Ferdinandea brachycarpa var. hispidula Griseb.; Rondeletia camagueyensis Britton; Rondeletia elliptica Urb.; Rondeletia ternifolia Urb.

= Suberanthus brachycarpus =

Species of flowering plant

Suberanthus brachycarpus is a species of flowering plant in the Rubiaceae family. It is a shrub or tree with dark green leaves and whitish flowers. The species is native to Cuba and the island of Hispaniola.

The first description of Suberanthus brachycarpus was published in 1982.

== Distribution ==
Suberanthus brachycarpus is native to the wet tropical biomes of Cuba, the Dominican Republic, and Haiti. It grows in thickets and on hillsides. The type locality is Santa Catalina, Oriente Province, Cuba.

== Description ==
Suberanthus brachycarpus is a shrub or tree. It grows 3–4 metres (9.8–13.1 ft) high. The branches are stout, cylindrical, and dark brown or greyish in colour. When young, the plant has minute hairs.

The leaves are dark green, with paler undersides. They are leathery in texture, and oval, oblong, or elliptical in shape. The leaves are 2–11 centimetres (0.79–4.33 in) long, and 1–4.5 centimetres (0.39–1.77 in) wide. The leaf stalks are 2–7 millimetres (0.079–0.276 in) long, and form a prominent midrib on the leaf. The stalks have bristle-like hairs.

The flowers have short stalks, or are attached without one. The floral cup is whitish, and has bristle-like hairs.

The fruits are reddish-brown, 6–7 millimetres (0.24–0.28 in) long, and approximately spherical. The seeds are winged, yellowish, and about 3 millimetres (0.12 in) long.

== Ecology ==
Suberanthus brachycarpus is a host of the fungi Meliola psychotriae and Meliola isochaeta.
