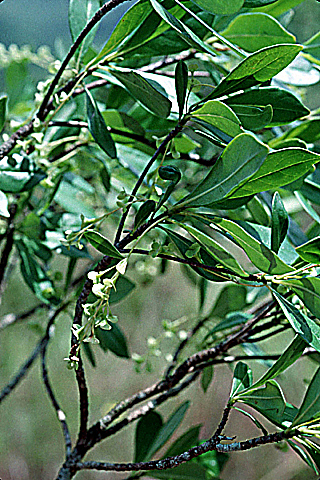

Scientific classification
- Kingdom: Plantae
- Clade: Tracheophytes
- Clade: Angiosperms
- Clade: Eudicots
- Clade: Asterids
- Order: Gentianales
- Family: Rubiaceae
- Subfamily: Cinchonoideae
- Tribe: Rondeletieae
- Genus: Acunaeanthus; Borhidi, Komlodi & Moncada
- Species: A. tinifolius

Binomial name
- Acunaeanthus tinifolius (Griseb.) Borhidi, Komlodi & Moncada

Synonyms
- Mazaea tinifolia (Griseb.) Alain; Neomazaea tinifolia (Griseb.) Urb.; Rondeletia tinifolia Griseb.; Exostema leonis Standl.

= Acunaeanthus =

Genus of flowering plants

Acunaeanthus is a monotypic genus of flowering plants in the family of Rubiaceae. The genus contains only one known species; Acunaeanthus tinifolius, which is endemic to Cuba.

The genus name of Acunaeanthus is in honour of Julián Acuña Galé (1900–1973), a Cuban botanist who served as director of the Agricultural Experimental Station in Santiago de Las Vegas. The Latin specific epithet of tinifolius with leaves like Laurustinus (Viburnum tinus). Both the genus and the species were first described and published in Acta Bot. Acad. Sci. Hung. Vol.26 on page 282 (1980, published in 1981).
