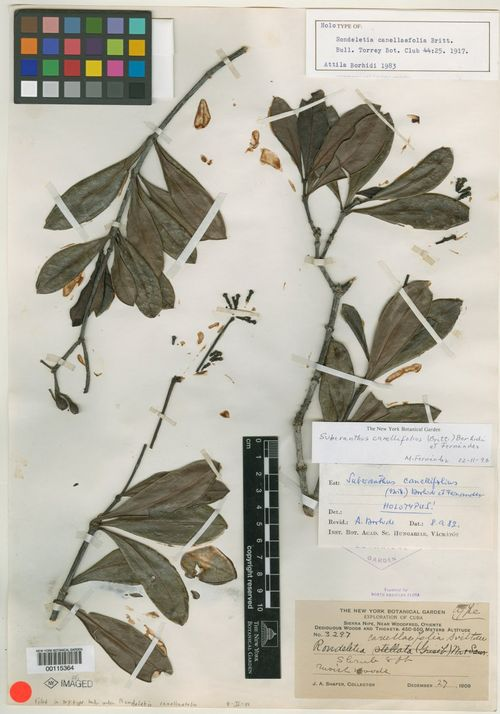

Scientific classification
- Kingdom: Plantae
- Clade: Tracheophytes
- Clade: Angiosperms
- Clade: Eudicots
- Clade: Asterids
- Order: Gentianales
- Family: Rubiaceae
- Genus: Suberanthus
- Species: S. canellifolius

Binomial name
- Suberanthus canellifolius (Britton) Borhidi & M.Fernández

Synonyms
- Rondeletia canellifolia Britton; Rondeletia stellata subsp. canellifolia (Britton) Borhidi

= Suberanthus canellifolius =

Species of flowering plant

Suberanthus canellifolius is a species of flowering plant in the family Rubiaceae. It is native to the wet tropical biome of Eastern Cuba.

The first description of the species was published in 1982. It was described by Attila Borhidi and Mayra Fernández.

The holotype is at the New York Botanical Garden's herbarium.
