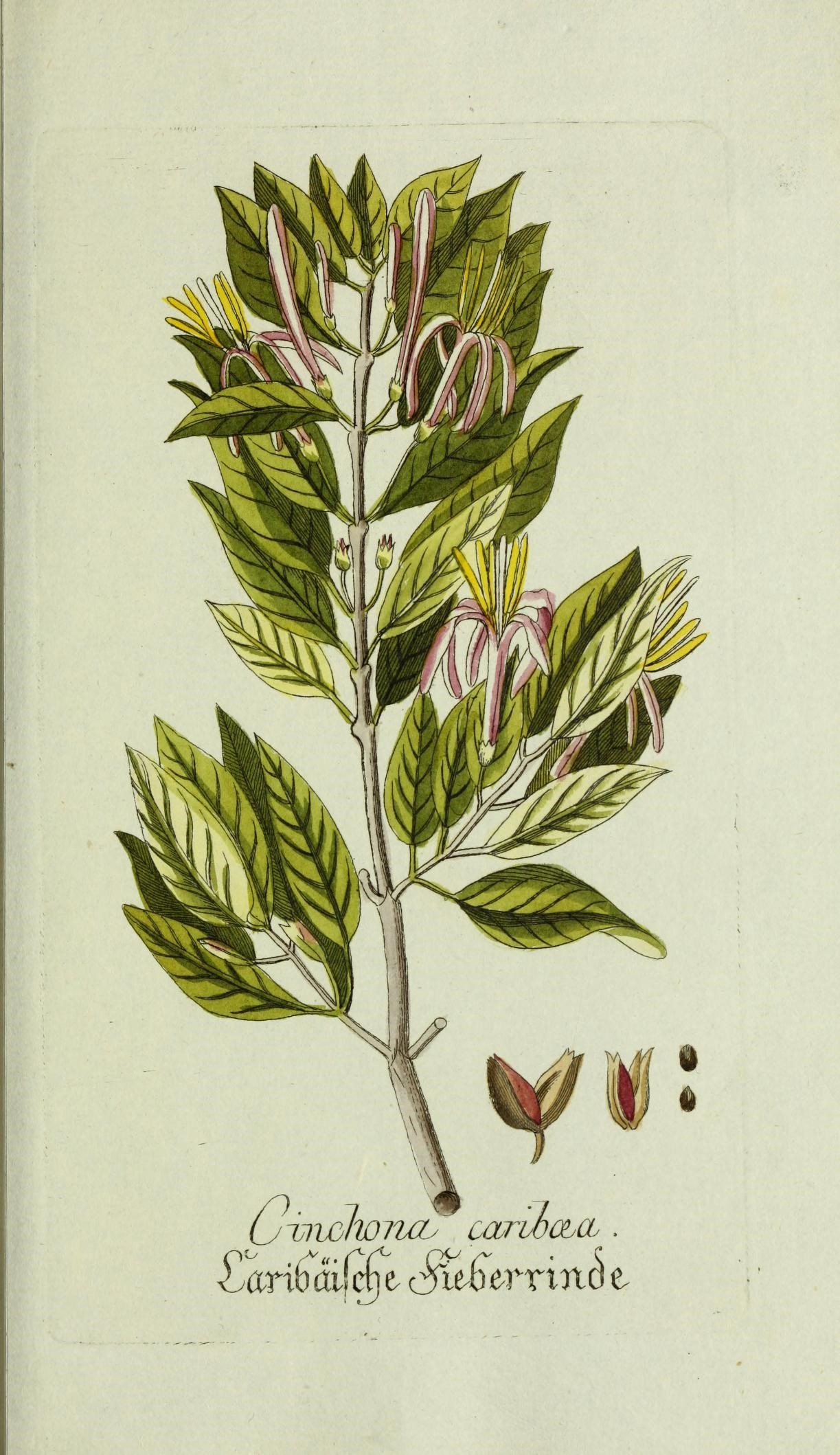
- Illustration of Exostema caribaeum

Scientific classification
- Kingdom: Plantae
- Clade: Embryophytes
- Clade: Tracheophytes
- Clade: Angiosperms
- Clade: Eudicots
- Clade: Asterids
- Order: Gentianales
- Family: Rubiaceae
- Subfamily: Cinchonoideae
- Tribe: Chiococceae
- Genus: Exostema (Pers.) Bonpl.

Type species
- Exostema caribaeum (Jacq.) Schult.

Synonyms
- Solenandra Hook.f.; Steudelago Kuntze

= Exostema =

Genus of flowering plants

Exostema is a genus of flowering plants in the family Rubiaceae. It consists of trees and shrubs, endemic to the neotropics, with most of the species occurring in the West Indies.

== Description ==
Exostema is a genus of neotropical trees and shrubs. The flowers have a slender corolla tube with recurved corolla lobes. The stamens are inserted near the base of the corolla tube and exserted well beyond its mouth. The anthers are long and basifixed.

== Systematics ==
The type species for the genus is Exostema caribaeum. It is a tree of Central America and the Caribbean. Its lumber is of limited use.

Exostema was first named by Christiaan Hendrik Persoon as a subgenus of Cinchona. It was first validly published as a genus by Aimé Bonpland in 1807. The generic name is derived from the Ancient Greek words, exo, meaning "outside", and stema, "stamen".

As circumscribed in 2010, Exostema was probably polyphyletic. Species have since been moved to other genera.

=== Species ===
As of May 2026, Plants of the World Online accepted the following species:

- Exostema acuminatum Urb.
- Exostema caribaeum (Jacq.) Schult.
- Exostema coriaceum (Poir.) Schult.
- Exostema glaberrimum Borhidi & M.Fernández
- Exostema lancifolium Borhidi & Acuña
- Exostema nitens Urb.
- Exostema purpureum Griseb.
- Exostema salicifolium Griseb.
- Exostema spinosum (Le Vavass.) Krug & Urb.
