= Suberanthus =

Scientific classification
- Kingdom: Plantae
- Clade: Tracheophytes
- Clade: Angiosperms
- Clade: Eudicots
- Clade: Asterids
- Order: Gentianales
- Family: Rubiaceae
- Subfamily: Cinchonoideae
- Tribe: Rondeletieae
- Genus: Suberanthus; Borhidi & M.Fernández

Genus of flowering plants

Suberanthus is a genus of flowering plants in the family Rubiaceae. It includes seven species native to Cuba and Hispaniola.

== Species ==
Seven species and two naturally-occurring interspecies hybrids are accepted.

- Suberanthus × angustatus (C.Wright ex Griseb.) Borhidi (S. brachycarpus × S. neriifolius)
- Suberanthus brachycarpus (Griseb.) Borhidi & M.Fernández
- Suberanthus canellifolius (Britton) Borhidi & M.Fernández
- Suberanthus hincheanus (Urb. & Ekman) Borhidi
- Suberanthus neriifolius (A.Rich.) Borhidi & M.Fernández
- Suberanthus × nipensis Borhidi & M.Fernández (S. brachycarpus × S. canellifolius)
- Suberanthus pungens (Urb.) Borhidi
- Suberanthus stellatus (Griseb.) Borhidi & M.Fernández
- Suberanthus yumuriensis (Britton) Borhidi & M.Fernández
