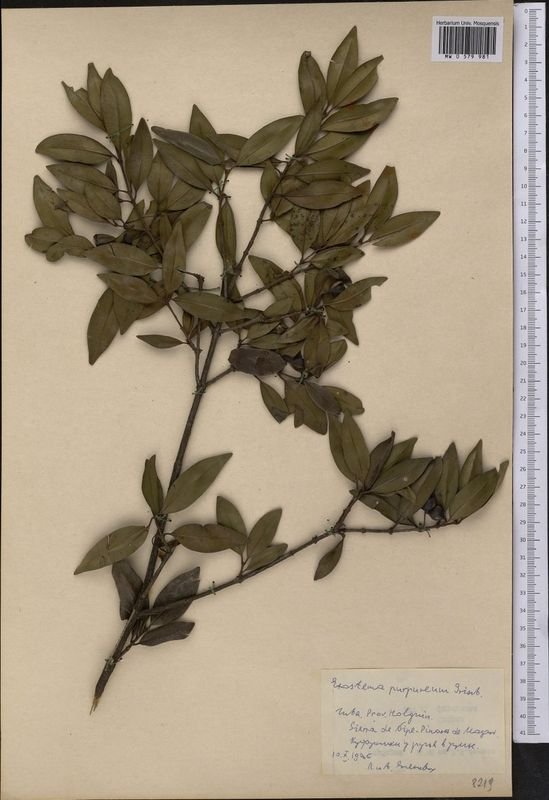

Conservation status
- Least Concern (IUCN 3.1)

Scientific classification
- Kingdom: Plantae
- Clade: Embryophytes
- Clade: Tracheophytes
- Clade: Angiosperms
- Clade: Eudicots
- Clade: Asterids
- Order: Gentianales
- Family: Rubiaceae
- Genus: Exostema
- Species: E. purpureum

Binomial name
- Exostema purpureum Griseb.

Synonyms
- Exostema purpureum subsp. avenium Borhidi & M.Fernández; Exostema purpureum var. mensurense Kitan.; Exostema revolutum Borhidi & M.Fernández

= Exostema purpureum =

Species of flowering plant

Exostema purpureum is a species of flowering plant in the family Rubiaceae. It is a shrub or tree with thickly leathery leaves, purple flowers, and capsule fruits. The species is native to Cuba.

Exostema purpureum was described in 1866, and is listed as of Least Concern by the IUCN.

== Taxonomy ==
Exostema purpureum was described by August Grisebach in 1866. The type locality is near Baracoa.

== Distribution ==
Exostema purpureum is native to the wet tropical biome of eastern Cuba. It grows in dry watercoures, thickets, forests, and shrublands.

== Description ==
Exostema purpureum is a shrub or tree that grows 0.2–1.5 metres (0.66–4.92 ft) high. The branches are stout, and grey or brown in colour.

The leaf stems are 2.5–7 millimetres (0.098–0.276 in) long. The leaves are lanceolate, oblong, ovate, or elliptical in shape. The leaves are 3.5–6.5 centimetres (1.4–2.6 in) long, 1.5–2.5 centimetres (0.59–0.98 in) wide, and thickly leathery.

The hypanthium is ellipsoid, and 4–5 millimetres (0.16–0.20 in) long. The calyx has five triangular lobes. The corolla is around 1.5 centimetres (0.59 in) long, purple on the outside, and rose-coloured on the inside.

The fruit is a smooth, ellipsoid capsule, measuring around 1.5 centimetres (0.59 in) long.

== Conservation ==
In 2023, the IUCN listed Exostema purpureum as of Least Concern.
