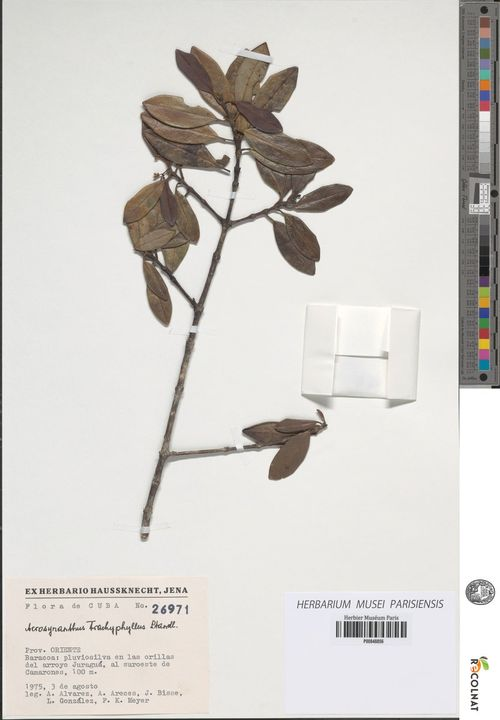

Scientific classification
- Kingdom: Plantae
- Clade: Embryophytes
- Clade: Tracheophytes
- Clade: Spermatophytes
- Clade: Angiosperms
- Clade: Eudicots
- Clade: Asterids
- Order: Gentianales
- Family: Rubiaceae
- Genus: Acrosynanthus
- Species: A. trachyphyllus

Binomial name
- Acrosynanthus trachyphyllus Standl.

= Acrosynanthus trachyphyllus =

Species of flowering plant

Acrosynanthus trachyphyllus is a species of flowering plant in the family Rubiaceae. The species has rigid, leathery leaves, and stout branches. It is native to Cuba, and was described in 1918.

== Taxonomy ==
The species was named by Paul Carpenter Standley in 1918. The type specimen was collected in Baracoa, Cuba, in 1917.

== Distribution ==
Acrosynanthus trachyphyllus is native to the wet tropical biome of Cuba.

== Description ==
Acrosynanthus trachyphyllus has stout, blackish branches.

The leaves are rigid and leathery, oblong to lanceolate in shape, 5–9.5 centimetres (2.0–3.7 in) long, and 1.6–3 centimetres (0.63–1.18 in) wide. The upper surface of the leaves are dark green and lustrous, and the lower surfaces are pale brown. The leaf stems are 5–13 millimetres (0.20–0.51 in) long.

The corolla is around 5 millimetres (0.20 in) long. The outside of the corolla has fine, short hairs. The inflorescences have few flowers, which grow on 2–3 millimetres (0.079–0.118 in) stems.
