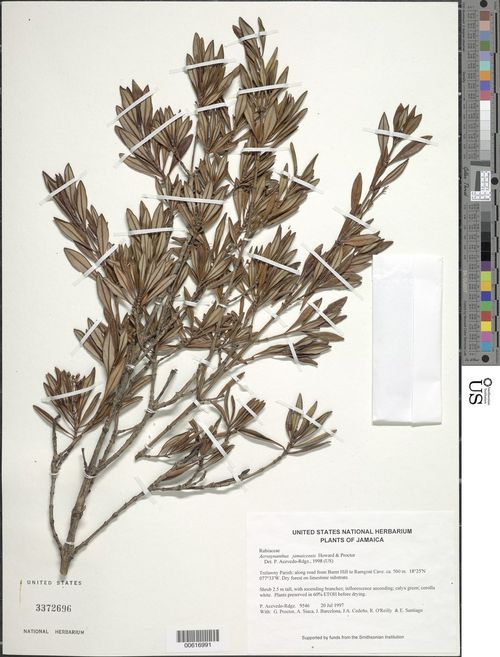

Scientific classification
- Kingdom: Plantae
- Clade: Embryophytes
- Clade: Tracheophytes
- Clade: Spermatophytes
- Clade: Angiosperms
- Clade: Eudicots
- Clade: Asterids
- Order: Gentianales
- Family: Rubiaceae
- Genus: Acrosynanthus
- Species: A. jamaicensis

Binomial name
- Acrosynanthus jamaicensis R.A.Howard & Proctor

= Acrosynanthus jamaicensis =

Species of flowering plant

Acrosynanthus jamaicensis is a species of flowering plant in the family Rubiaceae. It is a shrub with pale brown fruits.

The species is native to Jamaica. It was described by Richard A. Howard and George R. Proctor in 1958.

== Distribution ==
Acrosynanthus jamaicensis is native to the wet tropical biome of Jamaica. It was the first species of Acrosynanthus known from outside of Cuba. The type material was collected from the sides of a limestone ravine in Trelawny Parish, Jamaica.

== Description ==
Acrosynanthus jamaicensis is a shrub, around 3 metres (9.8 ft) tall. The leaves are 3–4.5 centimetres (1.2–1.8 in) long, and 4–8 millimetres (0.16–0.31 in) wide. The fruits are 3 millimetres (0.12 in) in diameter, and pale brown when mature. The leaves and young stems have a resinous coating.
