= Phyllomelia =

Conservation status
- Critically Endangered (IUCN 3.1)

Scientific classification
- Kingdom: Plantae
- Clade: Tracheophytes
- Clade: Angiosperms
- Clade: Eudicots
- Clade: Asterids
- Order: Gentianales
- Family: Rubiaceae
- Subfamily: Cinchonoideae
- Tribe: Rondeletieae
- Genus: Phyllomelia; Griseb.
- Species: P. coronata

Binomial name
- Phyllomelia coronata Griseb.

Genus of plants

Phyllomelia is a genus of flowering plants belonging to the family Rubiaceae. It includes a single species, Phyllomelia coronata, a shrub or tree endemic to western Cuba. It grows in thorny xeromorphic scrub on serpentine soil, on shallow rocky soils, and near watercourses. It is threatened with habitat loss from deforestation, invasive plants, and expansion of forest plantations.

Both genus and species were described in 1866 by August Grisebach.
