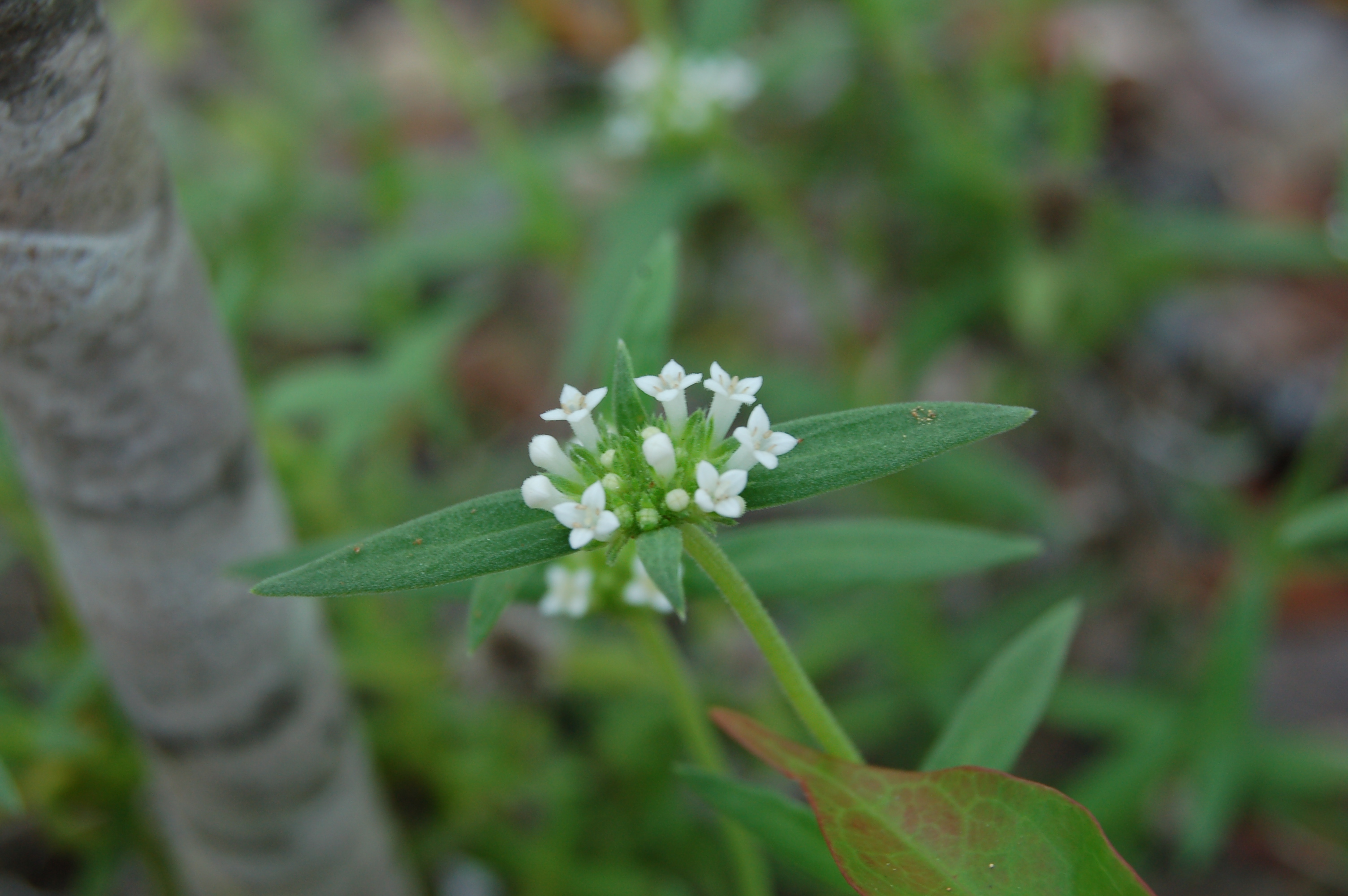
- Mitracarpus maxwelliae

Scientific classification
- Kingdom: Plantae
- Clade: Tracheophytes
- Clade: Angiosperms
- Clade: Eudicots
- Clade: Asterids
- Order: Gentianales
- Family: Rubiaceae
- Subfamily: Rubioideae
- Tribe: Spermacoceae
- Genus: Mitracarpus; Zucc.

Species
- See text

Synonyms
- Schizangium Bartl. ex DC.; Staurospermum Thonn.

= Mitracarpus =

Genus of plants

Mitracarpus is a plant genus in the coffee family Rubiaceae. Girdlepod is a common name for some species in this genus.

== Species ==
As of January 2026, Plants of the World Online accepts the following 64 species:

- Mitracarpus acunae Alain
- Mitracarpus albomarginatus E.B.Souza
- Mitracarpus anthospermoides K.Schum.
- Mitracarpus aristatus Borhidi & Lozada-Pérez
- Mitracarpus bacigalupoae E.L.Cabral, W.A.Medina & E.B.Souza
- Mitracarpus bahorucanus Zanoni
- Mitracarpus baturitensis Sucre
- Mitracarpus bicrucis Bacigalupo & E.L.Cabral
- Mitracarpus brachystigma Urb.
- Mitracarpus brasiliensis M.L.Porto & J.L.Wächt.
- Mitracarpus breviflorus A.Gray
- Mitracarpus brevis K.Schum. & R.Fr.
- Mitracarpus buiquensis E.B.Souza & Zappi
- Mitracarpus capitatus Lozada-Pérez & Borhidi
- Mitracarpus carajasensis E.L.Cabral, Sobrado & E.B.Souza
- Mitracarpus carnosus Borhidi & Lozada-Pérez
- Mitracarpus christii Urb.
- Mitracarpus decumbens Urb.
- Mitracarpus depauperatus Britton & P.Wilson
- Mitracarpus diversifolius E.B.Souza & E.L.Cabral
- Mitracarpus eichleri K.Schum.
- Mitracarpus eitenii E.B.Souza & E.L.Cabral
- Mitracarpus eritrichoides Standl.
- Mitracarpus falcatus Lozada-Pérez & Borhidi
- Mitracarpus federalensis E.L.Cabral, Sobrado & E.B.Souza
- Mitracarpus fernandesii E.L.Cabral, Sobrado & E.B.Souza
- Mitracarpus filipes Huber
- Mitracarpus fischeri (Link) Cham. & Schltdl. ex DC.
- Mitracarpus flagellatus Sucre
- Mitracarpus floribundus Borhidi & Lozada-Pérez
- Mitracarpus fortunii Britton & P.Wilson
- Mitracarpus frigidus (Willd.) K.Schum.
- Mitracarpus froesii (Sucre) E.L.Cabral & E.B.Souza
- Mitracarpus glabrescens (Griseb.) Urb.
- Mitracarpus gypsophilus Borhidi & E.Martínez
- Mitracarpus haitiensis Urb.
- Mitracarpus hasslerianus Chodat
- Mitracarpus hirtus (L.) DC.
- Mitracarpus laeteviridis C.Wright
- Mitracarpus lhotzkyanus Cham.
- Mitracarpus linearifolius A.Rich.
- Mitracarpus linearis Benth.
- Mitracarpus longicalyx E.B.Souza & M.F.Sales
- Mitracarpus maxwelliae Britton & P.Wilson
- Mitracarpus megapotamicus (Spreng.) Kuntze
- Mitracarpus micranthus Borhidi & E.Martínez
- Mitracarpus microspermus K.Schum.
- Mitracarpus nitidus E.B.Souza & Zappi
- Mitracarpus parvulus K.Schum.
- Mitracarpus polycladus Urb.
- Mitracarpus polygonifolius (A.St.-Hil.) R.M.Salas & E.B.Souza
- Mitracarpus portoricensis (Urb.) Urb.
- Mitracarpus pusillus Steyerm.
- Mitracarpus recurvatus Standl.
- Mitracarpus rigidifolius Standl.
- Mitracarpus rizzinianus Machado
- Mitracarpus robustus E.B.Souza & E.L.Cabral
- Mitracarpus sagranus DC.
- Mitracarpus salzmannianus DC.
- Mitracarpus scaberulus Urb.
- Mitracarpus schininianus E.L.Cabral, W.A.Medina & E.B.Souza
- Mitracarpus schizangius DC.
- Mitracarpus semirianus J.A.M.Carmo & Scatigna
- Mitracarpus squarrosus (Poepp. ex Cham. & Schltdl.) Cham. & Schltdl. ex DC.
- Mitracarpus steyermarkii E.L.Cabral & Bacigalupo
- Mitracarpus tenuis Urb.
- Mitracarpus trichanthus Borhidi & Lozada-Pérez
