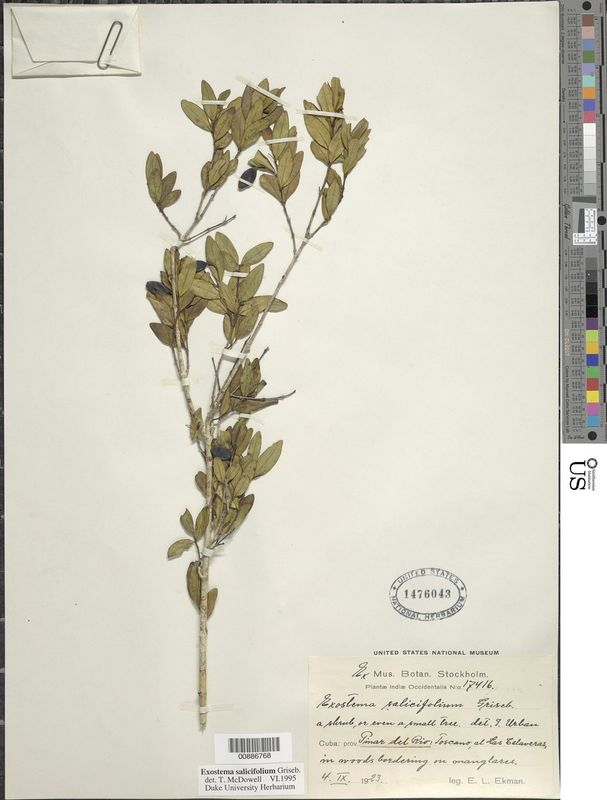

Conservation status
- Critically Endangered (IUCN 3.1)

Scientific classification
- Kingdom: Plantae
- Clade: Embryophytes
- Clade: Tracheophytes
- Clade: Angiosperms
- Clade: Eudicots
- Clade: Asterids
- Order: Gentianales
- Family: Rubiaceae
- Genus: Exostema
- Species: E. salicifolium

Binomial name
- Exostema salicifolium Griseb.

= Exostema salicifolium =

Species of flowering plant

Exostema salicifolium is a species of flowering plant in the family Rubiaceae. It is a shrub or tree with subleathery leaves, a purplish corolla, and capsule fruits. The species is native to Cuba.

Exostema salicifolium is native to Cuba, and is listed as Critically Endangered by the IUCN.

== Taxonomy ==
The species was described by August Grisebach in 1866. The type locality is in western Cuba.

== Distribution ==
Exostema salicifolium is native to the wet tropical biome of Cuba. It has only been reported from a single location.

== Description ==
Exostema salicifolium is a shrub or tree. It grows to around 3 metres (9.8 ft) high. The branches are slender and greyish.

The leaves are up to 1.5 millimetres (0.059 in) long. The leaves are subleathery, oblong-oblanceolate or narrowly elliptical-oblong, 3–4 centimetres (1.2–1.6 in) long, and 0.7–1.1 centimetres (0.28–0.43 in) wide.

The flowers are solitary, and grow on 1–1.8 centimetres (0.39–0.71 in) stems. The hypanthium is oval-elliptic, and 3–4 millimetres (0.12–0.16 in) long. The calyx has minute lobes. The corolla is purplish on the outside, and white on the inside. The corolla tube is around 2 centimetres (0.79 in) long, and has five lobes.

The fruit is an ellipsoid capsule, measuring 1.2–1.8 centimetres (0.47–0.71 in) long.

== Conservation ==
In 2022, the IUCN assessed Exostema salicifolium as Critically Endangered. It may be extinct.
