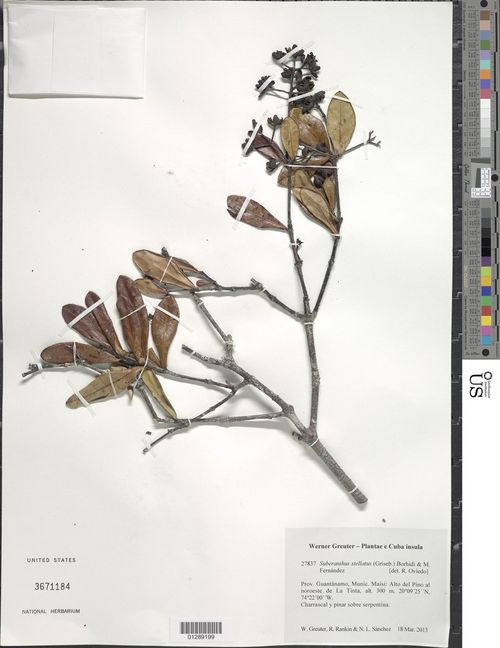

Scientific classification
- Kingdom: Plantae
- Clade: Tracheophytes
- Clade: Angiosperms
- Clade: Eudicots
- Clade: Asterids
- Order: Gentianales
- Family: Rubiaceae
- Genus: Suberanthus
- Species: S. stellatus

Binomial name
- Suberanthus stellatus (Griseb.) Borhidi & M.Fernández

Synonyms
- Ferdinandea stellata Griseb.; Rondeletia stellata (Griseb.) C.Wright

= Suberanthus stellatus =

Species of flowering plant

Suberanthus stellatus is a species of flowering plant in the family Rubiaceae. The species is a shrub native to Cuba. It was first described in 1862.

== Distribution ==
Suberanthus stellatus is native to the seasonally dry tropical biome and mountains of Cuba. The type locality is in the pine lands of eastern Cuba.

== Taxonomy ==
Suberanthus stellatus was originally described as Ferdinandea stellata in 1862, by August Grisebach. In 1869, Charles Wright renamed it to Rondeletia stellata. It was described under its current name in 1982.

== Description ==
Suberanthus stellatus is a shrub. The plants are hairless. The branches are stout, and greyish-brown.

The leaves are thick and leathery. They are oblong, or widest above the centre. Leaves are 4.5–8.5 centimetres (1.8–3.3 in) in length, and 1.8–4 centimetres (0.71–1.57 in) in width. The leaf stems are 0.2–1.4 centimetres (0.079–0.551 in) long, and form a prominent midrib in the leaf.

The inflorescences grow on 2–5 centimetres (0.79–1.97 in) stalks. Each inflorescence has a few flowers, which grow on 0.5–1 centimetre (0.20–0.39 in) stalks. The seeds are brown, 2.4–5 millimetres (0.094–0.197 in) long, and have narrow wings.
