= Julián Acuña Galé =

Cuban botanist (1900–1973)

Julián Baldomero Acuña Galé
- Born: 27 February 1900; Camagüey, Cuba
- Died: 24 July 1973 (aged 73); Mexico City, Mexico
- Scientific career
- Fields: Plant pathology

Julián Baldomero Acuña Galé (27 February 1900 – 24 July 1973) was a Cuban-born botanist who served as director of the Agricultural Experimental Station in Santiago de Las Vegas. His research centered on phytopathology and on introduction of new, improved varieties of food and forage plants while his field work produced numerous herbarium collections; among them, many new species he described, or were named for him.

Acuña Galé was born in Camagüey, Cuba, and died in Mexico City, Mexico.

In 1980, Acunaeanthus was published, which is a genus of flowering plants in the family of Rubiaceae. The genus which is endemic to Cuba was named in honour of Julián Acuña Galé.

== Bibliography ==
- WorldCat
