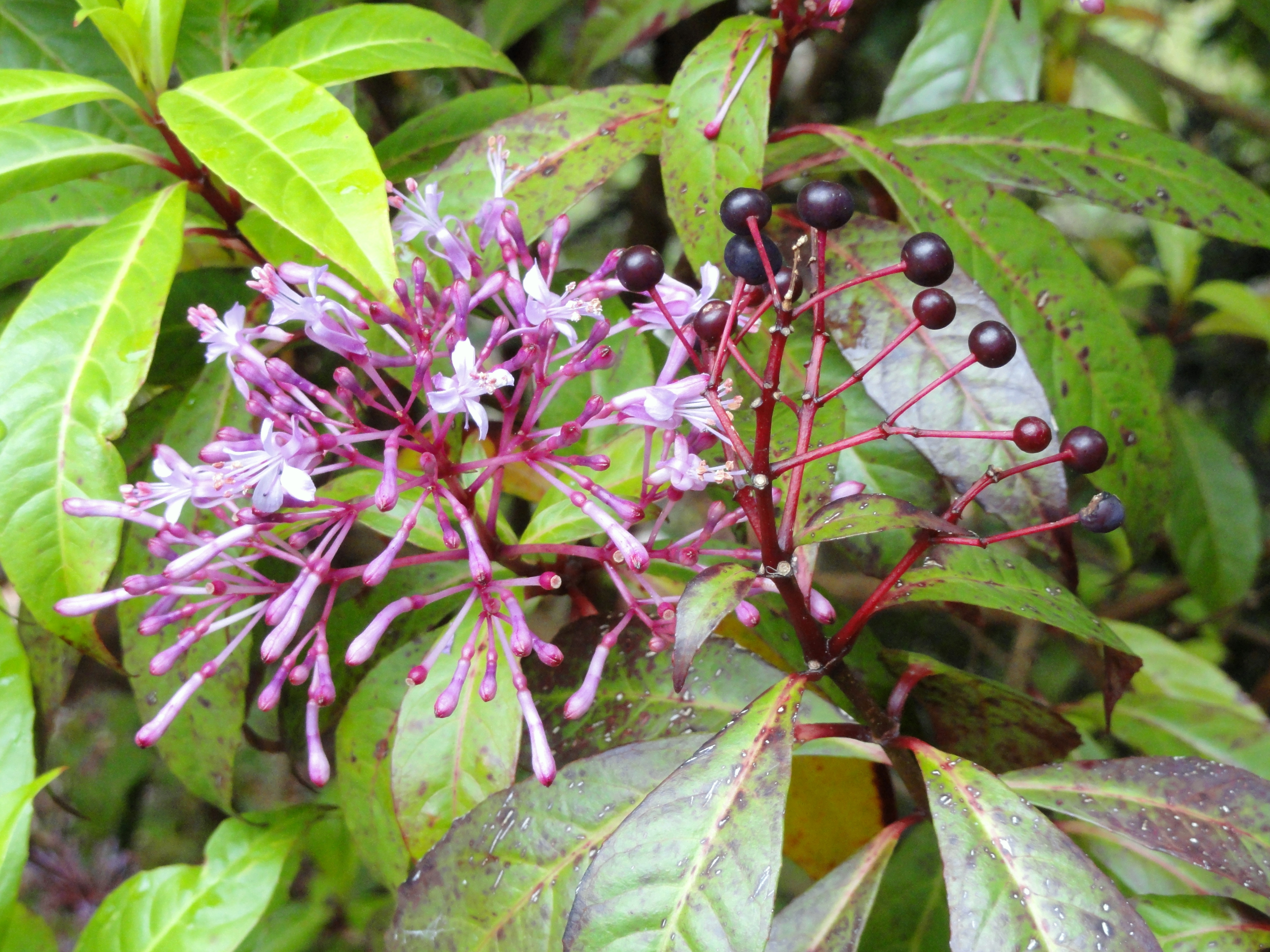

Scientific classification
- Kingdom: Plantae
- Clade: Embryophytes
- Clade: Tracheophytes
- Clade: Spermatophytes
- Clade: Angiosperms
- Clade: Eudicots
- Clade: Asterids
- Order: Gentianales
- Family: Rubiaceae
- Genus: Rovaeanthus
- Species: R. strigosus

Binomial name
- Rovaeanthus strigosus (Benth.) Borhidi

Synonyms
- Bouvardia strigosa Benth.; Rogiera strigosa (Benth.) Borhidi; Rondeletia strigosa (Benth.) Hemsl.

= Rovaeanthus strigosus =

Species of flowering plant

Rovaeanthus strigosus is a species of flowering plant in the family Rubiaceae. It was first described in 1841, and given its current name in 2004. It is native to Mexico and central America.

Rovaeanthus strigosus is a shrub that grows up to 2 metres (6.6 ft) high. It has 3–5 centimetres (1.2–2.0 in) long inflorescences.

== Taxonomy ==
George Bentham described Rovaeanthus strigosus in 1841, as Bouvardia strigosa. In 1879, William Hemsley moved it to the genus Rondeletia. In 1982, Attila Borhidi moved the species to the genus Rogiera. Borhidi gave the species its current name in 2004.

== Distribution ==
The species is native to the subtropical biome of Mexico and central America (El Salvador, Guatemala, Honduras, and Nicaragua). Within Mexico, it is present in the states of Veracruz, Oaxaca, and Chiapas).

== Description ==
Rovaeanthus strigosus is a scrambling shrub or subshrub that grows up to 2 metres (6.6 ft) high. The leaves are 1.5–5 centimetres (0.59–1.97 in) long, 0.8–2.8 centimetres (0.31–1.10 in) wide, and generally ovate, narrowly ovate, or ovate-elliptical. They are leathery when dry.

The inflorescences measure 3–5 centimetres (1.2–2.0 in), and have one to five flowers each.
