= Roigella =

Scientific classification
- Kingdom: Plantae
- Clade: Tracheophytes
- Clade: Angiosperms
- Clade: Eudicots
- Clade: Asterids
- Order: Gentianales
- Family: Rubiaceae
- Genus: Roigella; Borhidi & M.Fernández
- Species: R. correifolia

Binomial name
- Roigella correifolia (Griseb.) Borhidi & M.Fernández

Synonyms
- Rondeletia correifolia Griseb.

Species of plants

Roigella is a monotypic genus of flowering plants belonging to the family Rubiaceae. It only contains one known species, Roigella correifolia.

It is native to Cuba. It is found in pineland habitats.

The genus name of Roigella is in honour of Juan Tomás Roig (1877–1971), a Cuban teacher and botanist in Havana. It is not known what the Latin specific epithet of correifolia means. Both the genus and the species were first described and published in Acta Bot. Acad. Sci. Hung. Vol.27 on page 310 (1981, published in 1982).
