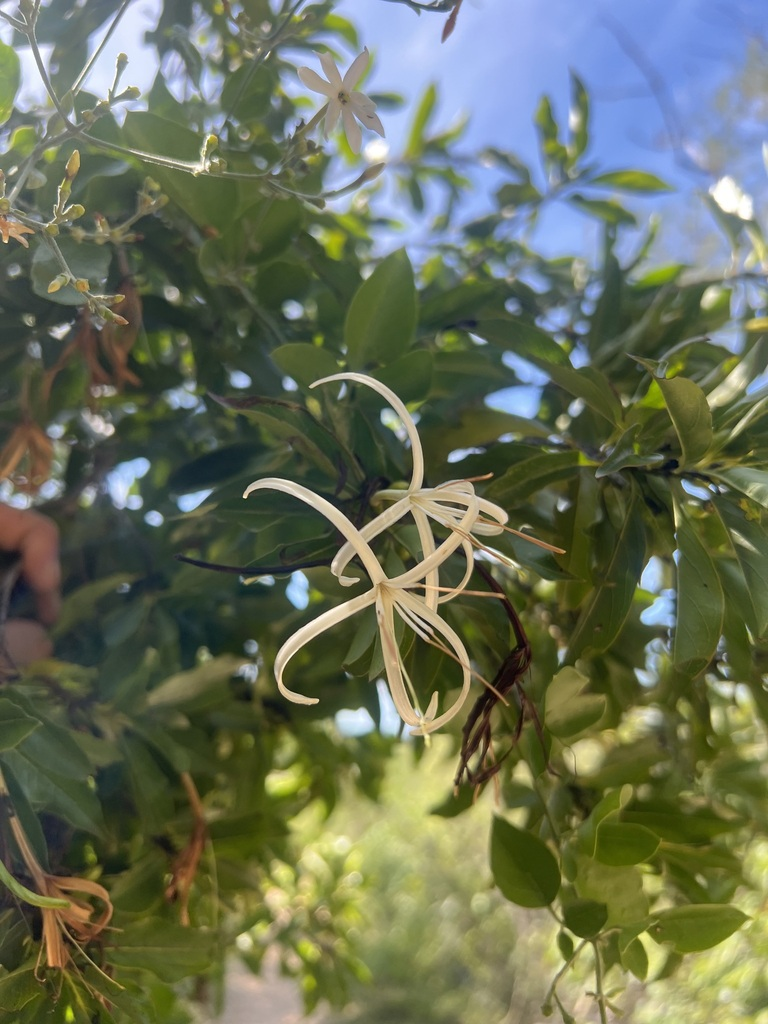

Conservation status
- Least Concern (IUCN 3.1)

- Secure (NatureServe)

Scientific classification
- Kingdom: Plantae
- Clade: Embryophytes
- Clade: Tracheophytes
- Clade: Spermatophytes
- Clade: Angiosperms
- Clade: Eudicots
- Clade: Asterids
- Order: Gentianales
- Family: Rubiaceae
- Genus: Exostema
- Species: E. caribaeum

Binomial name
- Exostema caribaeum (Jacq.) Roem. & Schult.

Synonyms
- Cinchona caribaea Jacq.; Cinchona myrtifolia Stokes; Cinchona caribbeana W.Wright; Cinchona herbacea L.; Cinchona jamaicensis Wright; Cinchona racemosa Schrank ex Steud.; Exostema caribaeum var. pubescens Borhidi & O.Muñiz; Exostema caribaeum var. velutinum Urb.; Exostema longicuspe Oerst.; Exostema veraensis Kitanov

= Exostema caribaeum =

Species of flowering plant

Exostema caribaeum, commonly known as princewood, Caribbean princewood, or Jesuit bark, is a species of flowering plant in the family Rubiaceae. It is a shrub or tree with papery leaves, white flowers, and brown capsule fruits.

Exostema caribaeum is native to forests in the United States, the Caribbean, and central America. The species was described in 1760. In 2018, the IUCN listed it as of Least Concern. It is used for medicine, timber, and horticulture.

== Taxonomy ==
The species was named in 1760, by Nikolaus Joseph von Jacquin. Jacquin placed it in the genus Cinchona. In 1819, Johann Jacob Roemer and Josef August Schultes moved it to the genus Exostema.

== Distribution ==
The species is native to the wet tropical biome of the United States (southern Florida), the Caribbean, Mexico, and central America. It grows in arid coastal thickets, dry forests, and pine woodlands. The species grows on solid limestone.

Its extimated extent of occurrence is 5,328,368.99 square kilometres (2,057,294.77 sq mi). The species is present at elevations up to 800 feet (240 m).

== Description ==
Exostema caribaeum is a perennial shrub or tree that grows 2–4 metres (6.6–13.1 ft) high. The bark is smooth, developing horizontal fissures with age, and greyish or dark brown. The twigs are slightly flattened.

The leaves are papery, elliptic to elliptic-ovate, 3.5–7.5 centimetres (1.4–3.0 in) long, and 1.7–3 centimetres (0.67–1.18 in) wide. The edges are slightly undulating. The leaves are arranged oppositely, and have 3–12 millimetres (0.12–0.47 in) long stems.

The flowers are fragrant, solitary, and grow on 7–10 millimetres (0.28–0.39 in) stems. The calyx and corolla are fused into a hypanthium, which is green, bell-shaped, and 5–6 millimetres (0.20–0.24 in) long. The hypanthium has five triangular sepals, which are around 1 millimetre (0.039 in) long. The corolla is approximately trumpet-shaped, white to cream coloured, and forms a five-lobed cylindrical tube, which is 3–4 centimetres (1.2–1.6 in) long. The flowers have five stamens.

The fruit is a dark brown, ellipsoid capsule, measuring 1.3–1.7 centimetres (0.51–0.67 in) long. The capsule is dehiscent, splitting longitudinally. The seeds are around 4.5 millimetres (0.18 in) long, and lens-shaped.

== Ecology ==
Exostema caribaeum is a host of the fungus Meliola psychotriae.

== Conservation ==
In 2018, the IUCN assessed Exostema caribaeum as of Least Concern. The species faces no major threats, and has a stable population.

NatureServe lists the species as globally Secure, but Imperiled in Florida.

== Uses ==
In the Lucayan Archipelago, Exostema caribaeum is used to treat anemia, diarrhea, hemorrhoids, low blood pressure, stomach aches, and ringworm. Bark extracts are used to treat fever, and to increase intoxication from alcohol. The species is also used in strengthening teas, and to increase appetite.

The wood is used for fuel and timber. The timber is used for fences, cabinets, inlay, and woodturning.

Exostema caribaeum is used in the horticultural trade, due to its large, fragrant flowers.

== Nomenclature ==
English common names for the species are "Princewood", "Caribbean Princewood", or "Jesuit bark".

In Spanish, the species is known as cáscara sagrada roja or, in Dominican Spanish, as Piñí-piñí. In French, the species is known as Quinquina caraïbe. In Yucateco, the species is known as Sabak ché or Baak soots'.
