= Ignatz Urban =

German botanist (1848-1931)

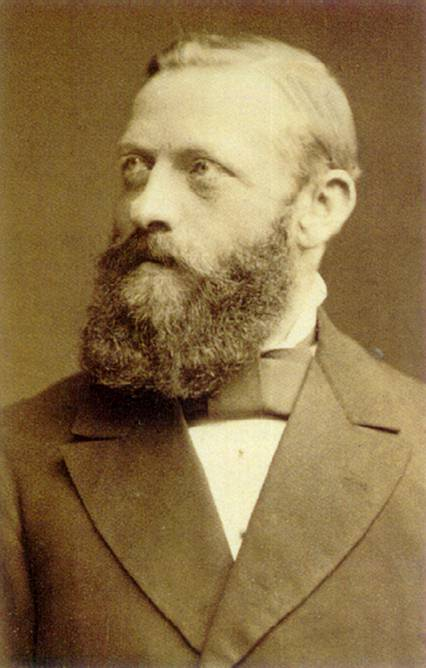
- Ignatz Urban in 1881
- Born: 7 January 1848; Warburg, Kingdom of Prussia
- Died: 7 January 1931 (aged 83); Berlin, Weimar Republic
- Education: University of Bonn, University of Berlin
- Scientific career
- Author abbrev. (botany): Urb.

Ignatz Urban (7 January 1848 – 7 January 1931) was a German botanist. He is known for his contributions to the flora of the Caribbean and Brazil, and for his work as curator of the Berlin Botanical Garden. Born the son of a brewer, Urban showed an interest in botany as an undergraduate. He pursued further study at the University of Bonn and later at the University of Berlin where he gained a doctorate in 1873. Urban was appointed by A. W. Eichler to run the Berlin Botanical Garden and supervised its move to Dahlem. He also worked as Eichler's assistant on the Flora Brasiliensis, later succeeding him as editor. In 1884 Urban began working with Leopold Krug on his Puerto Rican collections, a collaboration would later produce the nine-volume Symbolae Antillanae, one of his most important contributions, and his 30-part Sertum Antillanum. Urban's herbarium, estimated to include 80,000 or more sheets, was destroyed when the Berlin Herbarium was bombed in 1943, during the Second World War.

== Early life and education ==
Urban was born in Warburg, Province of Westphalia, in the Kingdom of Prussia in 1848 as the son of a prosperous brewer. He was educated at the local Gymnasium, and later in Paderborn before proceeding to the University of Bonn and then the University of Berlin. He served in the military between 1869 and 1871 (seeing action in the Franco-Prussian War) before returning to his studies. He received his doctorate in 1873 and took up a teaching position in Lichterfelde.

== Berlin Botanical Garden ==
In 1878 Eichler was appointed head of Botany at the University of Berlin. Eichler appointed Urban as assistant head of the Berlin Botanical Garden, and in 1883 he was promoted to the position of curator. As curator of the Garden, Urban supervised their transfer from their original site to their present site in Berlin-Dahlem.

== Flora of Brazil ==
Urban worked as Eichler's assistant in the production of the Flora Brasiliensis, which had been initiated by Carl Friedrich Philipp von Martius and Stephan Endlicher in 1840. Urban later took over as editor after Eichler's death, and saw the work through to its completion in 1906.

== Caribbean botany and Symbolae Antillanae ==
In 1884 Urban began working with Leopold Krug on his plant collections. Krug was a German businessman based in Puerto Rico who had developed an interest in biology. Together with his friend Domingo Bello y Espinosa, Krug had accumulated a large collection of plants and had done a series of illustrations and plates. Returning to Berlin in 1876, Krug had worked with botanist Friz Kurtz to attempt to identify his collections. When Bello published a portion of the work (which Krug had envisioned as a joint work), without reference to Krug's contributions, Krug was determined to publish his work. After Kurtz emigrated to Argentina in 1884, Krug collaborated with Urban.

Krug hired plant collector Paul Sintenis to work in Puerto Rico, especially in the mountainous areas where Krug and Bello had made few collections. Between 1884 and 1887 Sintenis made 8450 collections, the best of which were retained by Urban in Berlin. The remainder were sold as duplicated to other collections, and the proceeds used by Urban to fund further collections. With Krug's support Urban subsidised Henrik von Eggers collections, and later helped secure support for Erik Ekman's collections in Cuba and Hispaniola. He also exchanged material extensively with other botanists and distributed fragments of his type collections so widely. This became especially important after his original collections, estimated to consist of 80,000 sheets or more, were destroyed when the Berlin Herbarium was bombed in 1943, during World War II.

In 1886 Urban published his first paper primarily dedicated to Caribbean plants. In 1898 he began the publication of Symbolae Antillanae seu fundamenta Florae Indiae Occidentalis. In 1913 he retired, having produced seven volumes of Symbolae Antillanae. He then began work on Sertum Antillanum which eventually became a 30-part series, completed in 1930. Volume eight of Symbolae Antillanae was completed in 1921, and volume nine in 1928.

Urban continued working until a few weeks before his death in 1931, on the morning of his eighty-third birthday.

== Honours ==
He has been honoured in the naming of several plant taxa including;

- Urbanodendron by Carl Christian Mez in 1889, (in the family Lauraceae)
- Ignurbia by Bertil Nordenstam in 2006, (in the family Asteraceae)
