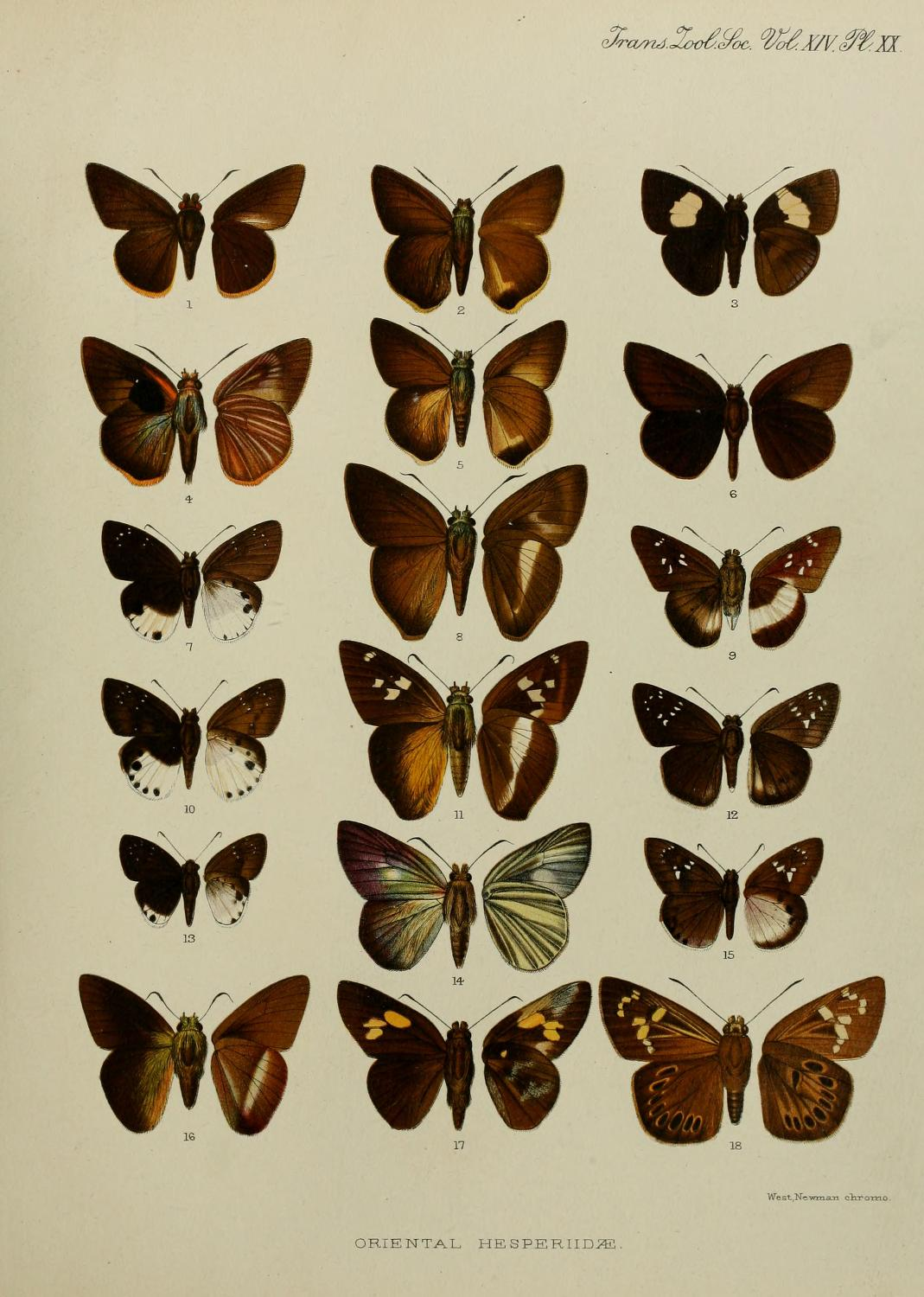
- Gangara sanguinocculus (figure 17)

Scientific classification
- Kingdom: Animalia
- Phylum: Arthropoda
- Class: Insecta
- Order: Lepidoptera
- Family: Hesperiidae
- Tribe: Erionotini
- Genus: Gangara; Moore, [1881]

= Gangara =

Genus of butterflies

Gangara is an Indomalayan genus of grass skippers in the family Hesperiidae.

== Species ==
- Gangara lebadea (Hewitson, 1886) - banded redeye
- Gangara thyrsis (Fabricius, 1775) - giant redeye
- Gangara sanguinocculus (Martin, 1895)Burma, Thailand, Malaysia, Borneo, Sumatra
- Gangara tumpa de Jong, 1992 Celebes

The larvae feed on Arecaceae, Musaceae, Philydraceae, Myrtaceae, Poaceae:- Calamus, Korthalsia, Arenga, Caryota, Cocos, Cyrtostachys, Elaeis, Eugeissona, Licuala, Livistona, Musa, Nypa, Philydrum, Psidium, Roystonea, Saccharum, Trachycarpus.
