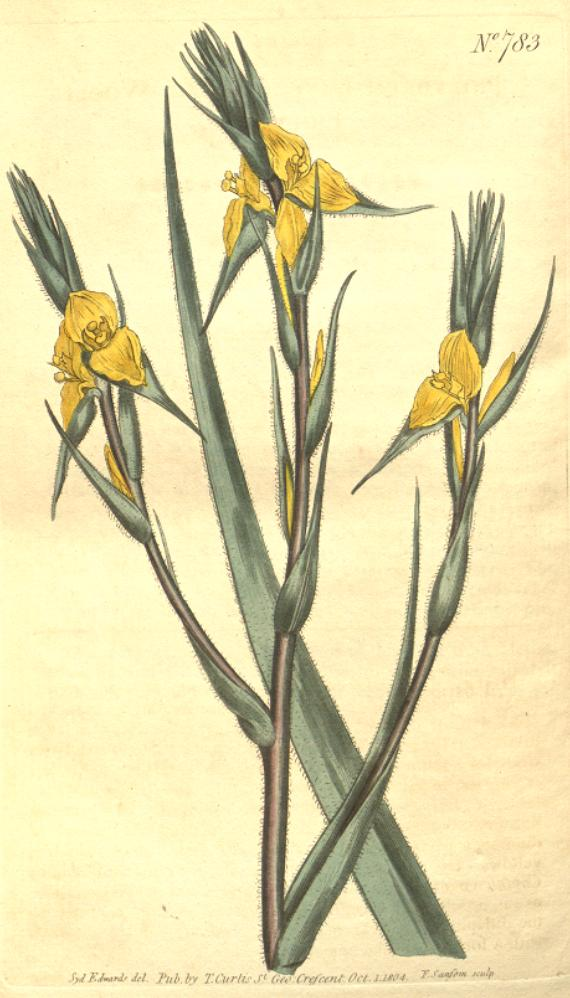
- Philydrum lanuginosum

Scientific classification
- Kingdom: Plantae
- Clade: Tracheophytes
- Clade: Angiosperms
- Clade: Monocots
- Clade: Commelinids
- Order: Commelinales
- Family: Philydraceae
- Genus: Philydrum; Banks & Sol. ex Gaertn.
- Species: P. lanuginosum

Binomial name
- Philydrum lanuginosum Banks ex Gaertn.

Synonyms
- Garciana Lour.; Garciana cochinchinensis Lour.

= Philydrum =

frogsmouths

Genus of flowering plants

Philydrum is a genus of tufted, herbaceous, aquatic macrophyte plants, one of three genera constituting the plant family Philydraceae.

Philydrum lanuginosum is the sole known species. They are commonly known as frogsmouths and woolly waterlilies.

Woolly waterlilies occur naturally across south and east Asia, including India, S. China, Taiwan, Japan, Malaysia, Burma, Thailand, Vietnam; across Malesia including New Guinea; across northern and eastern Australia and the Pacific Islands. In Australia they grow naturally in wetlands in northern WA, NT, Qld, NSW and Vic.

They have spongy, soft, hairy, herbaceous foliage. The foliage grows upright in tufts up to 80 cm (2.6 ft) high, from short–creeping and branching stems rooted in the mud. The stems grow up taller than the leaves, becoming green and woolly spikes up to 2 m (6.6 ft) high. The spikes successively open many, attractive, fine yellow flowers. Long, pointed, green and woolly bracts up to 7 cm (2.8 in) enclose each bud. As the spike grows, each successively mature bud's bract reflexes, opening the flower inside and subtending it, holding its delicate yellow 'petals' on display. Each flower has two, outer, showy yellow 'petals' (perianth segments), hairy on the outside and measuring up to 15 mm × 10 mm (0.6 in × 0.4 in). They look like open yellow mouths hence the common name frogsmouths. Within, the two inner, smaller, yellow 'petals' stand around the reproductive parts, of the single stamen and style.

Woolly waterlilies have some popularity in Australian wetland landscaping and gardening, but have yet to become very well known.

formerly included in genus

now in Helmholtzia

- P. glaberrimum - Helmholtzia glaberrima
- P. helmholtzii - Helmholtzia acorifolia

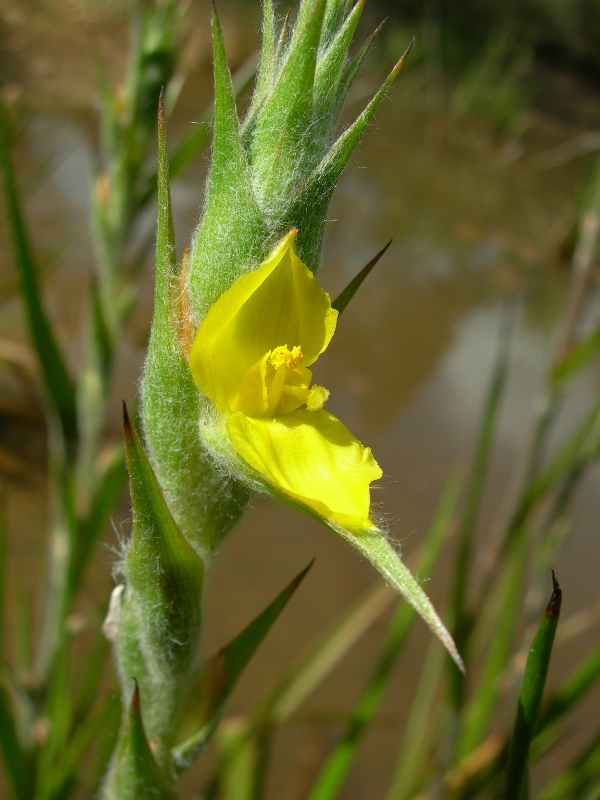
Flower on a spike. In small dam, Australia; by Shelle, 2 January 2009
