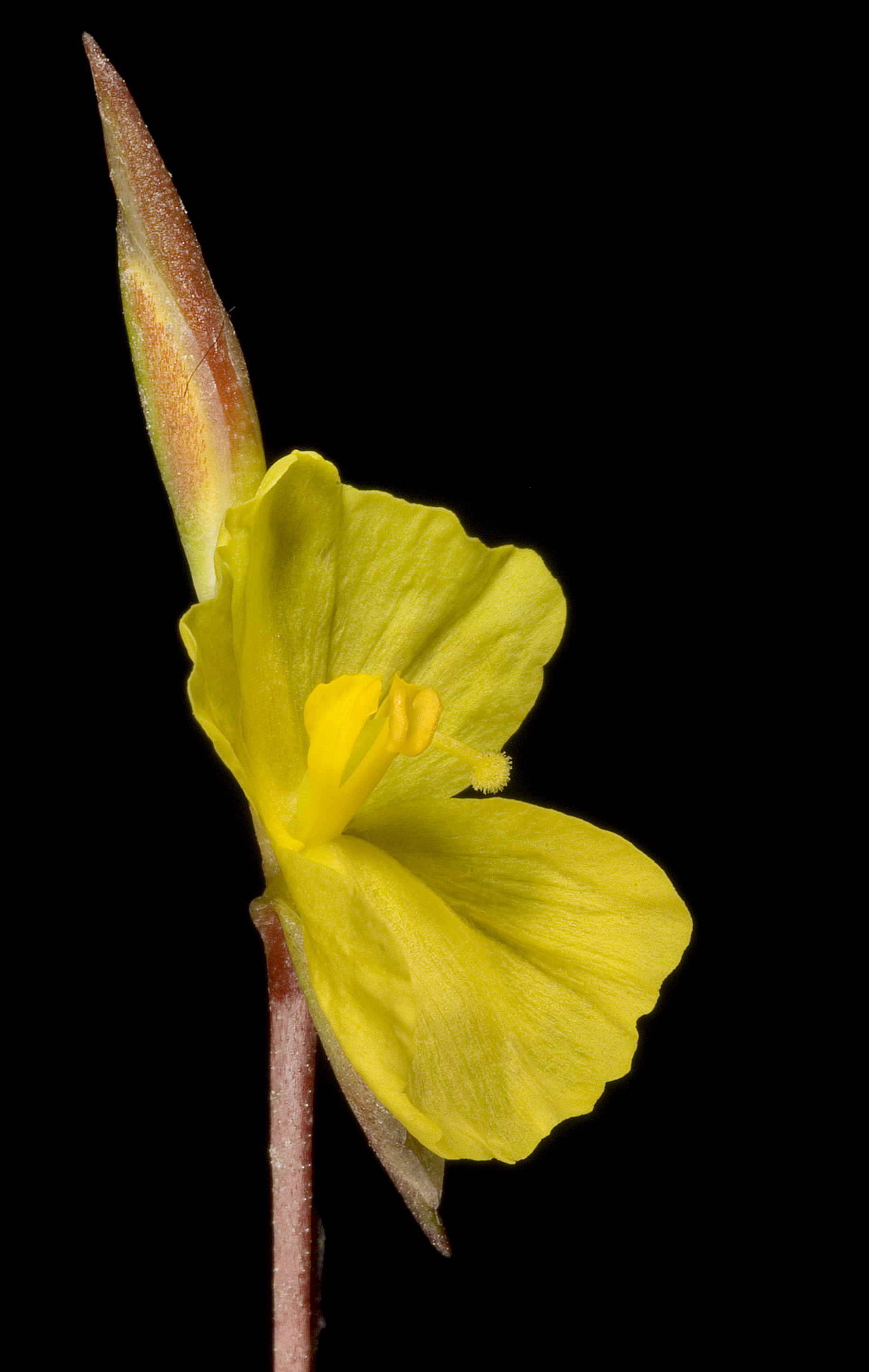

Scientific classification
- Kingdom: Plantae
- Clade: Tracheophytes
- Clade: Angiosperms
- Clade: Monocots
- Clade: Commelinids
- Order: Commelinales
- Family: Philydraceae
- Genus: Philydrella
- Species: P. pygmaea

Binomial name
- Philydrella pygmaea (R.Br.) Caruel

= Philydrella pygmaea =

Species of flowering plant

Philydrella pygmaea is a plant species in the Philydraceae family, first described by Robert Brown in 1810 as Philydrum pygmaeum, and transferred to the genus, Philydrella in 1878 by Teodoro Caruel.

It is endemic to the south-west of Western Australia.
