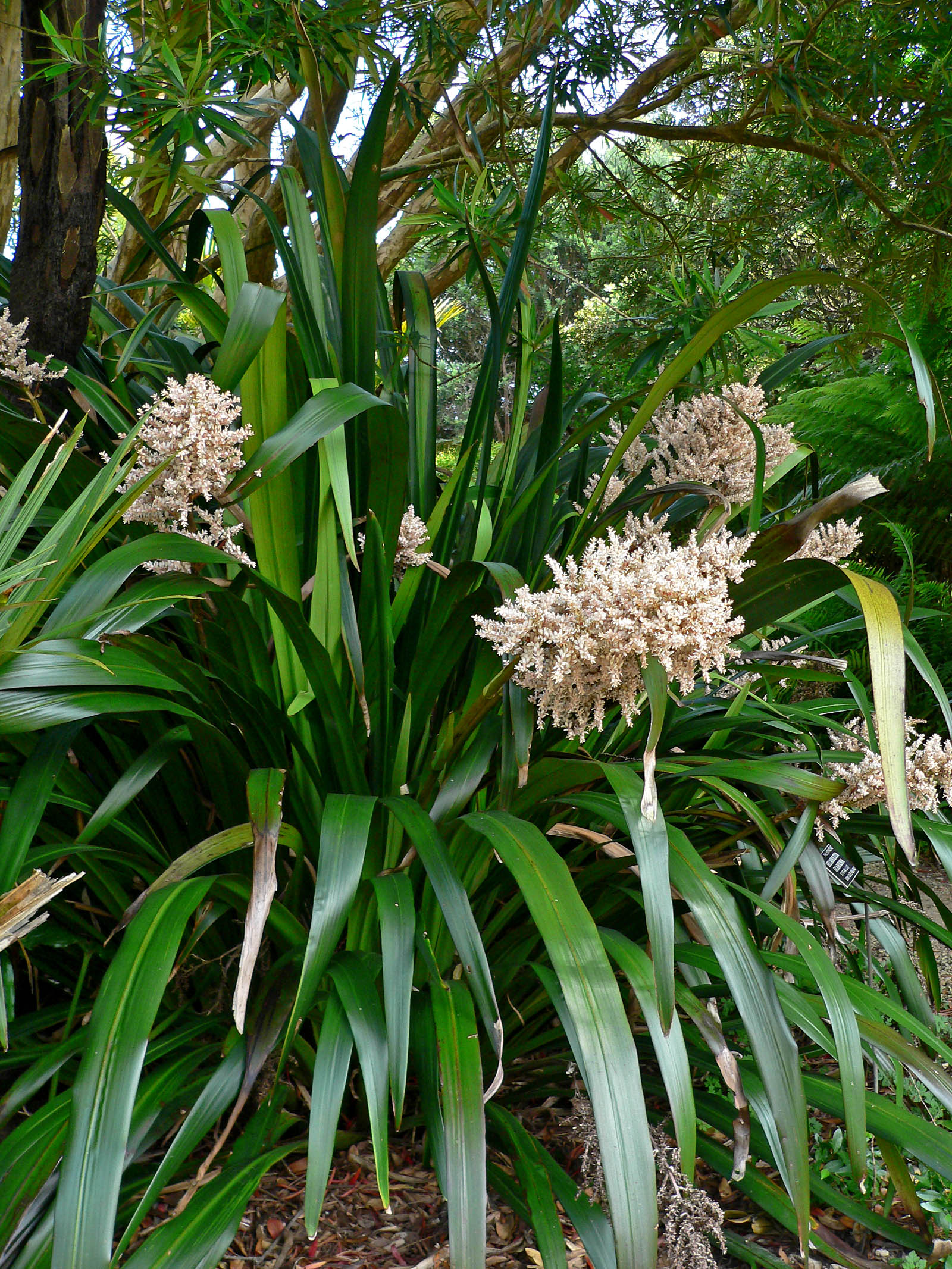

Conservation status
- Rare (NCA)

Scientific classification
- Kingdom: Plantae
- Clade: Tracheophytes
- Clade: Angiosperms
- Clade: Monocots
- Clade: Commelinids
- Order: Commelinales
- Family: Philydraceae
- Genus: Helmholtzia
- Species: H. glaberrima

Binomial name
- Helmholtzia glaberrima (Hook.f.) Caruel

= Helmholtzia glaberrima =

Stream lily

Species of flowering plant

Helmholtzia glaberrima, commonly referred to as stream lily, is a rhizomatous perennial plant which is native to New South Wales and Queensland in Australia.

Stream lilies have long, dark-green strap-like leaves and form clumps that are up to 2 metres high. The tall flower spikes, which appear in the summer, are white or pale pink.

They occur in and the McPherson Range and nearby areas of rainforest along creeks and gullies.

The species was first formally described by English botanist Joseph Dalton Hooker in The Botanical Magazine in 1873. He gave it the name Philydrum glaberrimum. The species was transferred to the genus Helmholtzia in 1881.
