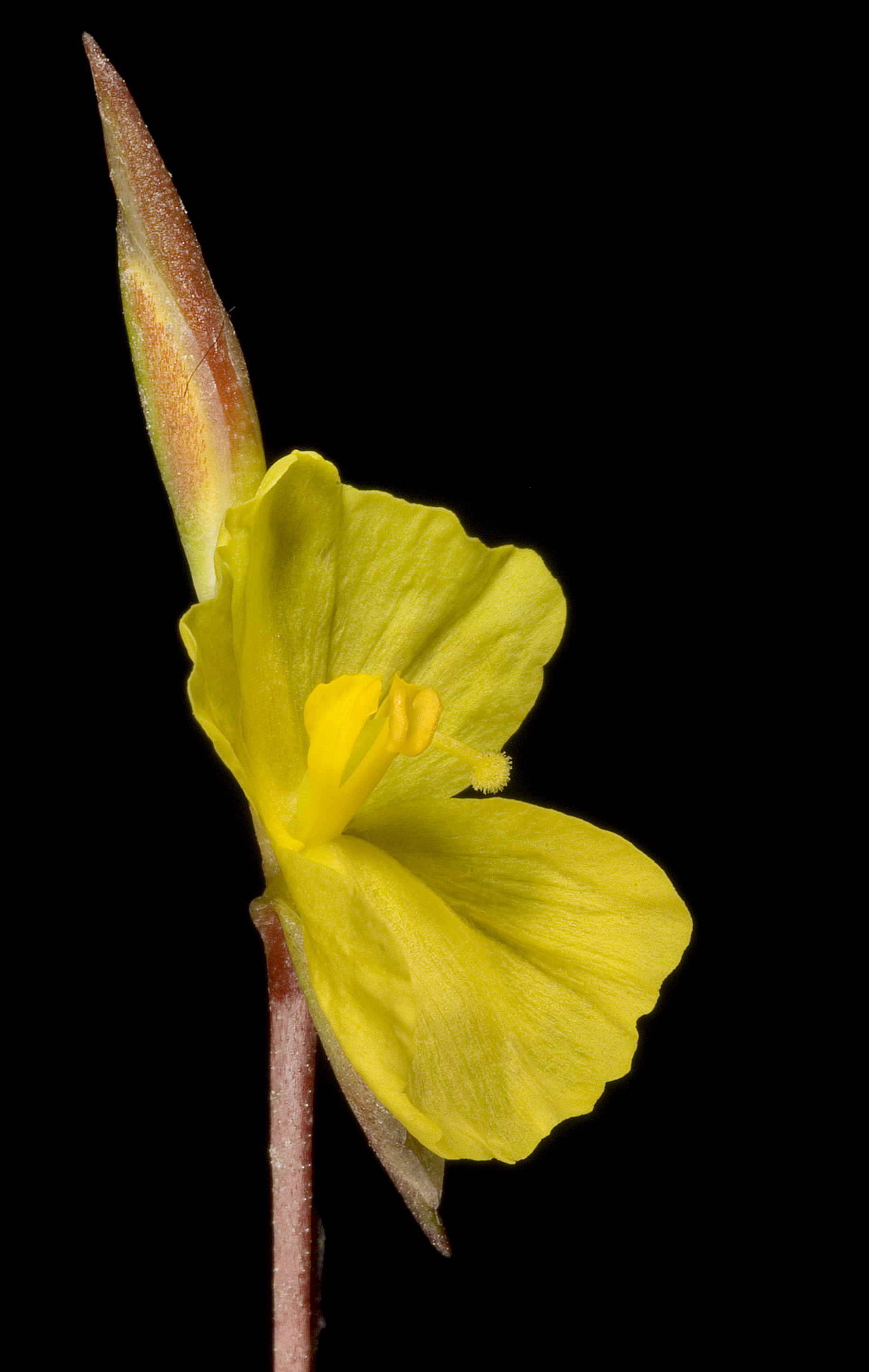
- Philydrella pygmaea

Scientific classification
- Kingdom: Plantae
- Clade: Tracheophytes
- Clade: Angiosperms
- Clade: Monocots
- Clade: Commelinids
- Order: Commelinales
- Family: Philydraceae
- Genus: Philydrella; Caruel

Synonyms
- Hetaeria Endl. 1836, illegitimate homonym, not Blume 1825 (Orchidaceae); Pritzelia F.Muell. 1875, illegitimate homonym, not Walp. 1843 (Araliaceae) nor Klotzsch 1854 (Begoniaceae) nor Schauer 1843 (Myrtaceae)

= Philydrella =

Genus of flowering plants

Philydrella is a small genus of flowering plants described as a genus with this name in 1878.

The entire genus is endemic to the southwestern portion of Western Australia.

Species

- Philydrella drummondii L.G.Adams
- Philydrella pygmaea (R.Br.) Caruel
