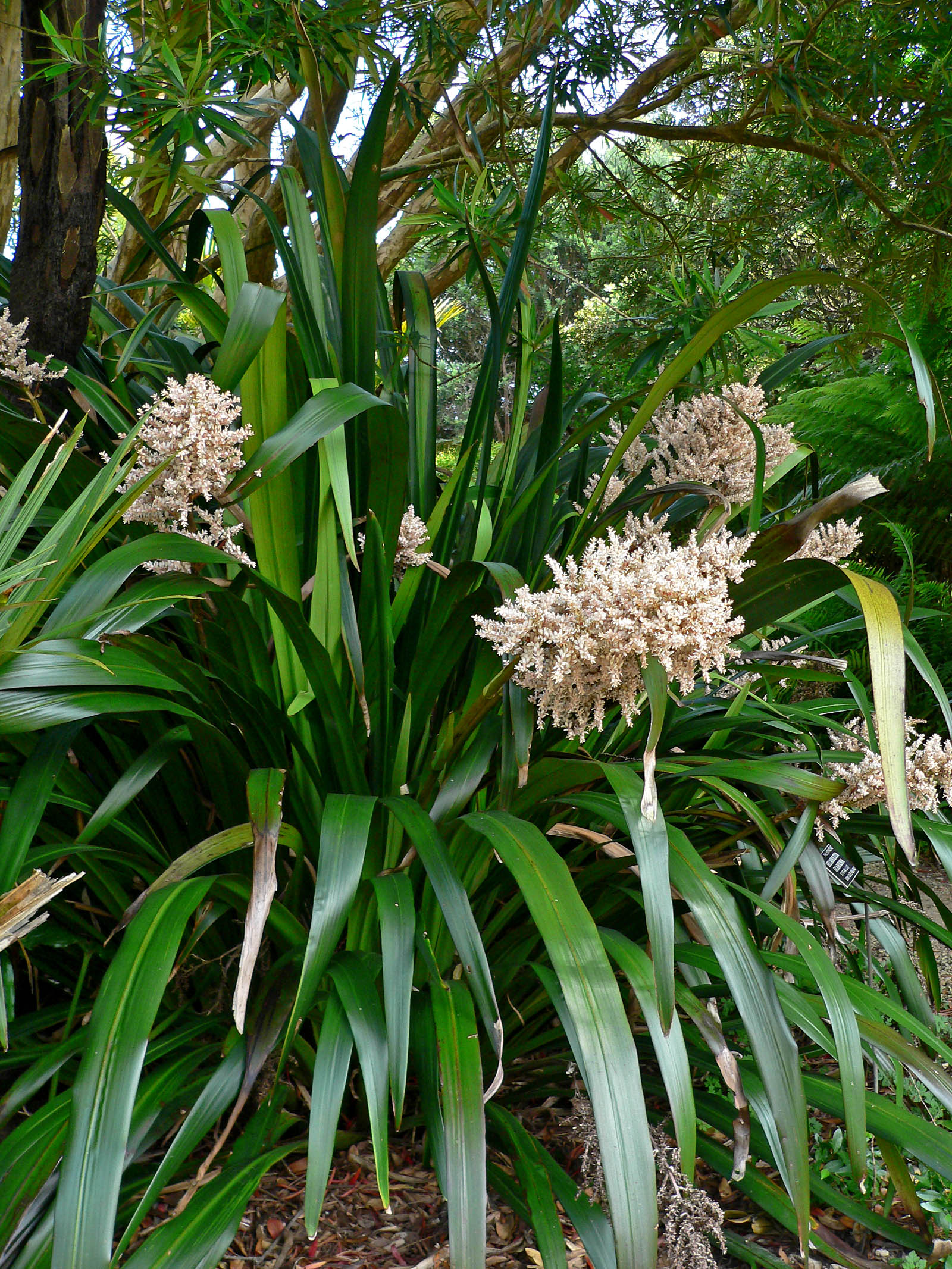
- Helmholtzia glaberrima

Scientific classification
- Kingdom: Plantae
- Clade: Tracheophytes
- Clade: Angiosperms
- Clade: Monocots
- Clade: Commelinids
- Order: Commelinales
- Family: Philydraceae
- Genus: Helmholtzia; F.Muell.

Synonyms
- Orthothylax (Hook.f.) Skottsb.; Philydrum section Helmholtzia (F.Muell.) Baill.; Philydrum section Orthothylax Hook. f.

= Helmholtzia =

Genus of flowering plants

Helmholtzia is a small genus of flowering plants described in 1866. It includes species native to Australia (New South Wales and Queensland), Indonesia (Maluku Province), and New Guinea.

The genus was named for Hermann von Helmholtz, a German physician and physicist, by botanist Ferdinand von Mueller.

Species

- Helmholtzia acorifolia F.Muell. - NE Queensland
- Helmholtzia glaberrima (Hook.f.) Caruel - Mount Warning region in SE Queensland + NE New South Wales
- Helmholtzia novoguineensis (K.Krause) Skottsb. - New Guinea, Maluku
