= Cyrtostachys elegans =

Scientific classification
- Kingdom: Plantae
- Clade: Tracheophytes
- Clade: Angiosperms
- Clade: Monocots
- Clade: Commelinids
- Order: Arecales
- Family: Arecaceae
- Genus: Cyrtostachys
- Species: C. elegans

Binomial name
- Cyrtostachys elegans Burret

Species of palm

Cyrtostachys elegans is a flowering plant species in the genus Cyrtostachys. It is endemic to New Guinea.
