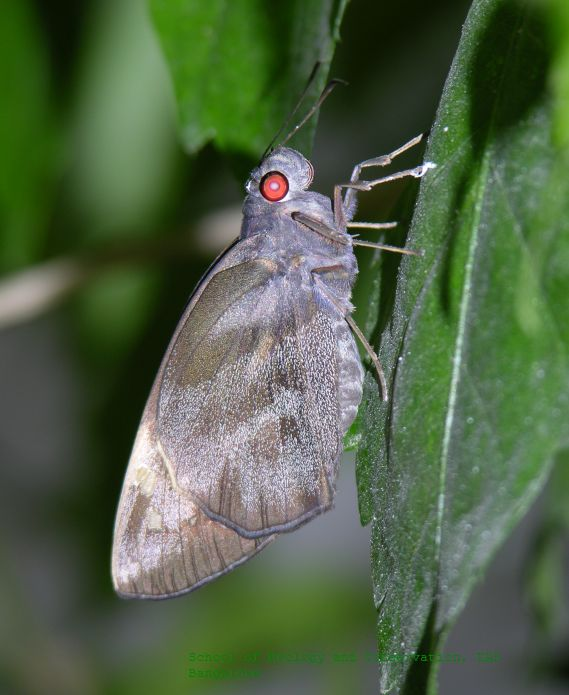

Scientific classification
- Kingdom: Animalia
- Phylum: Arthropoda
- Clade: Pancrustacea
- Class: Insecta
- Order: Lepidoptera
- Family: Hesperiidae
- Genus: Gangara
- Species: G. thyrsis

Binomial name
- Gangara thyrsis (Fabricius, 1775)

= Gangara thyrsis =

Giant redeye

Species of butterfly

Gangara thyrsis, commonly known as the giant redeye, is a species of butterfly belonging to the family Hesperiidae. It breeds on a number of palm species.

== Description ==
The male and female are dark chocolate brown. With a forewing consisting of bright yellow semi-transparent quadrate spots disposed triangularly, the first is large and occupying half the cell, the second also large, obliquely beneath and partly beyond, the third small and obliquely above the second; above the last are three smaller spots obliquely before the apex, the two upper being geminated; in some specimens beneath the subapical spots is a small dot, and on the posterior margin another, both similar to the rest; cilia at posterior angle brownish-white; hindwing with the cilia at the anterior angle brownish white. Underside, forewing irrorated (sprinkled) with grey scales near the apex, posterior margin pale brownish-white, spots yellow as above; hindwing irrorated with grey scales in a series of bands across the wing.

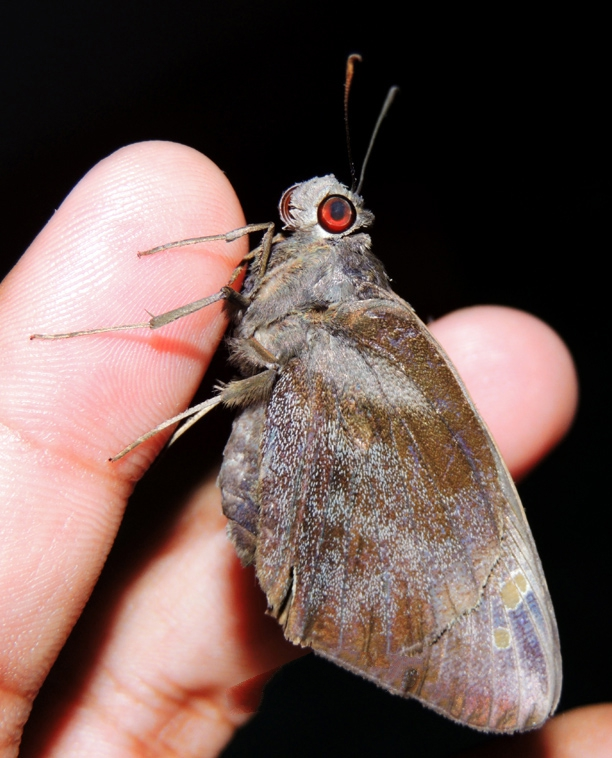
Giant redeye at Mangaon, Maharashtra

The male of this species presents, on the upperside of each anterior wing, three lines of modified scales, namely, one along the posterior side of the median vein between the origins of its first and second branches, another on each side of the first median veinlet from the origin of this up to the second discal spot, and a third, also double, along an equal portion of the submedian vein, and a thick clothing of setae paler than the groundcolour at the base of the interno-median area, and a similar clothing of paler setae on the middle three-fourths of the sutural area; and, on the underside, a conspicuous and equally long furry patch of pale fulvous coarse setae divided by the submedian vein.

The wing expanse ranges from 2.5 to 3.25 inches (64 to 83 mm).

== Distribution and habitat ==
It is found in Sri Lanka and India.

== Life cycle ==
The larva is greyish-white with a few ochreous dorsal spots and marks. From the body, a loose shaggy filamentous clothing consisting of pure wax is excreted, but which is easily rubbed off when handled, leaving the larva quite naked.

=== Food plants ===
The larvae feed on palms and canes including Cocos nucifera, Calamus pseudotenuis, Calamus rotang, Calamus thwaitesii, Phoenix loureirii, Licuala chinensis and Phoenix humilis. Has also been recorded on Zingiber officinale.

A number of wasps and flies are known to be parasitoids on the giant redeye. Some of the known wasps are Agiommatus thyrsisae, Anastatus ramakrishnai,Sympiesis thyrsisae, Brachymeria lasus and Sympiesis thyrsisae. Some of the known flies are Exorista sorbillans and Blepharella spp.

== Gallery ==
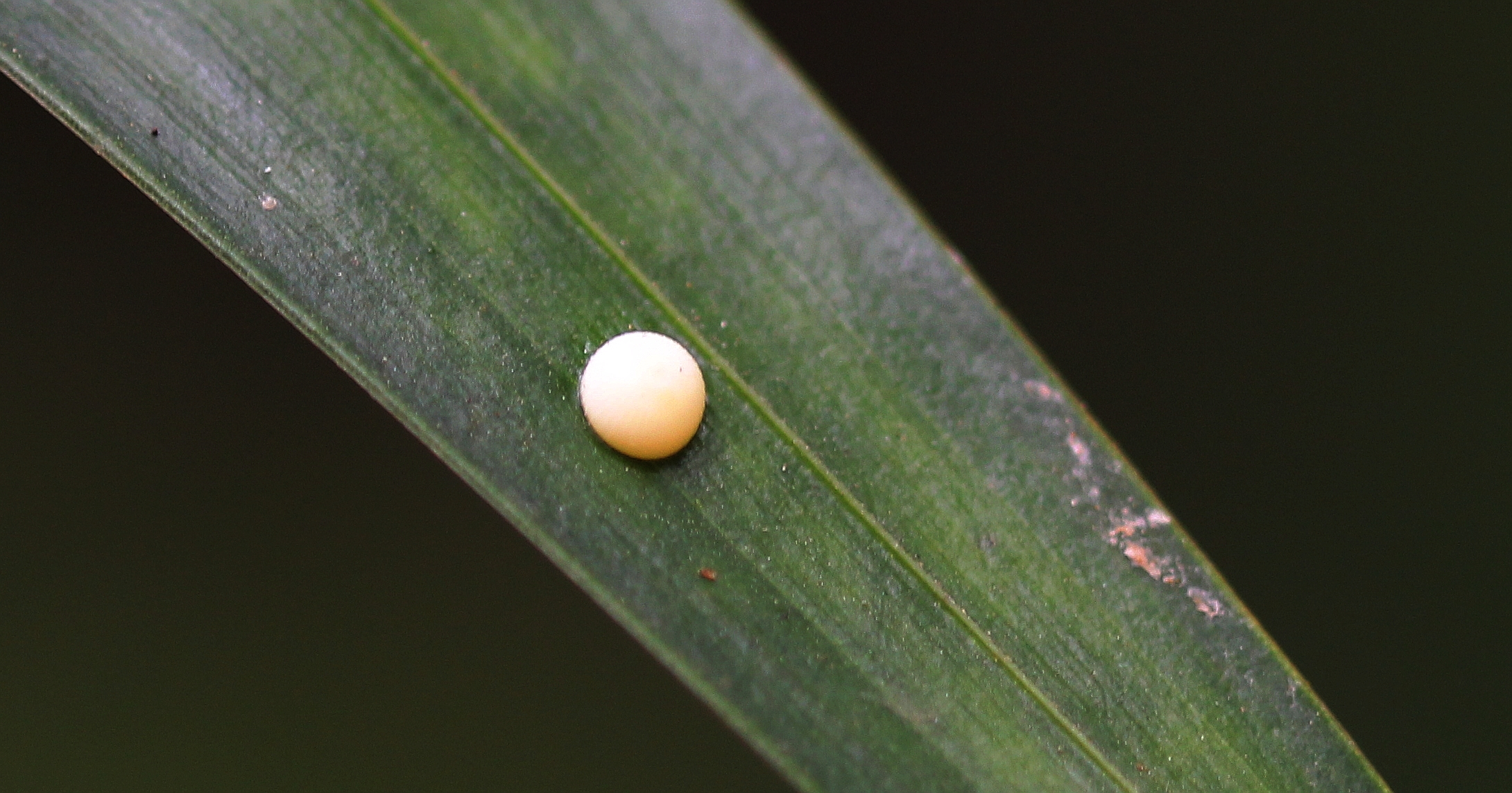
Egg of the giant redeye butterfly

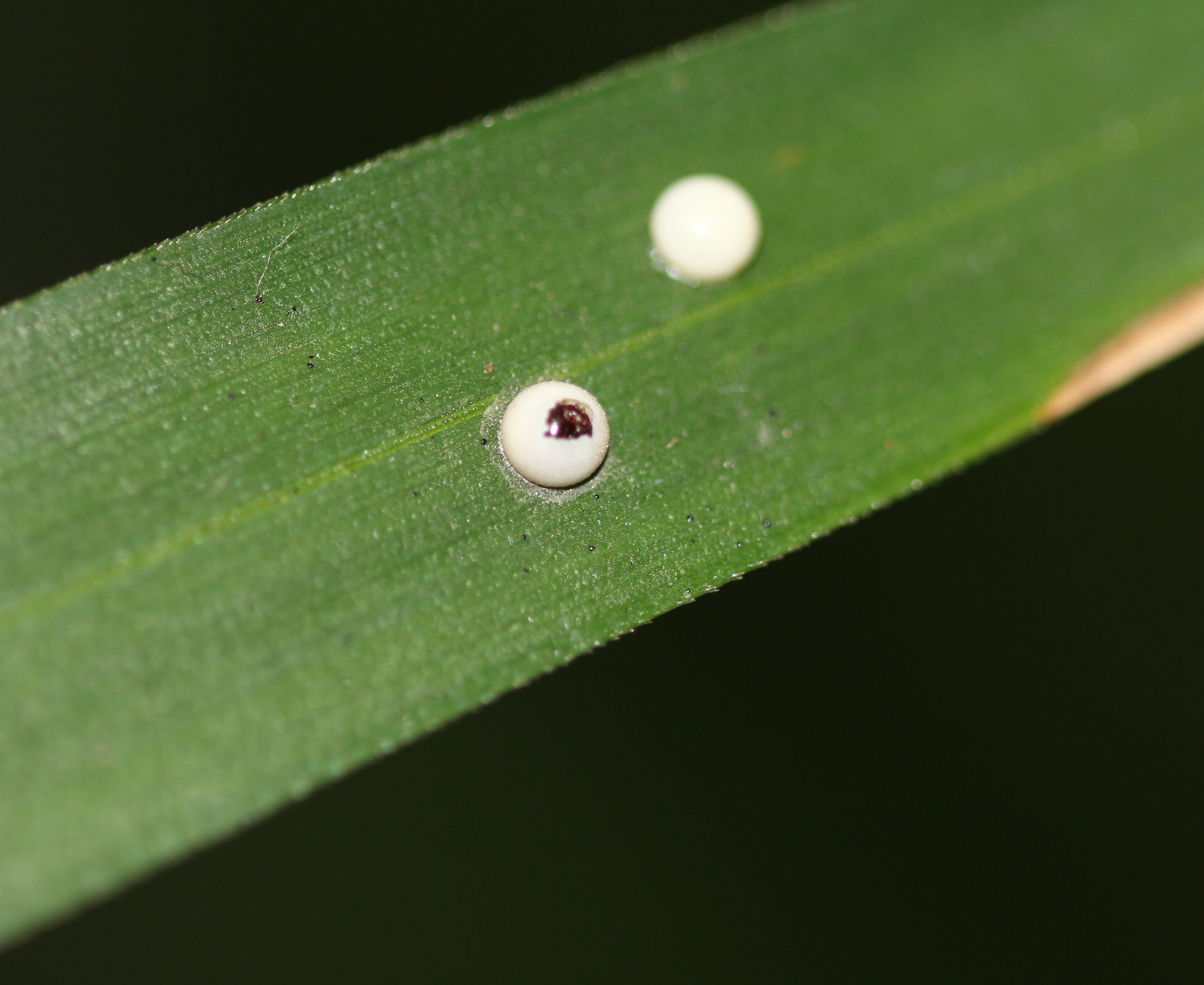
Giant redeye caterpillar emerging from its egg

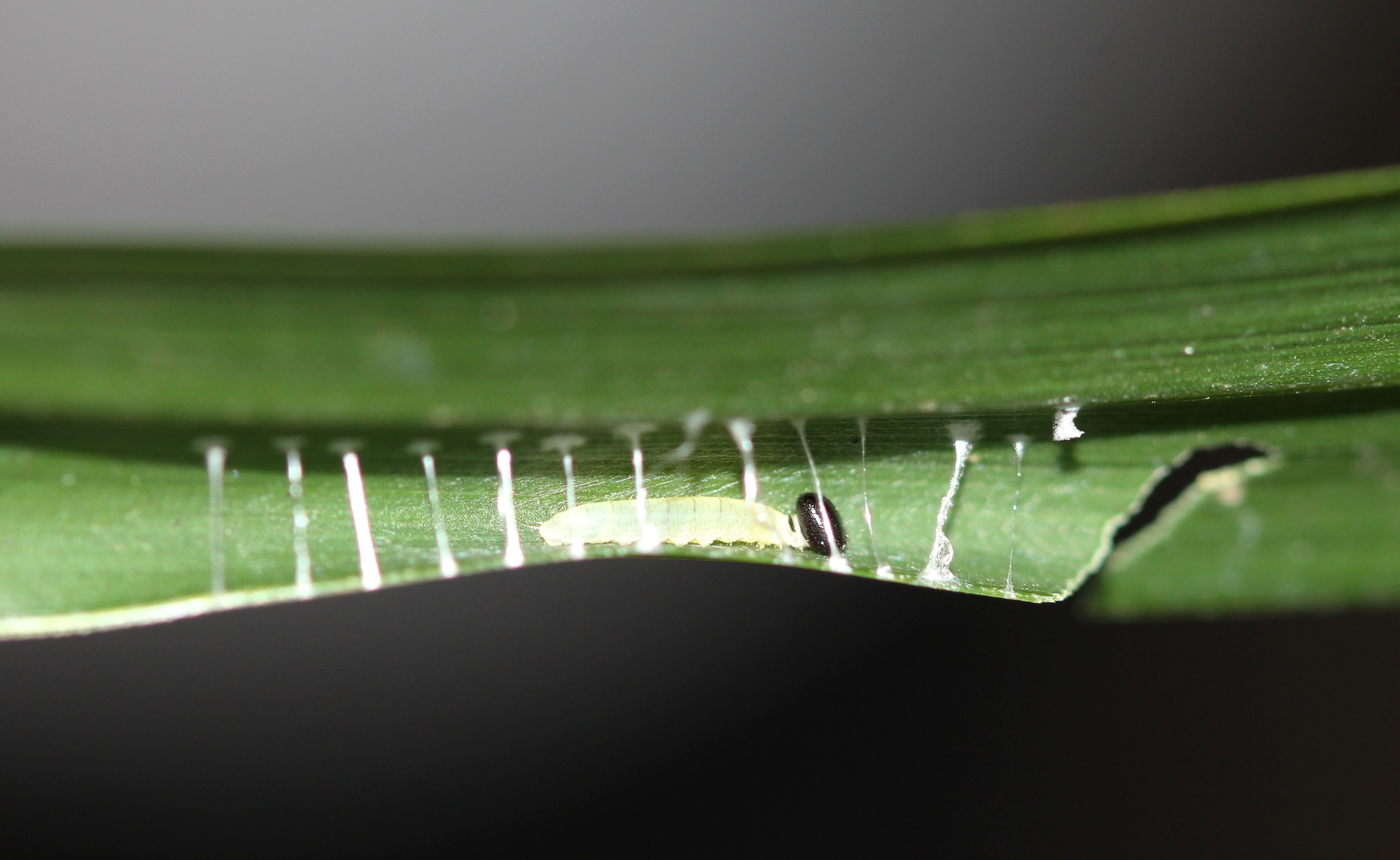
Giant redeye first instar caterpillar

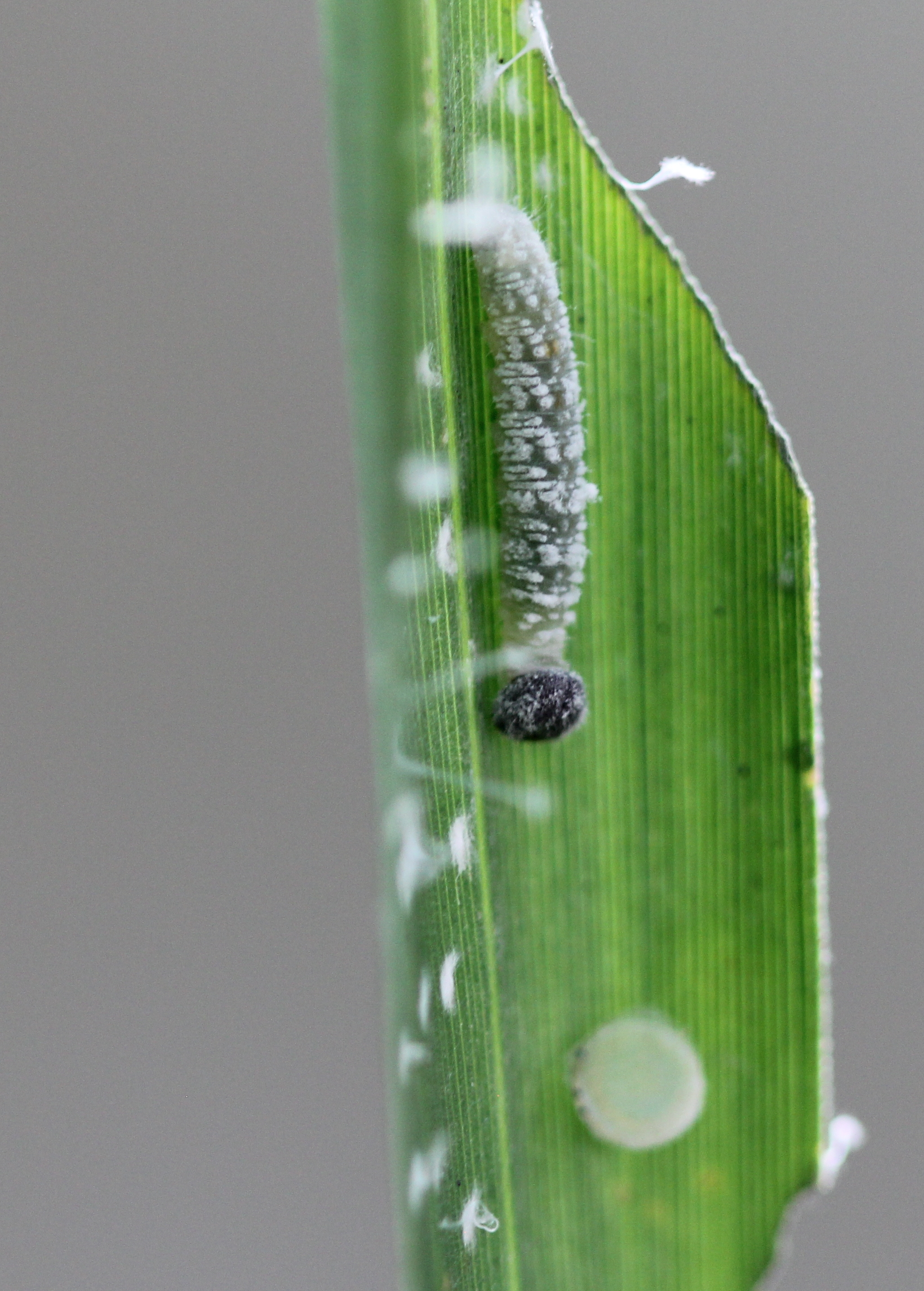
Giant redeye second instar caterpillar

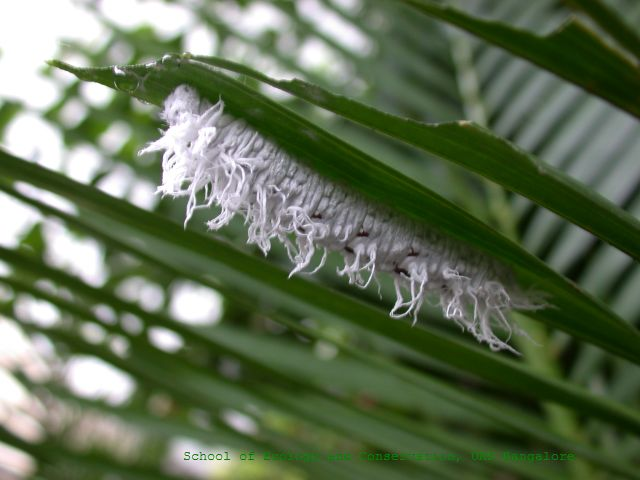
Caterpillar

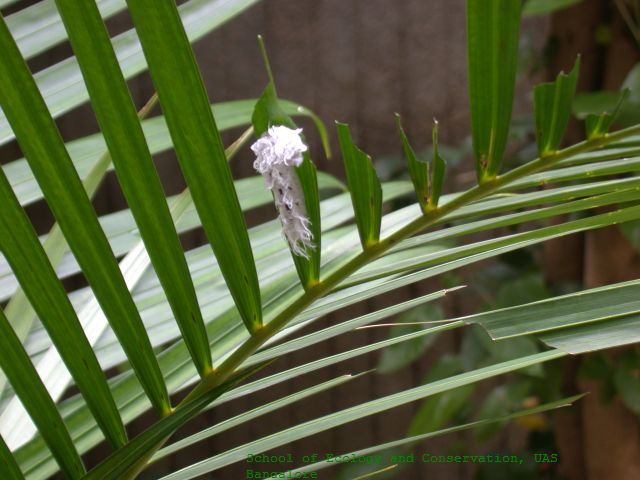
Caterpillar

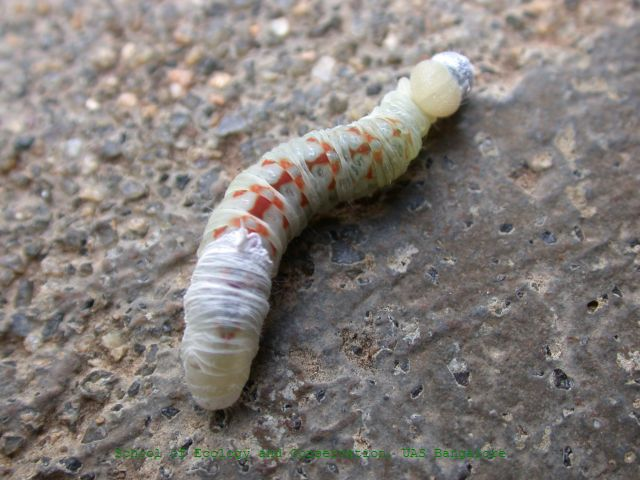
Caterpillar without the wax

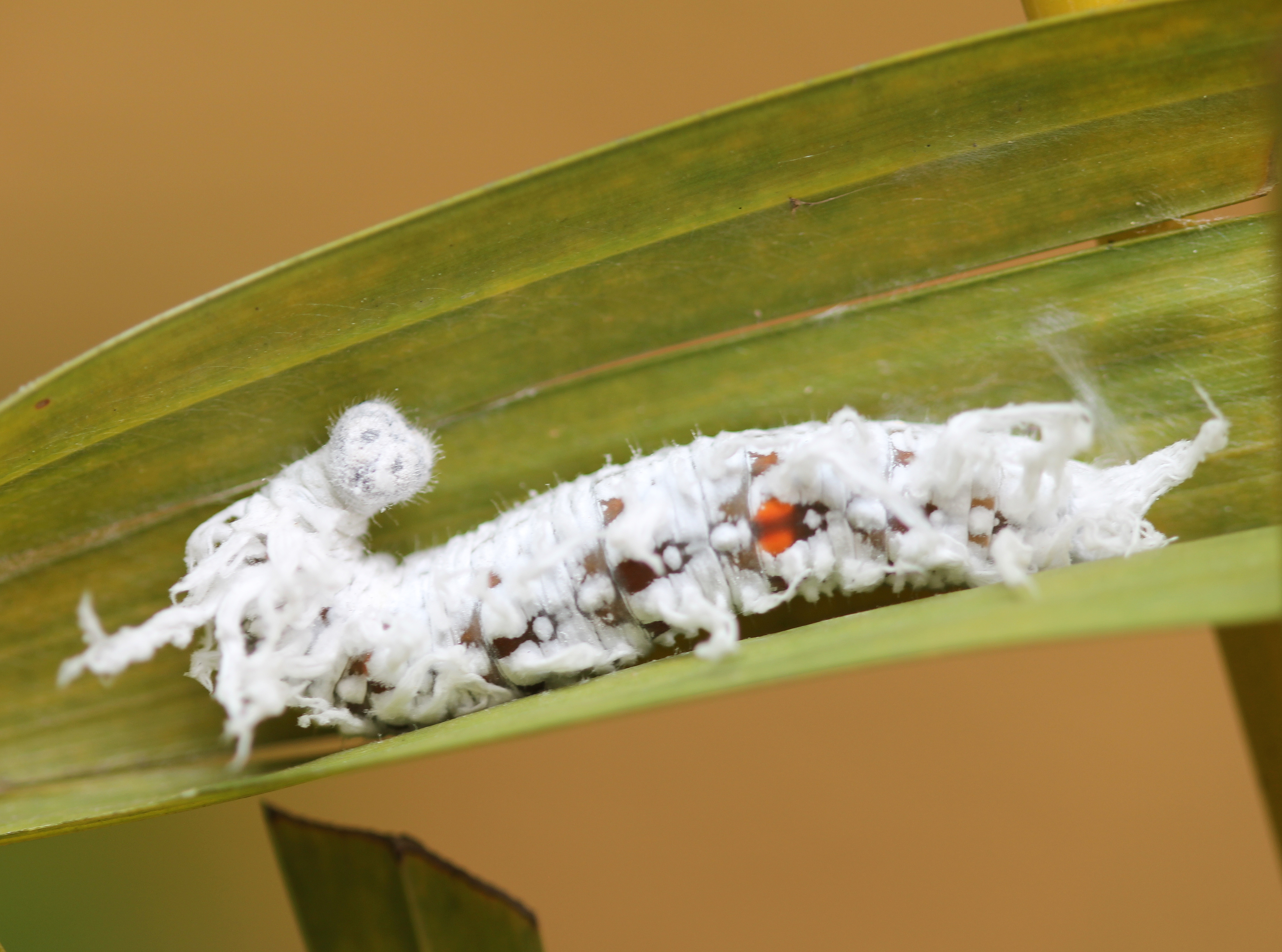
Giant redeye caterpillar in its later instar

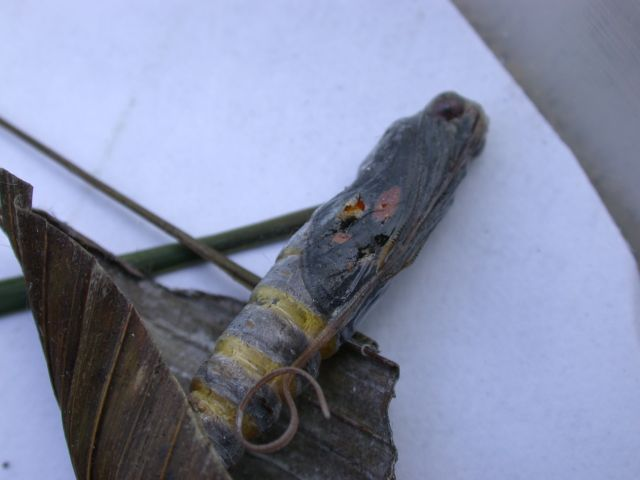
Pupa

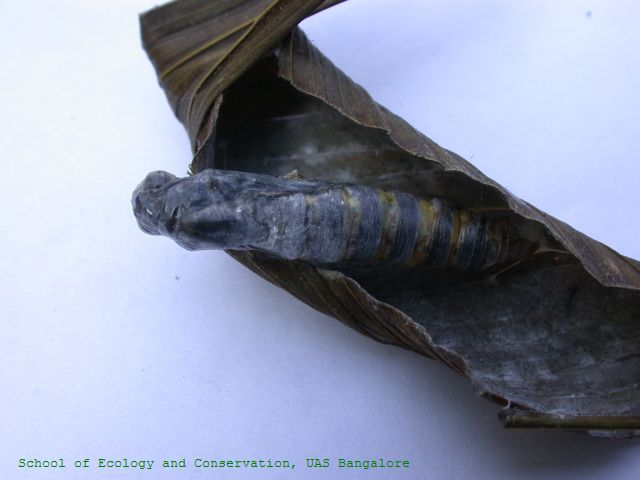
Pupa

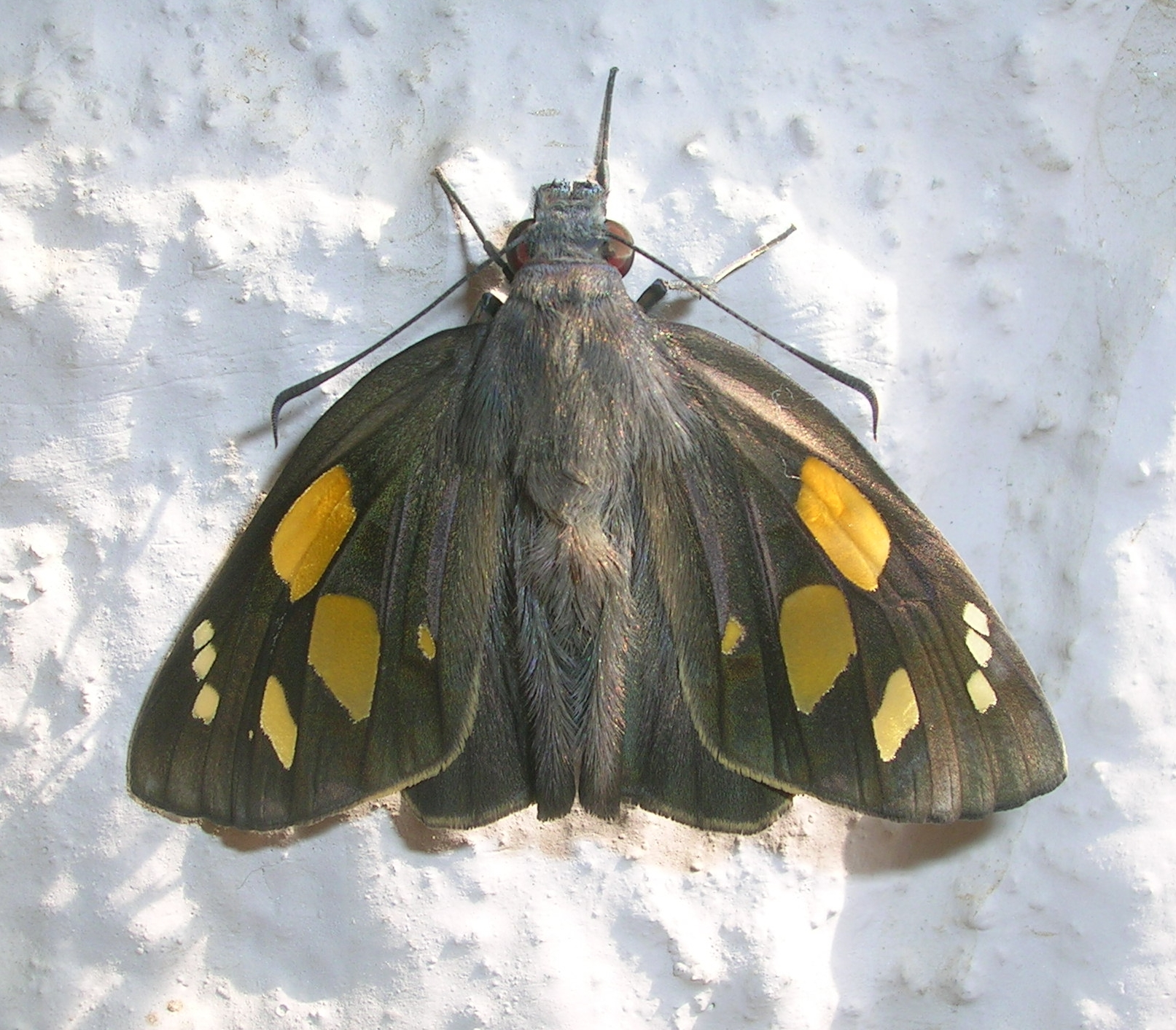
A freshly emerged specimen

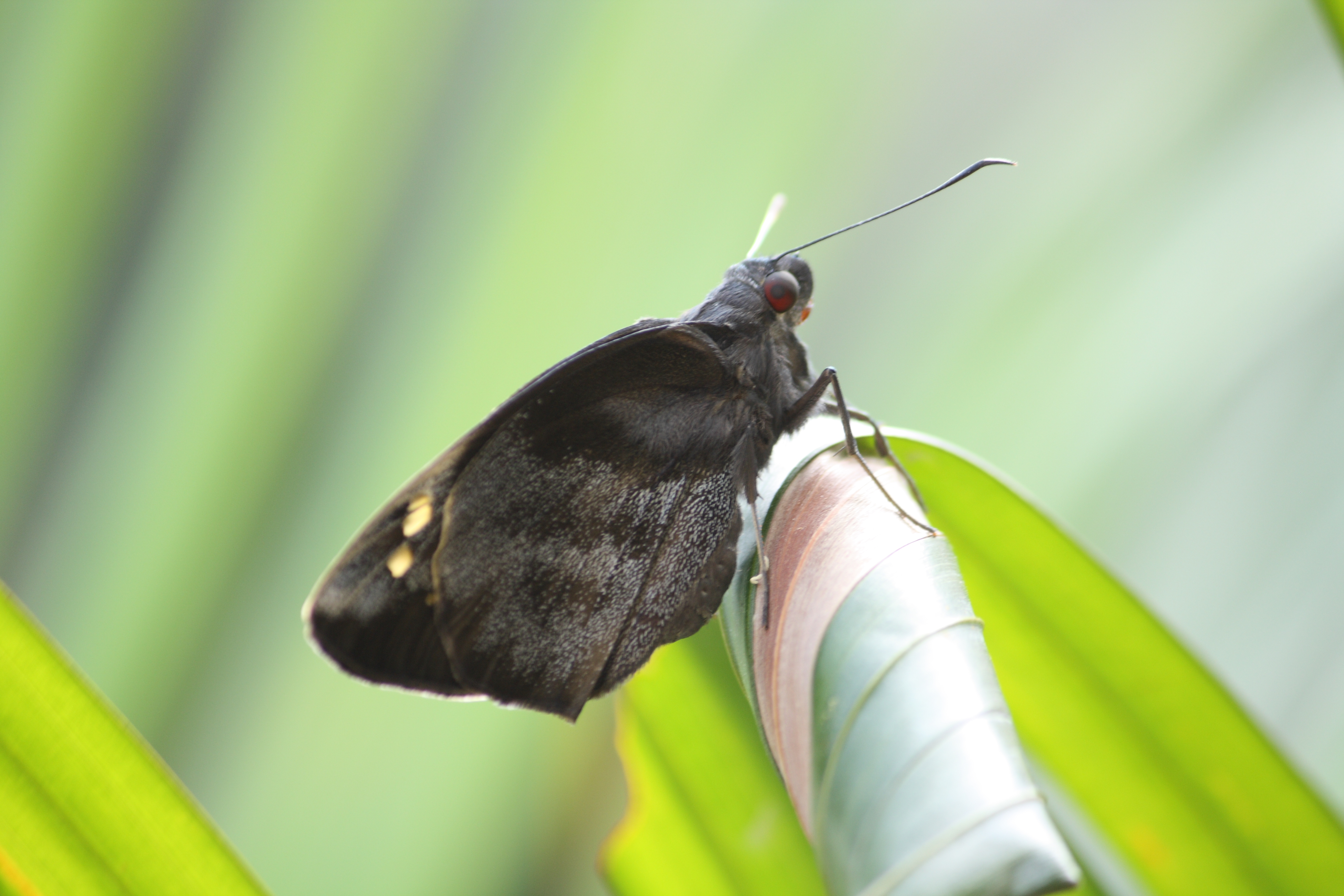
Giant redeye
