= Cyrtostachys loriae =

Conservation status
- Data Deficient (IUCN 2.3)

Scientific classification
- Kingdom: Plantae
- Clade: Tracheophytes
- Clade: Angiosperms
- Clade: Monocots
- Clade: Commelinids
- Order: Arecales
- Family: Arecaceae
- Genus: Cyrtostachys
- Species: C. loriae

Binomial name
- Cyrtostachys loriae Becc. (1905)

Synonyms
- Cyrtostachys brassii Burret (1935); Cyrtostachys kisu Becc. (1914); Cyrtostachys microcarpa Burret (1939); Cyrtostachys peekeliana Becc. (1914); Cyrtostachys phanerolepis Burret (1936)

Species of palm

Cyrtostachys loriae is a species of flowering plant in the family Arecaceae. It is a palm native to Papuasia – New Guinea, the Bismarck Archipelago, and the Solomon Islands. It is threatened by habitat loss.

The IUCN assessed the conservation status of the species' synonym Cyrtostachys kisu as "data deficient", based on a range limited to Choiseul and Baga in the Solomon Islands. It is now recognized as having a wider range.
