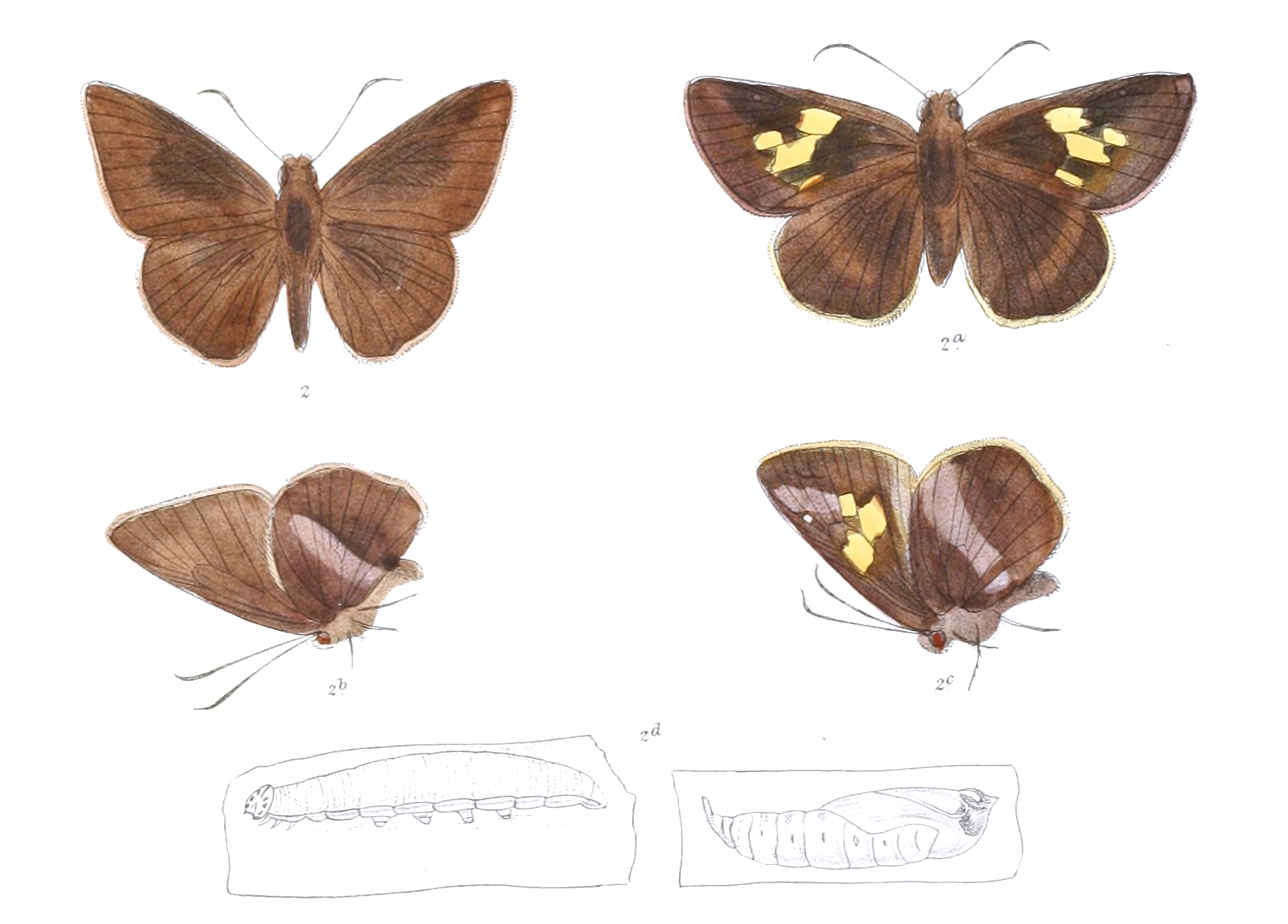

Scientific classification
- Kingdom: Animalia
- Phylum: Arthropoda
- Class: Insecta
- Order: Lepidoptera
- Family: Hesperiidae
- Genus: Gangara
- Species: G. lebadea

Binomial name
- Gangara lebadea (Hewitson, 1886)

= Gangara lebadea =

Banded redeye

Species of butterfly

Gangara lebadea, commonly known as the banded redeye, is a species of hesperid butterfly found in Southeast Asia.

== Description ==
Male. Wings above dark fuliginous brown; anterior wings with a large discal patch of dark fuscous silky hairs; posterior wings with the fringe pale ochraceous, and with two pale raised discal elongate glandular pouches situated on the second and third median veins. Wings beneath paler than above; anterior wings with the disc darkest, the inner area palest, and with a long tuft of coarse pale ochraceous hairs on the submedian nervure; posterior wings with a transverse discal pale ochraceous fascia. Body and legs more or less concolorous with wings. Antennae blackish, their hooked apices ochraceous."

The following is the description of the local race andamanica. "Male. Wings above dark brown of a slightly greenish tinge, all without spots. Anterior wings bearing a huge and dense pear-shaped sericeous patch of setae glossed with greyish-greenish and extending nearly from the bottom of the angle formed at the base of the organ by the subcostal and submedian veins about to the level of the end of the fourth fifth of the length of the latter vein, with all the setae directed backwards and slightly outwards; with the costal margin purplish; the outer portion beyond the setulose patch bronzy; and the cilia pale luteous. Posterior wings purple-glossed, with two subparallel raised discal longitudinal lines of modified scales attached to the apparently thickened bases of the first and second median veinlets, and with the cilia pale orange. Anterior wings below bronzy-brown with a patch of brilliant amethyst purple sparsely irrorated with white scales and extending from the end of the cell nearly to the apex of each organ, and with the basal portion of the wing-membrane behind the median vein and its first branch whitey-brown passing to ashy posteriorly, and with a tuft of brown-tipped yellow setae arranged longitudinally upon and on each side of the basal half of the submedian vein. Posterior wings below purple-glossed, darkest over the scent-glands, with an interrupted transverse discal band of white scales from near the abdominal margin to the middle of the organs, where it diffuses itself widely over a diffused patch of amethyst-purple.

Female. All the wings above and below paler and duller and glossed with purple, the anterior ones spotted. Anterior wings suffused with purple on the disc, which bears three semi-transparent yellow lustrous spots of the same size, relative proportions, and shape as in C. [Unkana] attina, Hewitson, with a fourth smaller and elongate yellow opaque spot placed just in front of the submedian vein rather beyond the middle of the organs.

Eyes blood-red.

Antennae purplish brown with the club bright luteous below.

"The patch of setae on the upperside of the anterior wings, the yellow tuft (which probably serves as a scent-fan) on the underside of the same wings, and the lines of modified scales (which probably cover the scent glands as they seem soiled as if by some exuding fluid) on the upperside of the posterior wings are structures peculiar to the male sex." (Wood-Mason and de Niceville, I. c.)

"G. lebadea, var. andamanica differs from G. lebadea, Hewitson, described from Borneo, in the male being larger, the cilia of the forewing pale yellow instead of white; and in the presence on the underside of the forewing of a prominent oblique powdery patch of violet scales extending from the end of the discoidal cell to the apex of the wing." (de Niceville.)

Wing expanse 55 mm.
