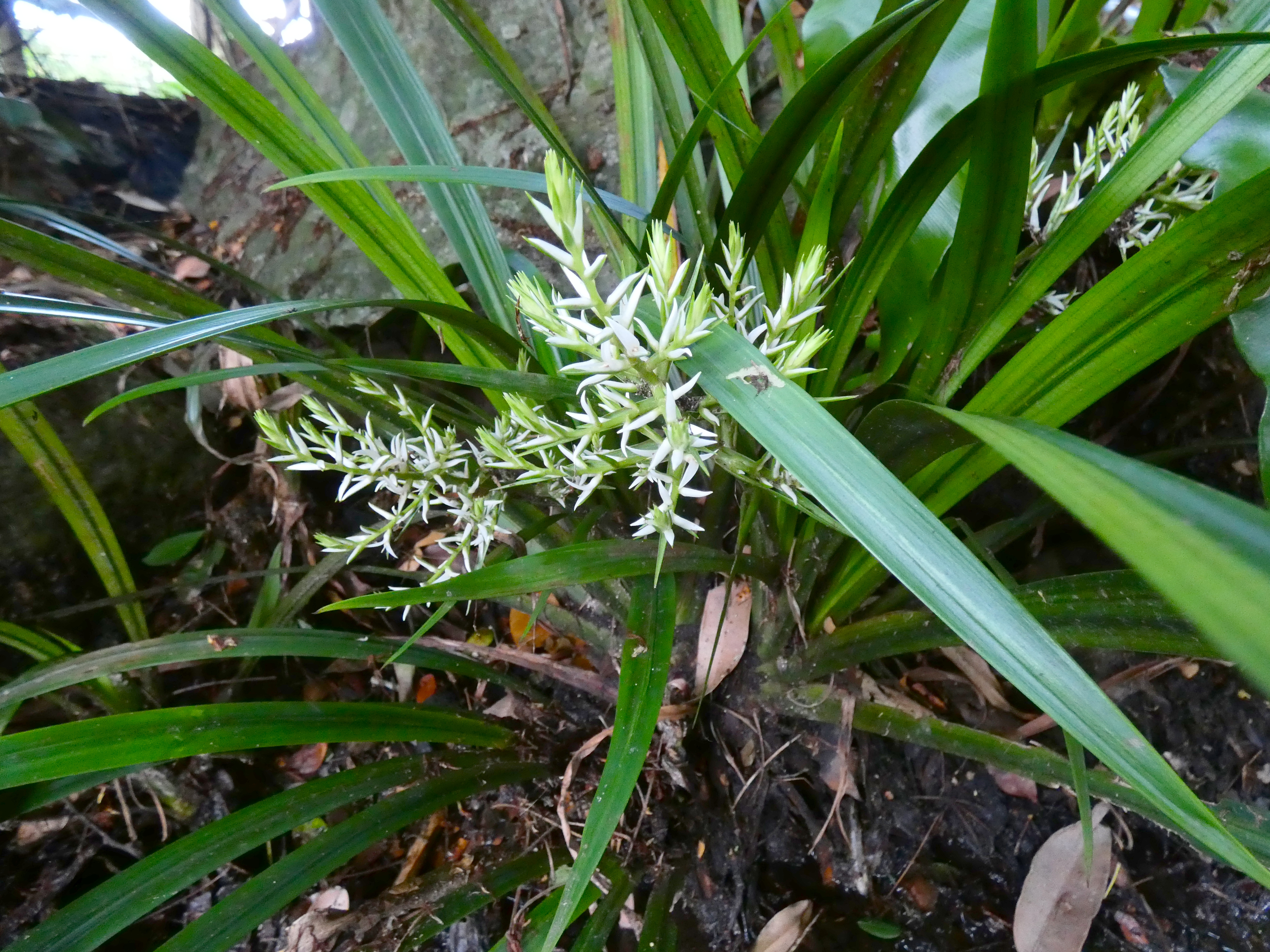
- In flower at Cairns Botanic Gardens

Conservation status
- Least Concern (NCA)

Scientific classification
- Kingdom: Plantae
- Clade: Tracheophytes
- Clade: Angiosperms
- Clade: Monocots
- Clade: Commelinids
- Order: Commelinales
- Family: Philydraceae
- Genus: Helmholtzia
- Species: H. acorifolia

Binomial name
- Helmholtzia acorifolia F.Muell.
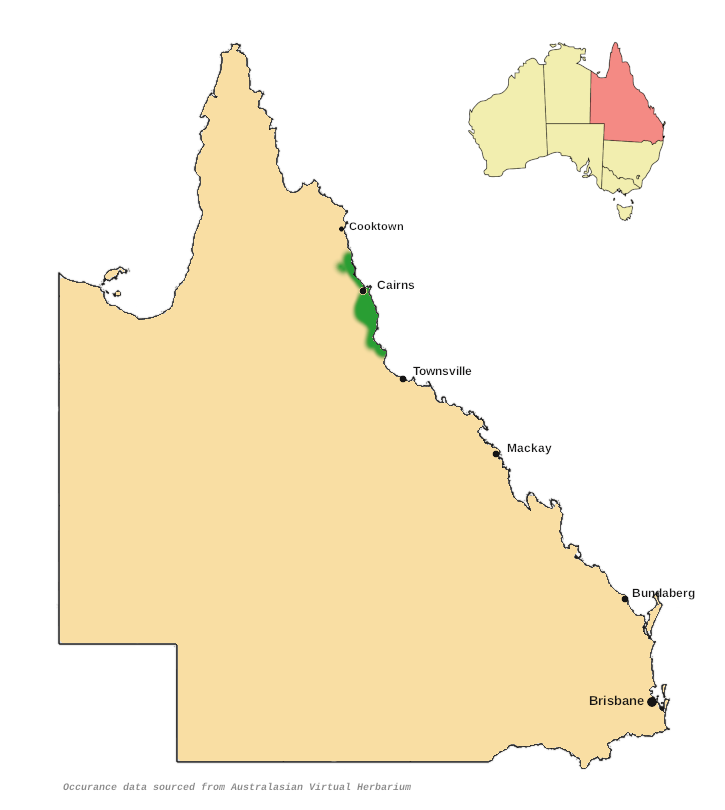

Synonyms
- Philydrum helmholtzii F.Muell.

= Helmholtzia acorifolia =

Species of flowering plant

Helmholtzia acorifolia, commonly known as kuranda or puckerum, is a species of plant in the family Philydraceae. It is native to the Wet Tropics bioregion of Queensland, Australia.

== Description ==
Helmholtzia acorifolia is a monocotyledonous plant with strap-like leaves held in a fanned arrangement. The leaves are smooth on both sides and on the edges, and measure up to about 1 m (3 ft 3 in) long and 4 cm (1.6 in) wide. They have a number of parallel veins which run lengthwise along the leaf.

The inflorescences are panicles about 30 cm (12 in) long, carrying numerous white flowers on lateral spikes. Individual flowers are sessile (i.e. without a stem) and crowded together. They have four tepals, the outer ones measuring about 14 mm (0.55 in) long, the inner tepals much shorter at about 3 mm (0.12 in) long. The stamen is about 4 mm (0.16 in) long with bright yellow anthers, and the style is about 4 mm (0.16 in) long.

The fruit is a translucent white, nearly spherical berry about 7 mm (0.28 in) long and wide. It contains numerous small seeds about 2 mm (0.08 in) long.

== Distribution and habitat ==
It is endemic to coastal parts of northeastern Queensland, from Ngalba Bulal National Park about 40 km (25 mi) south of Cooktown, to near Cardwell. It inhabits upland rainforest, usually close to permanent water, mostly at altitudes from 400 to 1,500 m (1,300 to 4,900 ft), occasionally at lower levels.

== Taxonomy ==
Helmholtzia acorifolia was first described by Victorian colonial botanist Ferdinand von Mueller, based on plant specimens collected by John Dallachy in the vicinity of Rockingham Bay in northern Queensland. It was published in his book Fragmenta phytographiæ Australiæ.

The genus Helmholtzia is placed in Philydraceae, a small family in the order Commelinales.

=== Etymology ===
The generic name Helmholtzia was chosen by Mueller in honour of German scientist Hermann von Helmholtz. The species epithet acorifolia is a reference to the similarity of the leaves of this plant to those of the genus Acorus.

The common name 'kuranda' is the Aboriginal name for the plant, and is also the name given to a small town near Cairns.

== Conservation ==
This species is listed as least concern under the Queensland Government's Nature Conservation Act. As of 27 February 2026, it has not been assessed by the International Union for Conservation of Nature (IUCN).

== Gallery ==
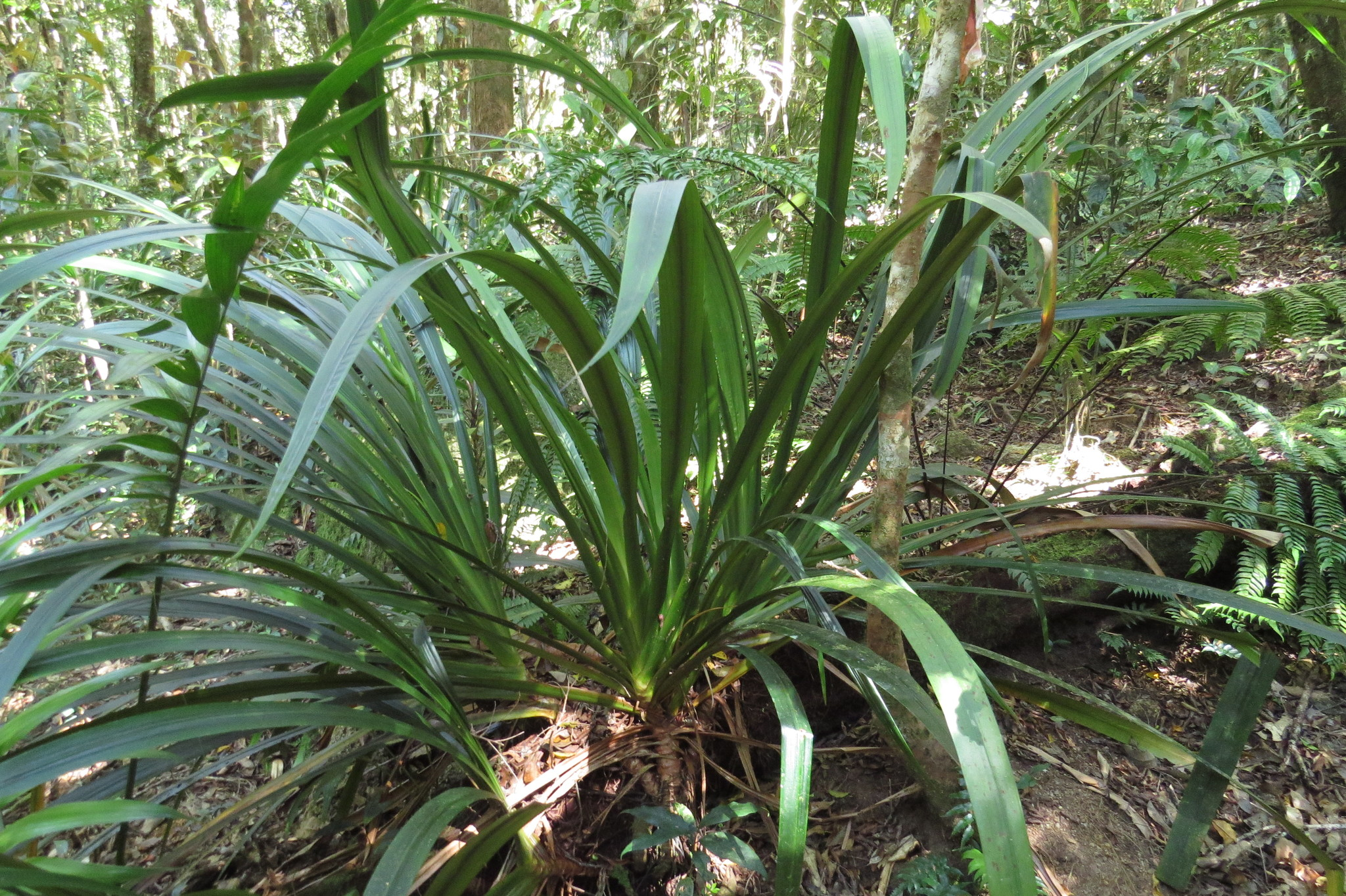
Habit

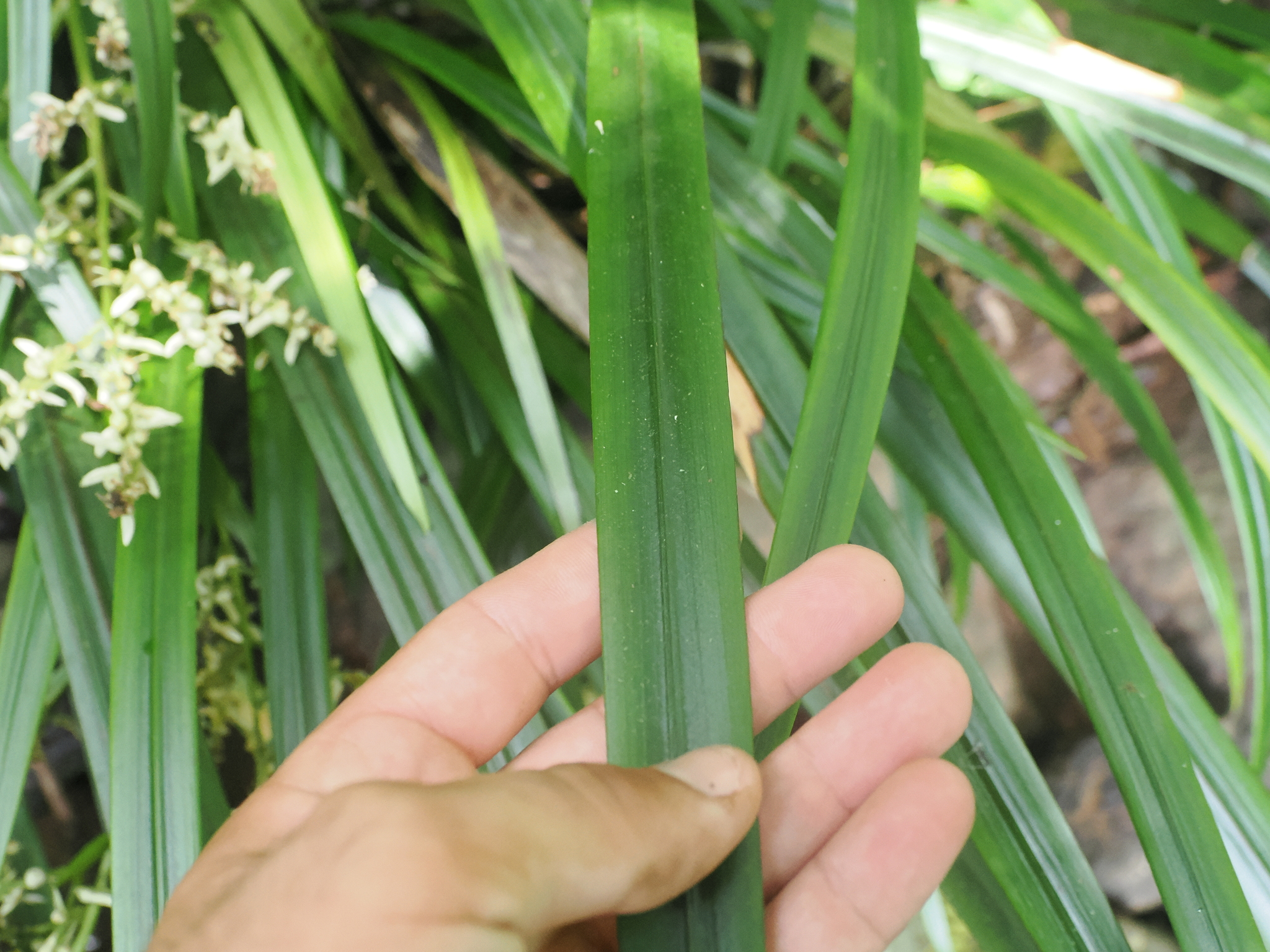
Leaf

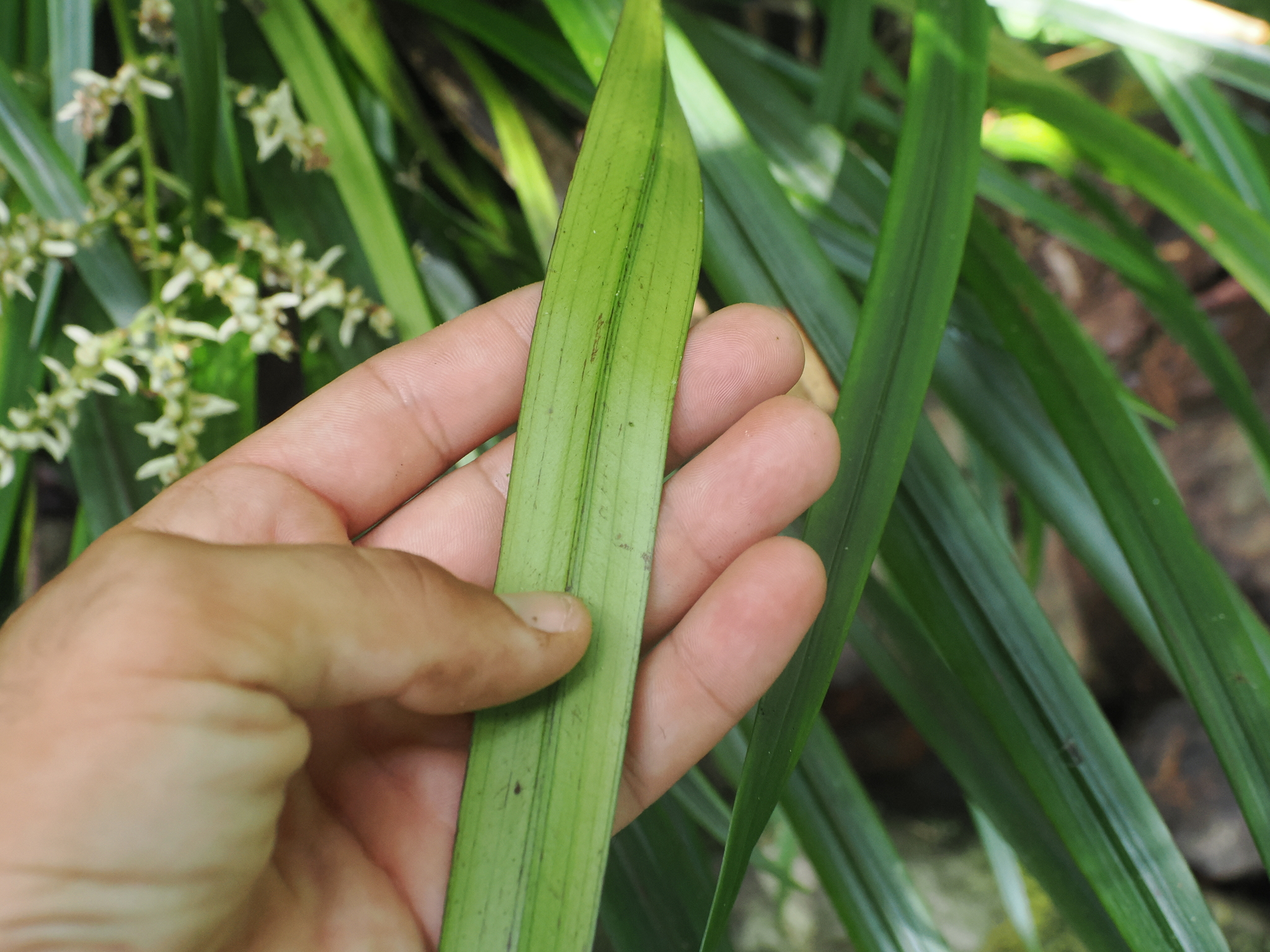
Leaf underside

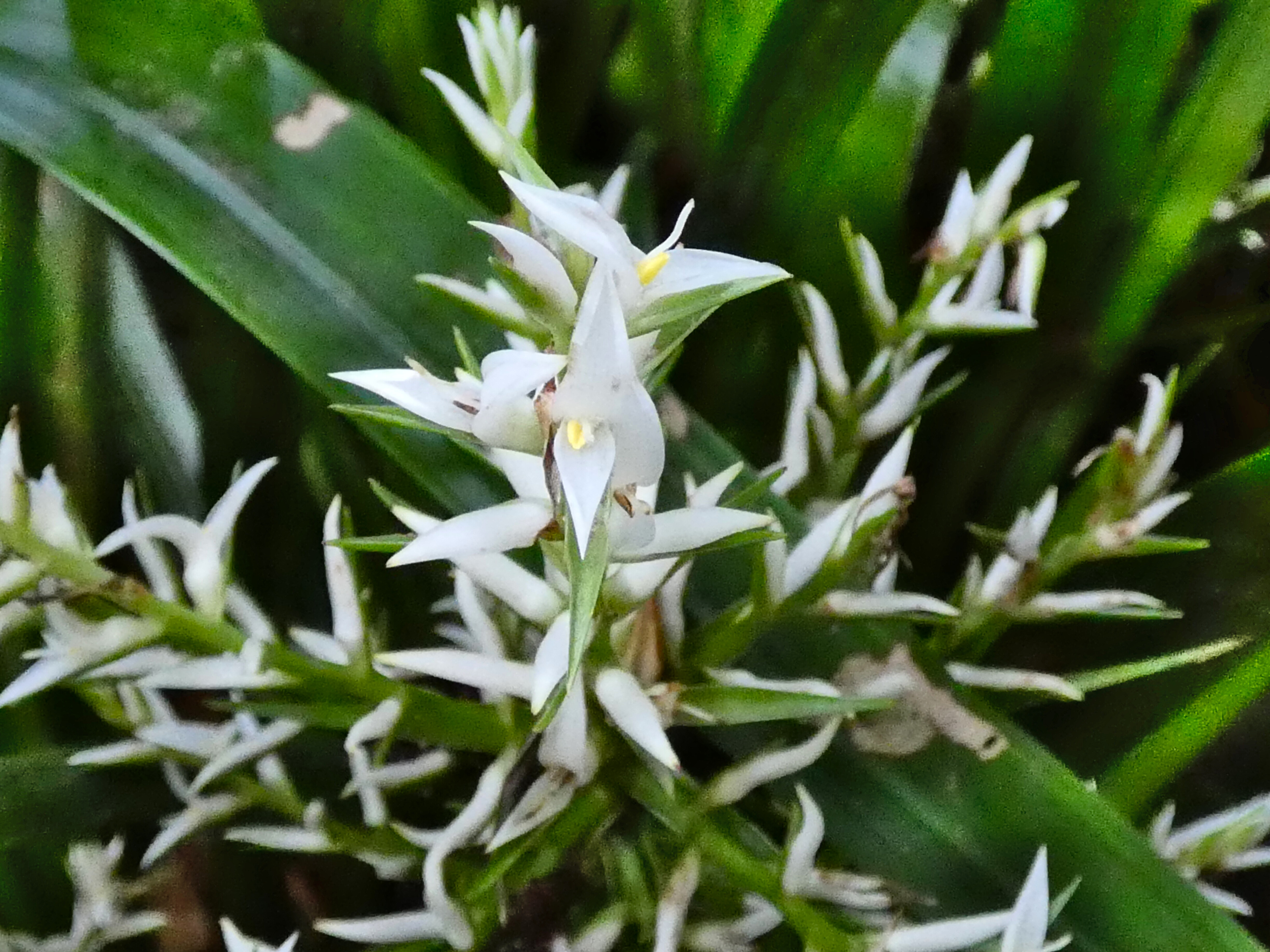
Flowers
