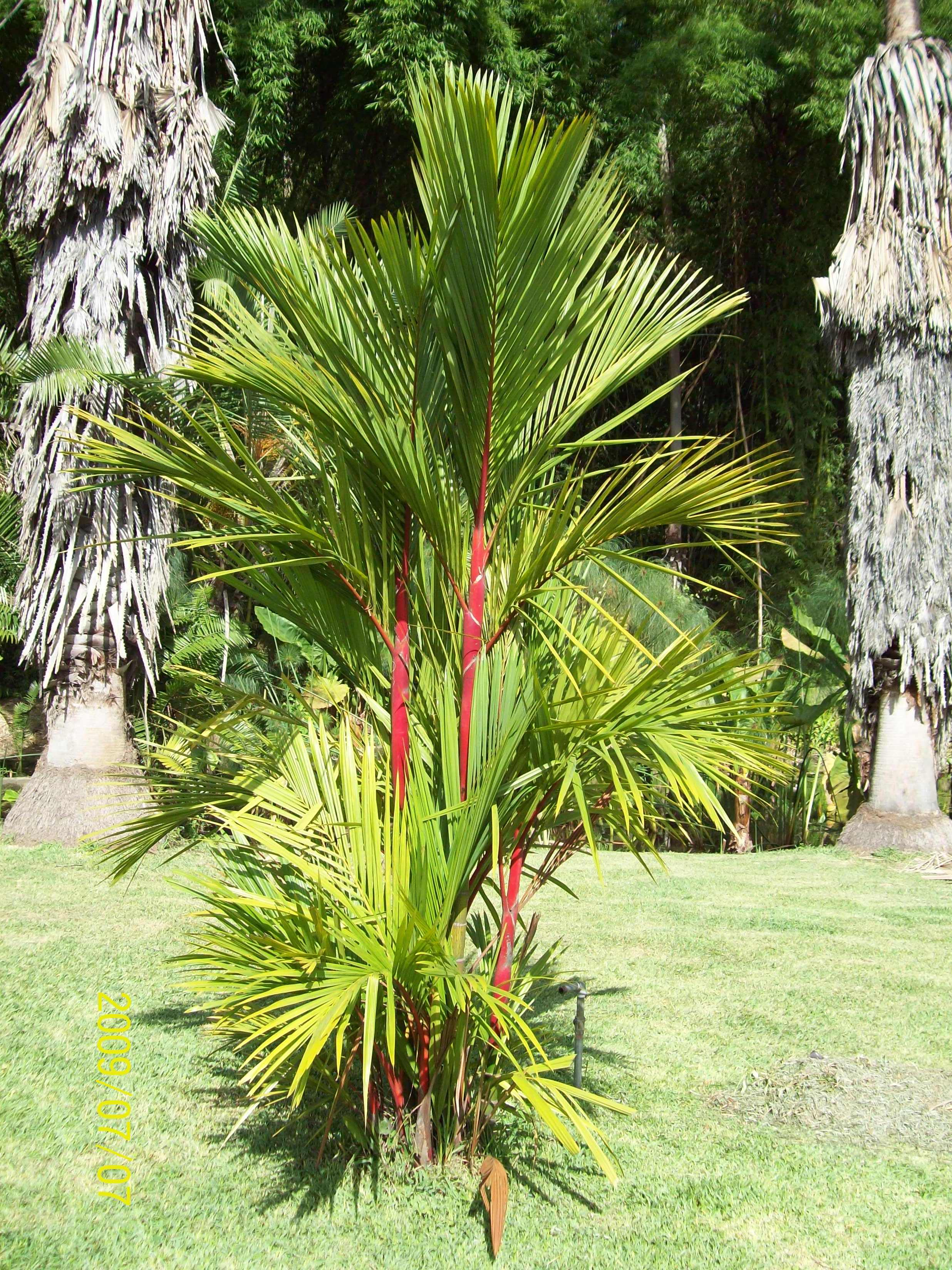
- Cyrtostachys renda in the Central University of Venezuela Botanical Garden

Scientific classification
- Kingdom: Plantae
- Clade: Tracheophytes
- Clade: Angiosperms
- Clade: Monocots
- Clade: Commelinids
- Order: Arecales
- Family: Arecaceae
- Genus: Cyrtostachys
- Species: C. renda

Binomial name
- Cyrtostachys renda Blume

Synonyms
- Cyrtostachys rendah (common misspelling); Areca erythropoda Miq. (1861); Pinanga purpurea Miq., invalid name published as synonym (1861); Ptychosperma coccinea Teijsm. & Binn. (1866).; Areca erythrocarpa H.Wendl. in O.C.E.de Kerchove de Denterghem (1878); Cyrtostachys lacca [lakka] var. singaporensis Becc. (1885); Cyrtostachys lakka Becc. (1885)

= Cyrtostachys renda =

Species of palm

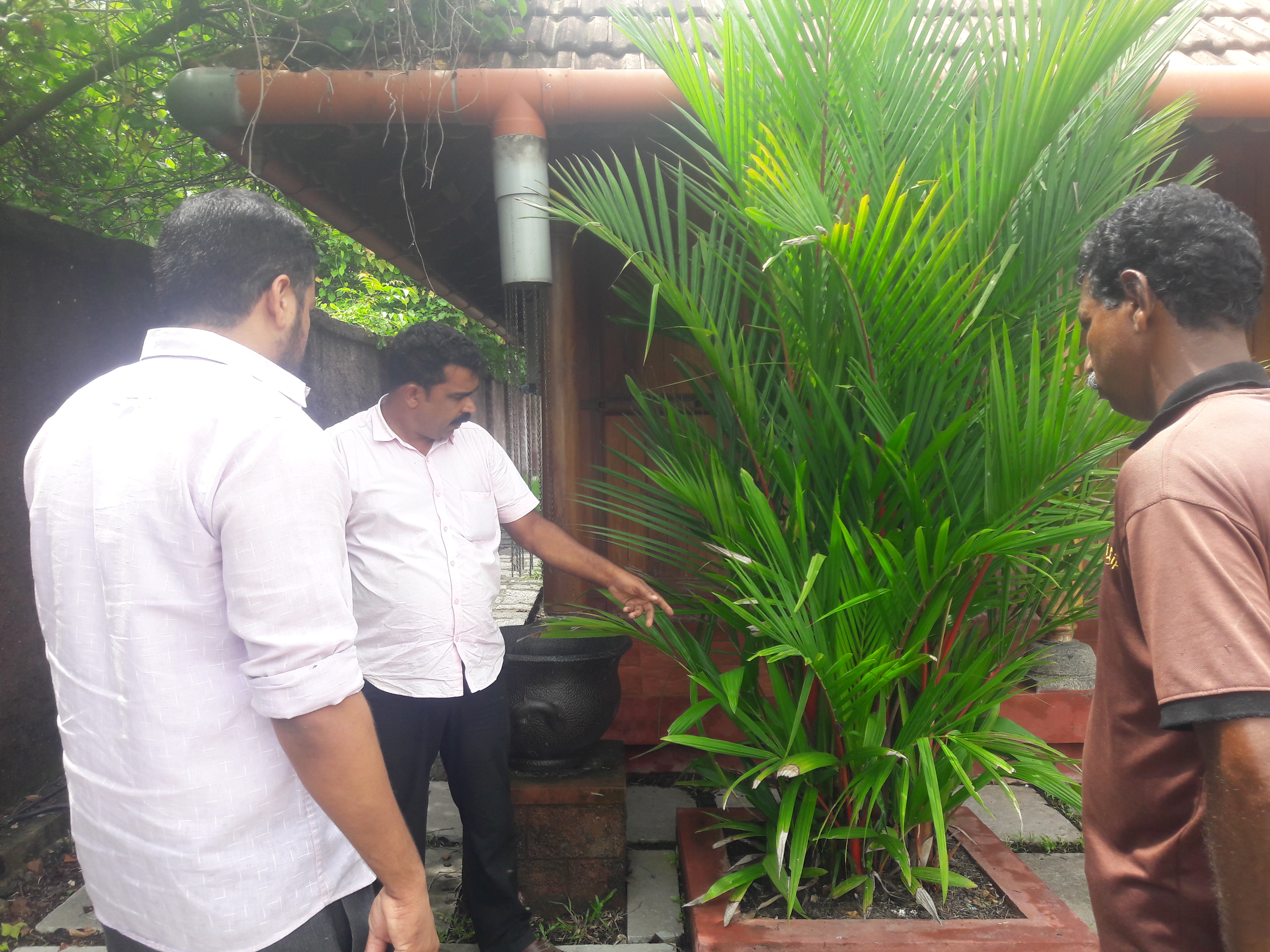
Cyrtostachys renda

Cyrtostachys renda, also known by the common names red sealing wax palm and lipstick palm, is a palm that is native to Thailand, Malaysia, Sumatra and Borneo in Indonesia. It is the only species of the genus Cyrtostachys that can be found to the west of the Wallace Line, the faunal boundary separating the biogeographic realms of Asia and Wallacea. Cyrtostachys renda's name is derived from several words: the Greek prefix κυρτό- (cyrto-) meaning bent or curved, the Greek word σταχυς (stachys) meaning "an ear of grain", and "renda" a Malayan Aboriginal word for palm, which happens to be homonymous to the Portuguese word "renda," meaning income.

Because of its bright red crownshafts and leaf sheaths, Cyrtostachys renda has become a popular ornamental plant exported to many tropical regions around the world. Although it is not the source of sealing wax, the red sealing wax palm got its name because its crownshafts and leaf sheaths have the same color as the wax used to seal letters close and later (from about the 16th century) envelopes.

== Description ==
Also known as the red palm, rajah palm, and Malay: pinang rajah, Cyrtostachys renda is a slender multi-stemmed, slow-growing, clustering palm tree. It can grow to 16 metres (52 feet) tall. It has a scarlet to bright red colored crownshaft and leaf sheath, making it distinct from all other species of Arecaceae.

The plant's stipe grows up to 10 centimetres (3.9 inches) in diameter. Its petioles grow up to 15 centimetres (5.9 inches) long and have pinnate leaves have about 50 pairs of pinnae. The plant's fruits are ovoid, 1.4 centimetres (0.55 inches) in diameter, green, turning to a dark bluish-black when ripe.

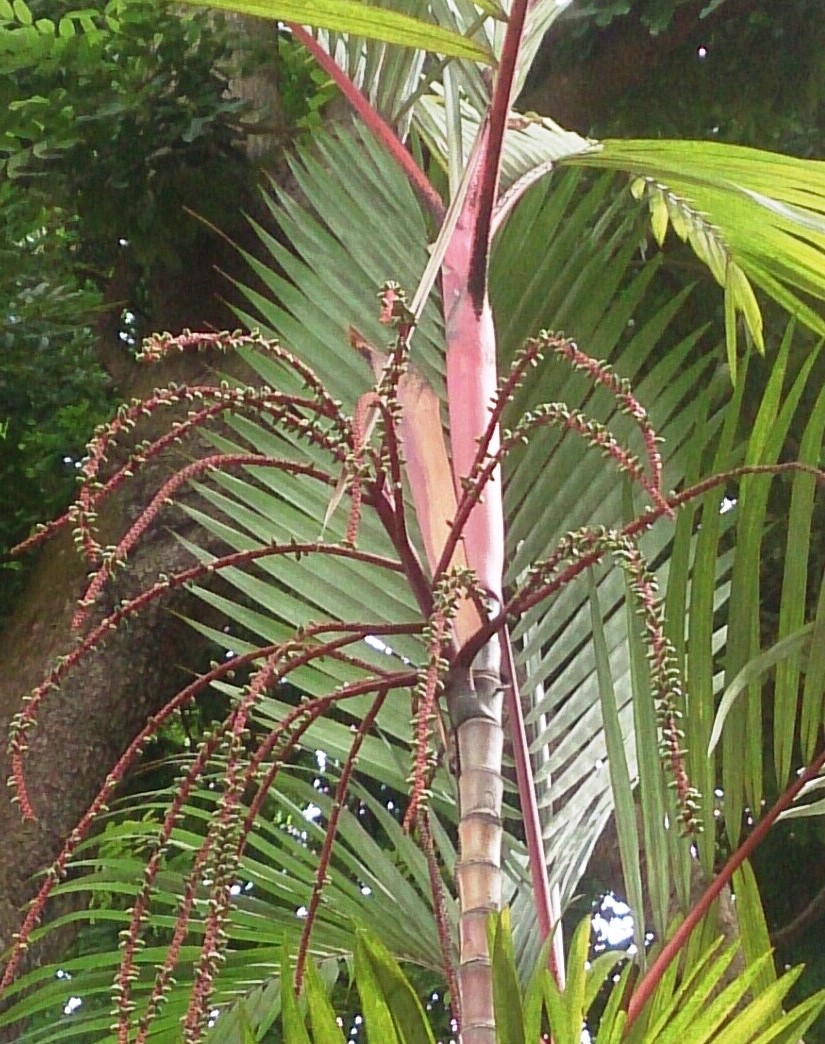
Cyrtostachys renda inflorescence

=== Heterotypic synonyms ===
The use of Crytostachys lakka (and Cyrtostachys lacca) as a synonym for Cyrtostachys renda was developed by Italian botanist Odoardo Beccari. The Italian word "lacca" means lacquer or varnish. (Note: The italian word "lacca" happens to be homonymous with the Finnish word "lakka" meaning varnish, cloudberry (Rubus chamaemorus) and the eponymous liqueur, Lakkalikööri, made from that fruit. The Finnish word has caused confusion among botanists regarding this synonym for Cyrtostachys renda because neither the cloudberry nor the liqueur bear any semblance to the Lipstick Palm (see Cyrtostachys renda Blume by Donald Simpson and page 8 of "Autecology and Conservation Management of a Rare Palm Species: The Case Study of Lipstick Palm Cyrtostachys renda Blume in Kerumutan Wildlife Sanctuary, Riau" by Didik Widyatmoko).)

- Pinanga rubricaulis Linden (1885)

== Cultivation and uses ==
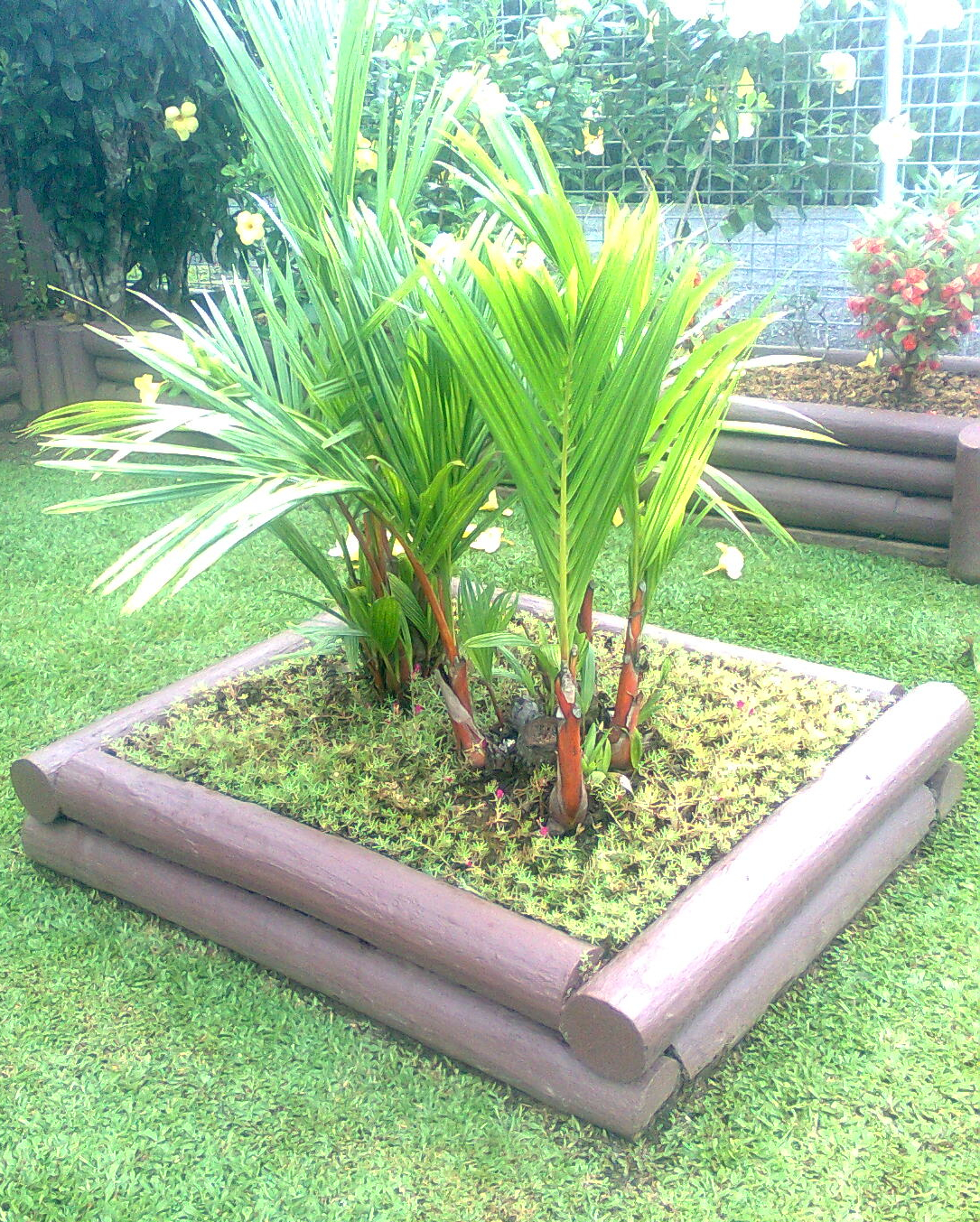
Ornamental Cyrtostachys renda in a garden in Suva, Fiji

The lipstick palm is generally grown for its brightly colored and unusual foliage and it is considered as a plant in high demand for gardening and a landscaping projects. Because of difficulties propagating them and their striking color, the palm has been offered for sale at prices as high as $1000 USD to collectors and gardeners. It also has some limited traditional uses such as for flooring materials, roof thatching, and for making darts in Pahang and elsewhere in Malaysia. Some rural communities in Sumatra harvest the plant for palm hearts.

Propagation can occur with fresh seeds, although they are slow to germinate, or through dividing out suckers. In the wild, the most suitable environment for growth occurs in areas of Southeast Asian lowland peat swamp forests with the following characteristics: good soil drainage, high sand content in the soil, a thin peat layer in the soil, a low carbon to nitrogen ratio (C/N) in the soil, low acid, and nutrient levels in the soil and water but relatively high organic substance levels. The palm grows well in full sun or shade but needs humid conditions and well-draining soil. However, it also tolerates flooding and can grow in standing water as its native habitat is peat swamp forests. It will not tolerate cold temperatures or periods of drought; it is rated as hardiness zone 11 or above and is suited to tropical rainforest or equatorial climate (Koppen Af), which doesn't have a significant dry season.

== Conservation status ==
Cyrtostachys renda was listed as "Vulnerable" on the IUCN Red List in 1995. In 1999, the government of Indonesia protected it from harvest through implementing legislation. In 2000, the IUCN removed Cyrtostachys renda from its list of protected species.
