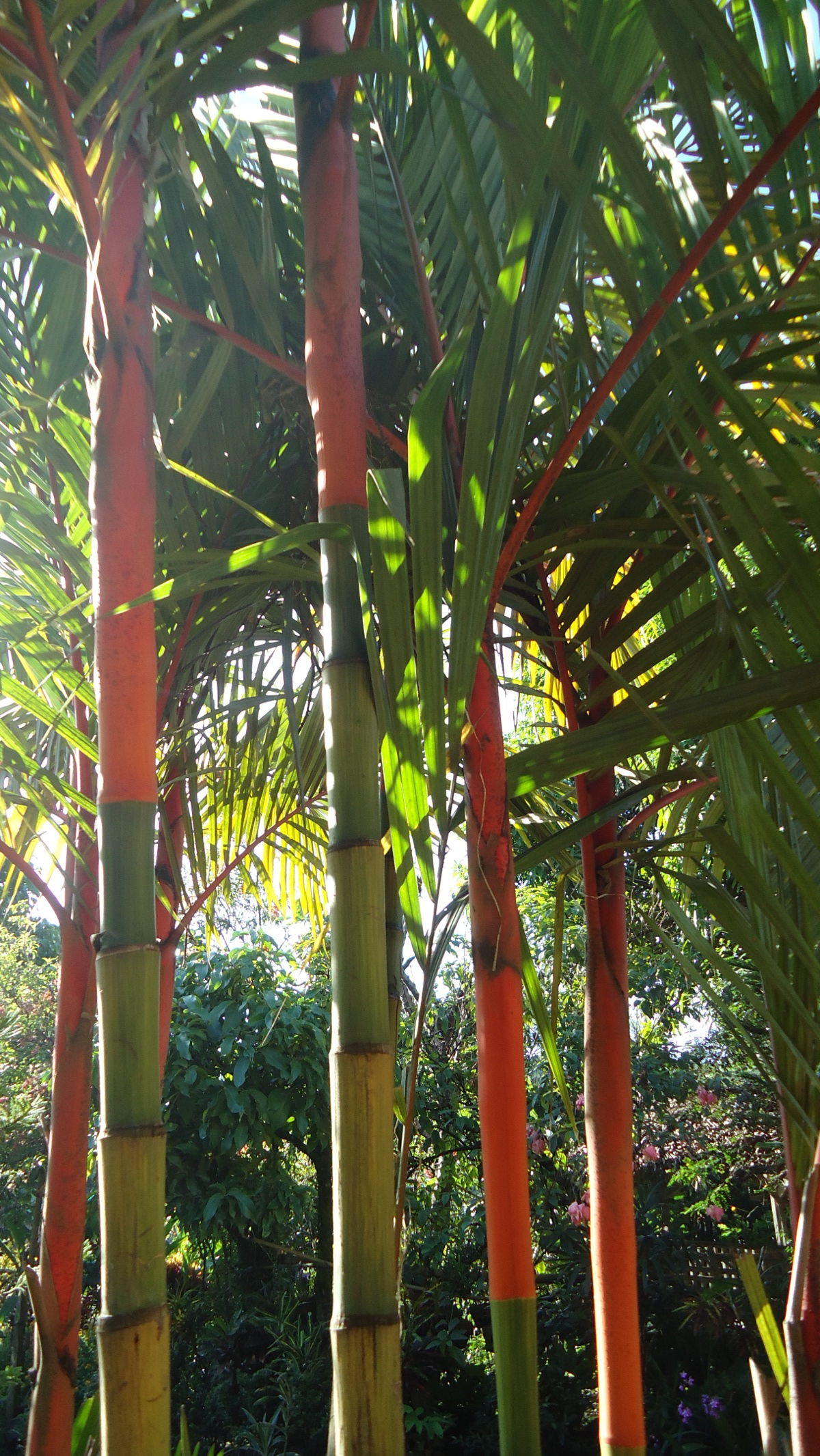
- Cyrtostachys renda (lipstick palm)

Scientific classification
- Kingdom: Plantae
- Clade: Tracheophytes
- Clade: Angiosperms
- Clade: Monocots
- Clade: Commelinids
- Order: Arecales
- Family: Arecaceae
- Subfamily: Arecoideae
- Tribe: Areceae
- Genus: Cyrtostachys; Blume

= Cyrtostachys =

Genus of palms

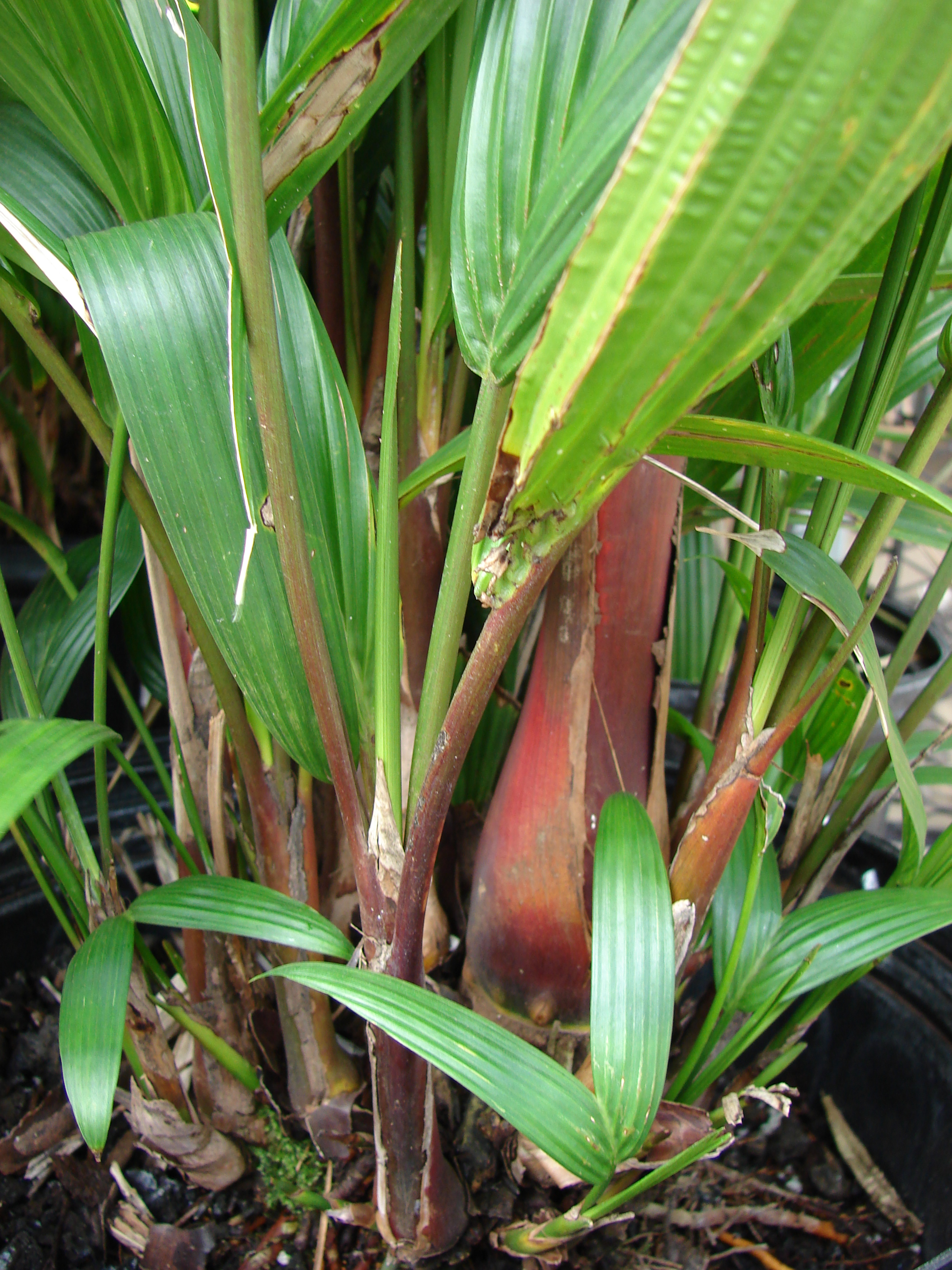
Young Cyrtostachys renda

Cyrtostachys is a genus of flowering plant in the family Arecaceae. Its species are found in southeast Asia, New Guinea, and in some of the South-Central and Southwest Pacific island habitats of the Oceanian realm.

Species:

- Cyrtostachys bakeri Heatubun - Papua New Guinea
- Cyrtostachys barbata Heatubun - western New Guinea
- Cyrtostachys elegans Burret - central New Guinea
- Cyrtostachys excelsa Heatubun - western New Guinea
- Cyrtostachys glauca H.E.Moore - Papua New Guinea
- Cyrtostachys loriae Becc. - Solomon Islands, New Guinea, Bismarck Archipelago
- Cyrtostachys renda Blume - Red candle-wax palm - Thailand, Borneo, Malaysia, Sumatra
