= Teodoro Caruel =

Italian botanist (1830–1898)

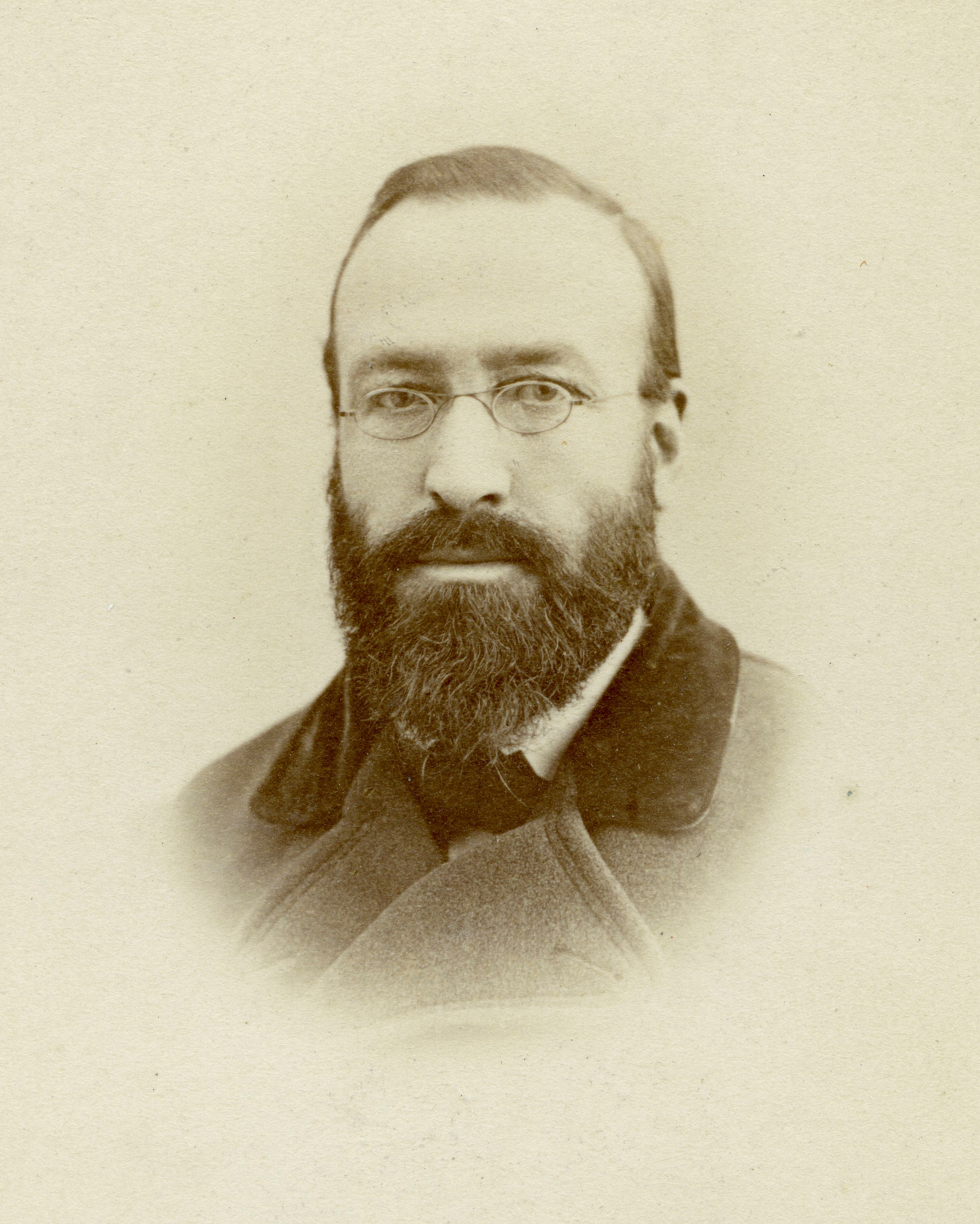
- In 1870
- Born: 27 June 1830; Chandernagor
- Died: 4 December 1898 (aged 68); Florence
- Occupation: Italian botanist

Théodore (Teodoro) Caruel (27 June 1830 – 4 December 1898) was an Italian botanist of French-English parentage who specialized in flora of Tuscany.

== Biography ==
Caruel was born in Chandernagor, a French colonial enclave north of Calcutta, where his father served as a French official while his mother was of English heritage from Calcutta. At the age of 15, he moved with his family to Florence, where soon afterwards, he developed an interest in natural sciences, in particular, flora native to Tuscany. In 1858 he began work as an assistant to Filippo Parlatore, and within a few years was given the title of coadjutor. With Parlatore, he conducted research at the Orto Botanico di Firenze (botanic museum of Florence) and worked on the development of the Florence herbarium. He also collaborated with Pietro Savi, Filippo Calandrini (1818-1867) and Adolfo Targioni Tozzetti.

In 1862 he was appointed to the University of Pavia but he did not take it up and later he was named an associate professor at the scientific academy in Milan, returning to Florence one year later as a professor of botany at the medical college. In 1871 he took the position that became vacant on the death of Pietro Savi at Pisa, and he taught classes in botany at the Athenaeum, and in 1880, again returned to Florence, this time serving as director of its botanical institute. After his death, his herbarium was donated to the botanical institute at the University of Pisa. In 1892 he suffered from an illness which caused him to be paralyzed for several years.

As a taxonomist, he circumscribed the plant families Sarcolaenaceae, Stemonaceae and Welwitschiaceae, and was the botanical authority of several genera and numerous species. The genus Caruelina (family Rubiaceae) was named in his honor by Otto Kuntze.

== Published works ==
He is credited with the continuation of Parlatore's massive "Flora Italiana" project (first volume 1848), of which he contributed several new volumes from 1884 onward. Other noted written efforts by Caruel include:

- "Illustratio in hortum siccum Andreae Caesalpini ..." (1858); On the herbarium of Andrea Caesalpino.
- "Correspondence : Caruel (Teodoro) and Engelmann (George), 1864–1880". On correspondence with American botanist George Engelmann, published in English.
- Statistica botanica della Toscana, ossia, Saggio di studi sulla distribuzione geografica delle piante toscane, (1871).
- Prodromo della flora toscana, ossia, (1880).
