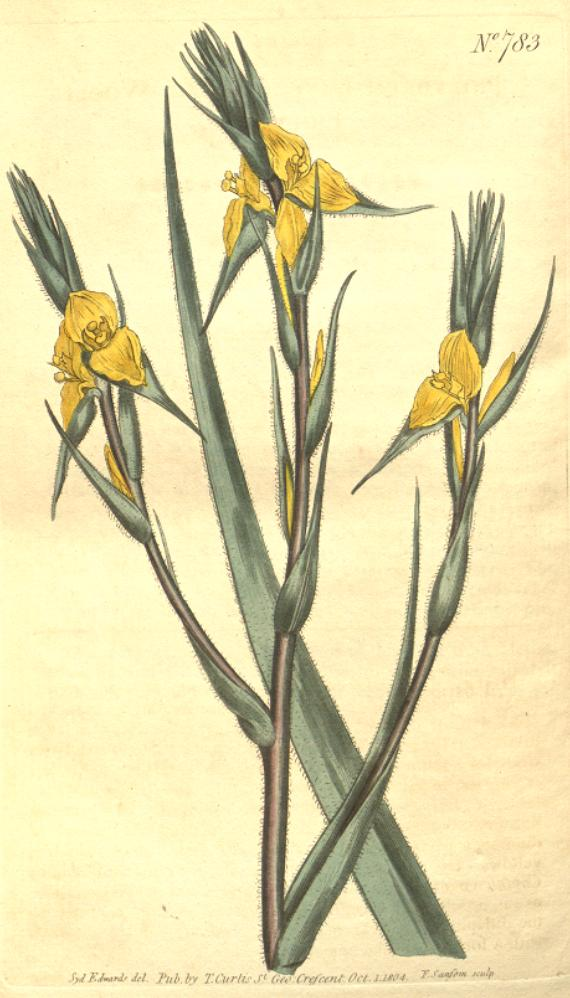
- Philydrum lanuginosum

Scientific classification
- Kingdom: Plantae
- Clade: Tracheophytes
- Clade: Angiosperms
- Clade: Monocots
- Clade: Commelinids
- Order: Commelinales
- Family: Philydraceae; Link

Genera
- Helmholtzia F.Muell.; Philydrella Caruel; Philydrum Banks ex Gaertn.

= Philydraceae =

Family of flowering plants

Philydraceae is a family of flowering plants composed of three genera and a total of six known species.

The 2016 APG IV system places the family in the monocot order Commelinales. It consists of perennial, tropical plants in Southeast Asia and Australia.
