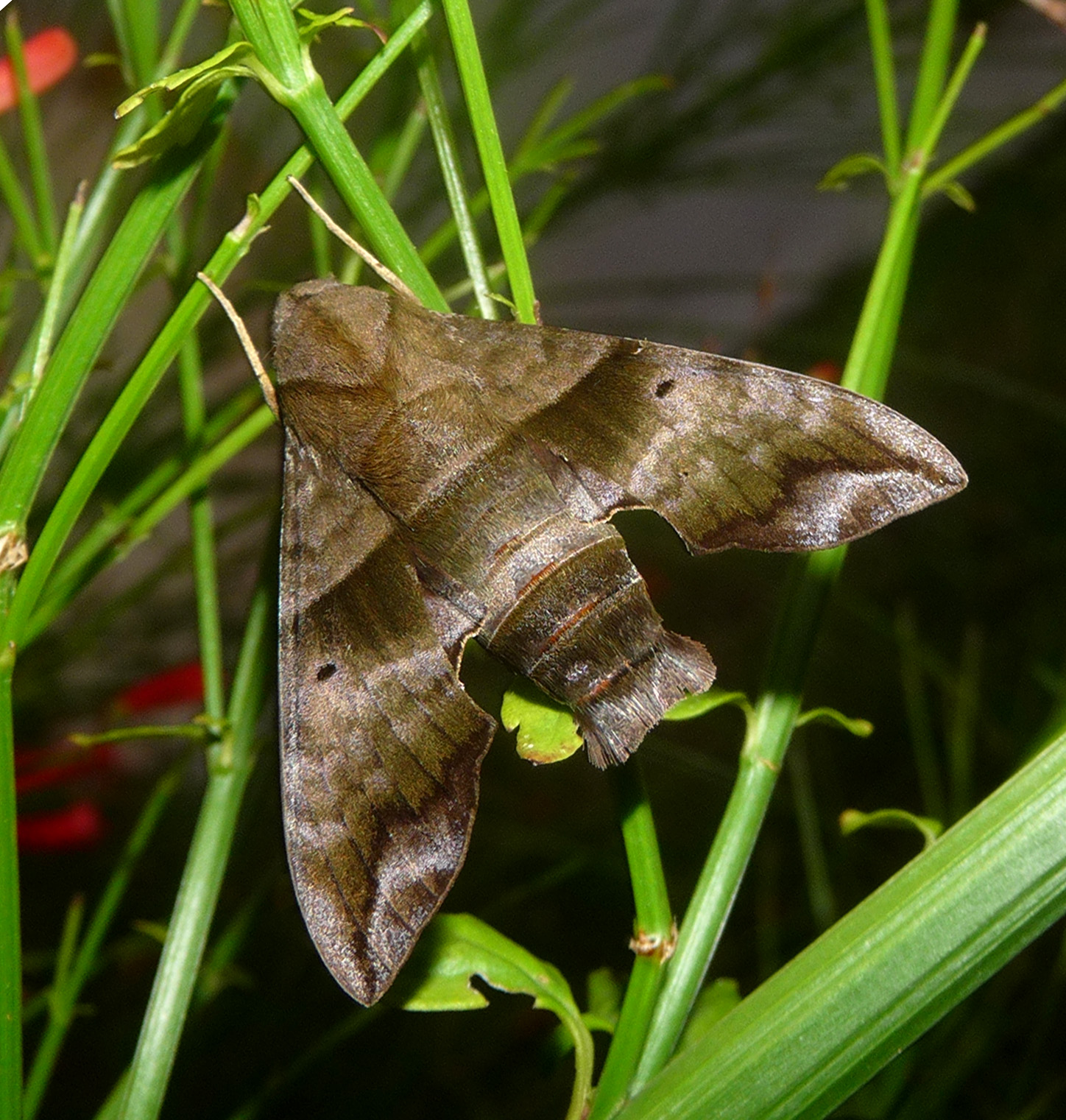

Conservation status
- Secure (NatureServe)

Scientific classification
- Kingdom: Animalia
- Phylum: Arthropoda
- Clade: Pancrustacea
- Class: Insecta
- Order: Lepidoptera
- Family: Sphingidae
- Genus: Perigonia
- Species: P. lusca

Binomial name
- Perigonia lusca (Fabricius, 1777)

Synonyms
- Sphinx lusca Fabricius, 1777; Stenolophia tenebrosa R. Felder, 1874; Perigonia restituta Walker, 1865; Perigonia interrupta Walker, 1865; Macroglossa doto Schaufuss, 1870; Perigonia lusca major Clark, 1928; Perigonia lusca bahamensis Clark, 1919; Macroglossa doto Schaufuss, 1870

= Perigonia lusca =

Half-blind sphinx

Species of moth

Perigonia lusca, the half-blind sphinx or coffee sphinx, is a moth of the family Sphingidae. It was first described by Johan Christian Fabricius in 1777.

== Distribution ==
It is found from the northern tip of South America, through most of Central America, and northward to Florida in the United States.

== Description ==
The wingspan is 55–65 mm.

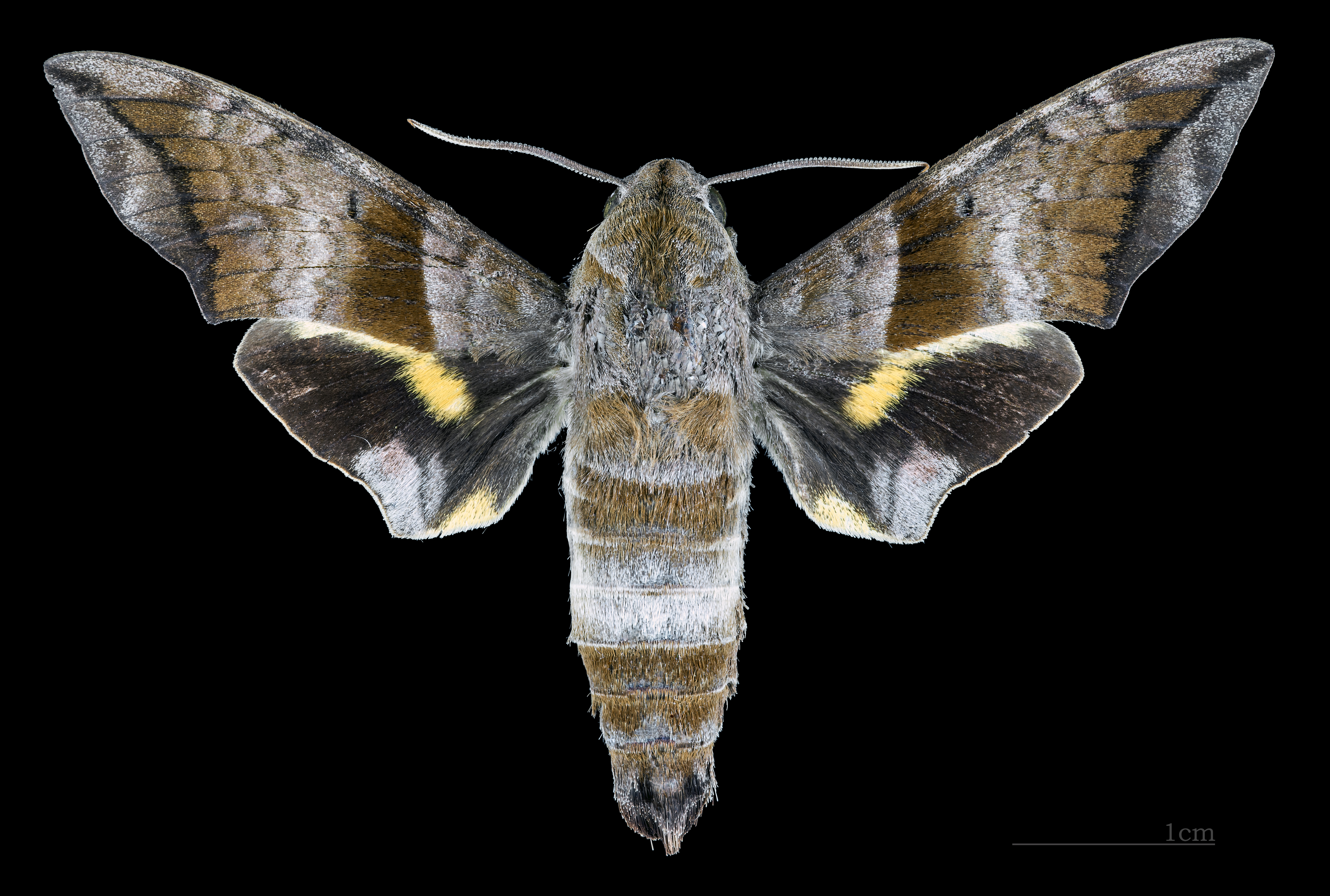
Male dorsal view

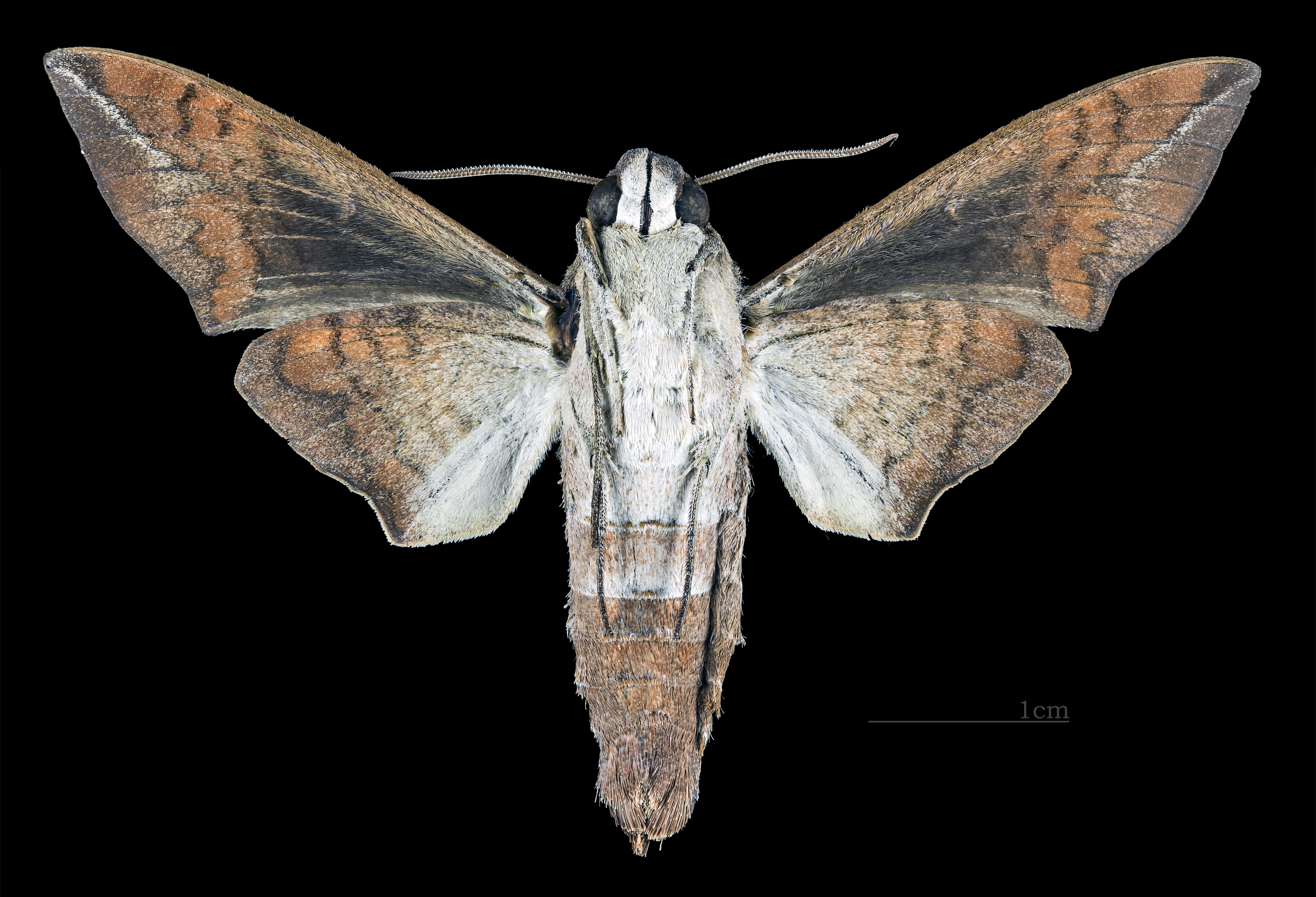
Male ventral view

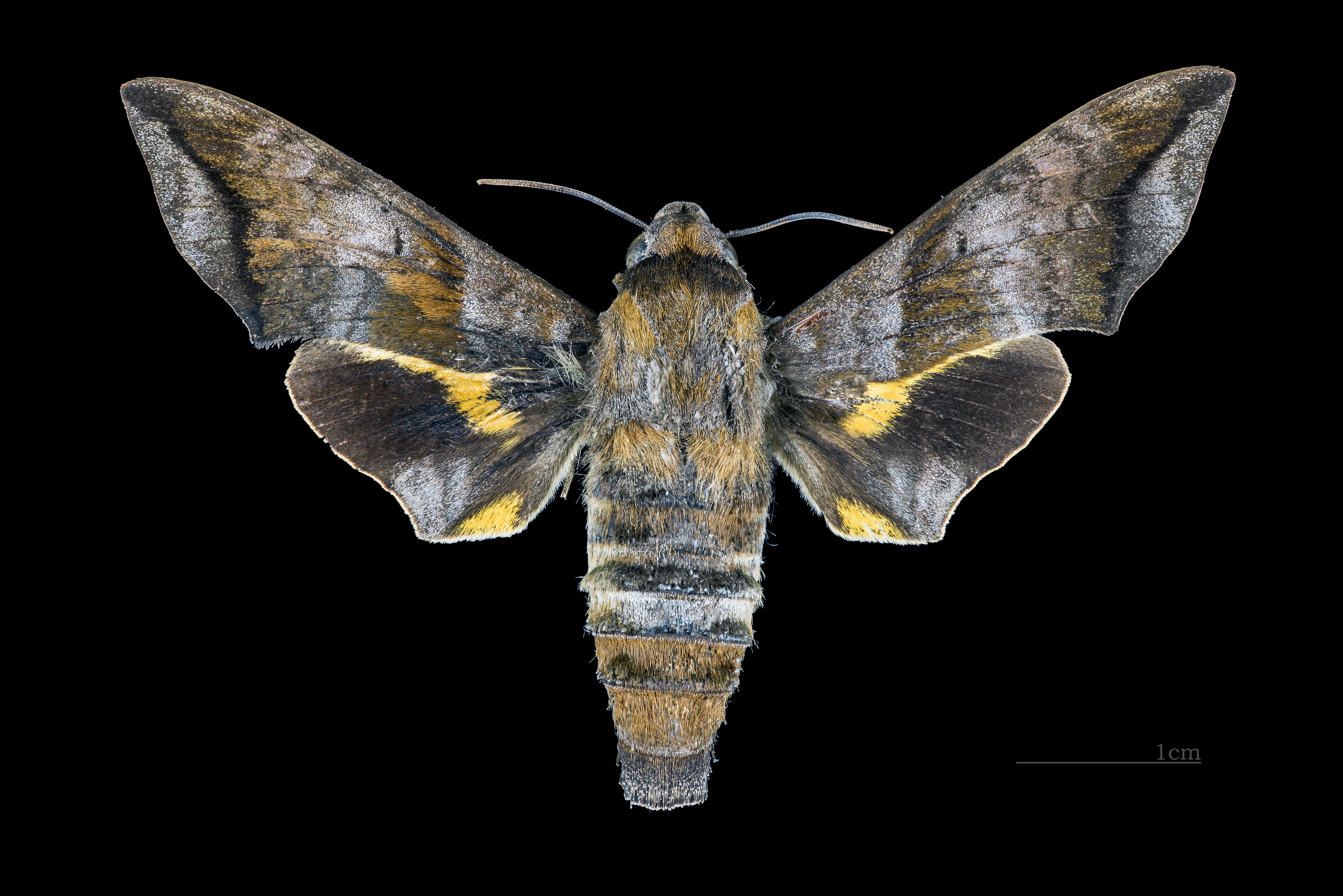
Female dorsal view

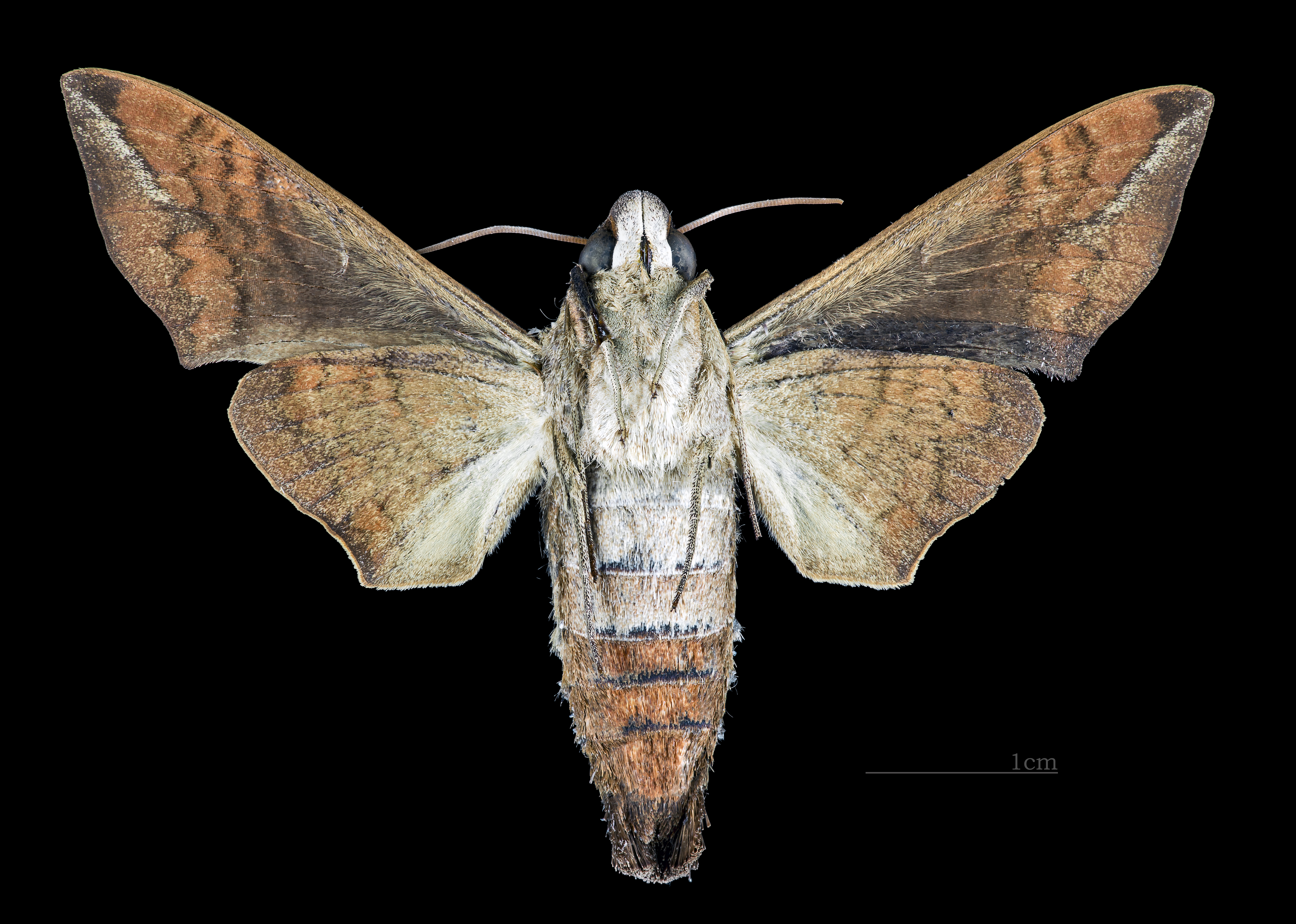
Female ventral view

== Biology ==
There are several generations per year in southern Florida. On the Galápagos Islands, adults are on wing in April and July. In the tropics, adults are probably on wing year round.

The larvae have been recorded feeding on Guettarda macrosperma, Guettarda scabra, Coffea species (including Coffea arabica), Ilex krugiana, Ilex paraguariensis, Genipa americana, Rondeletia, Gonzalagunia species (including Gonzalagunia spicata) and Cinchona succirubra.

== Subspecies and formes ==
- Perigonia lusca lusca (Mexico to Panama and Honduras, Venezuela, Paraguay, Argentina, Brazil, Bolivia, Bahamas, Cuba, Puerto Rico, St. Vincent, southern United States)
- Perigonia lusca continua Vázquez-G., 1959 (Revillagigedo Island and Soccoro Island in Mexico)
- Perigonia lusca f. interrupta Walker, 1875
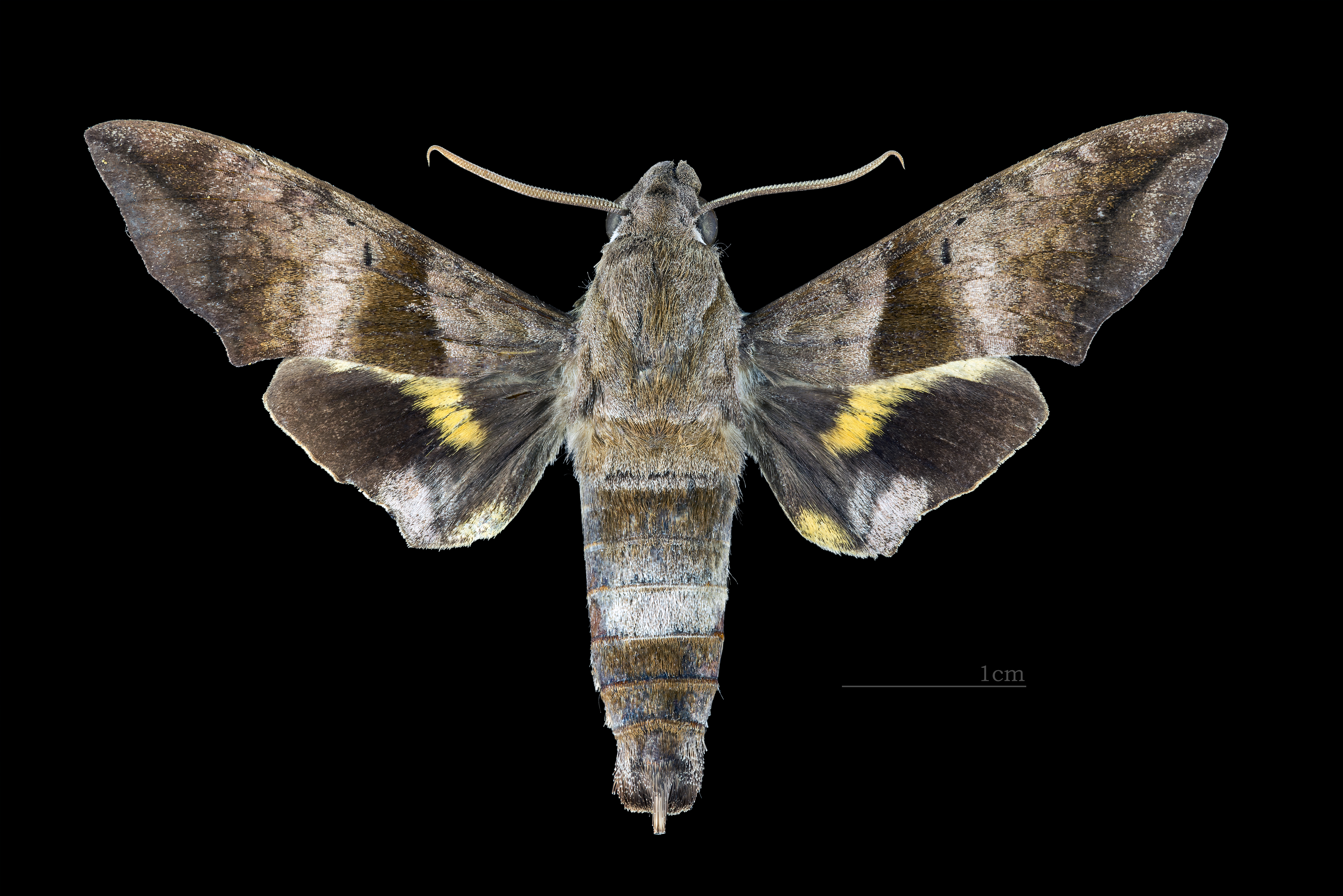
Perigonia lusca f. interrupta
Male dorsal view

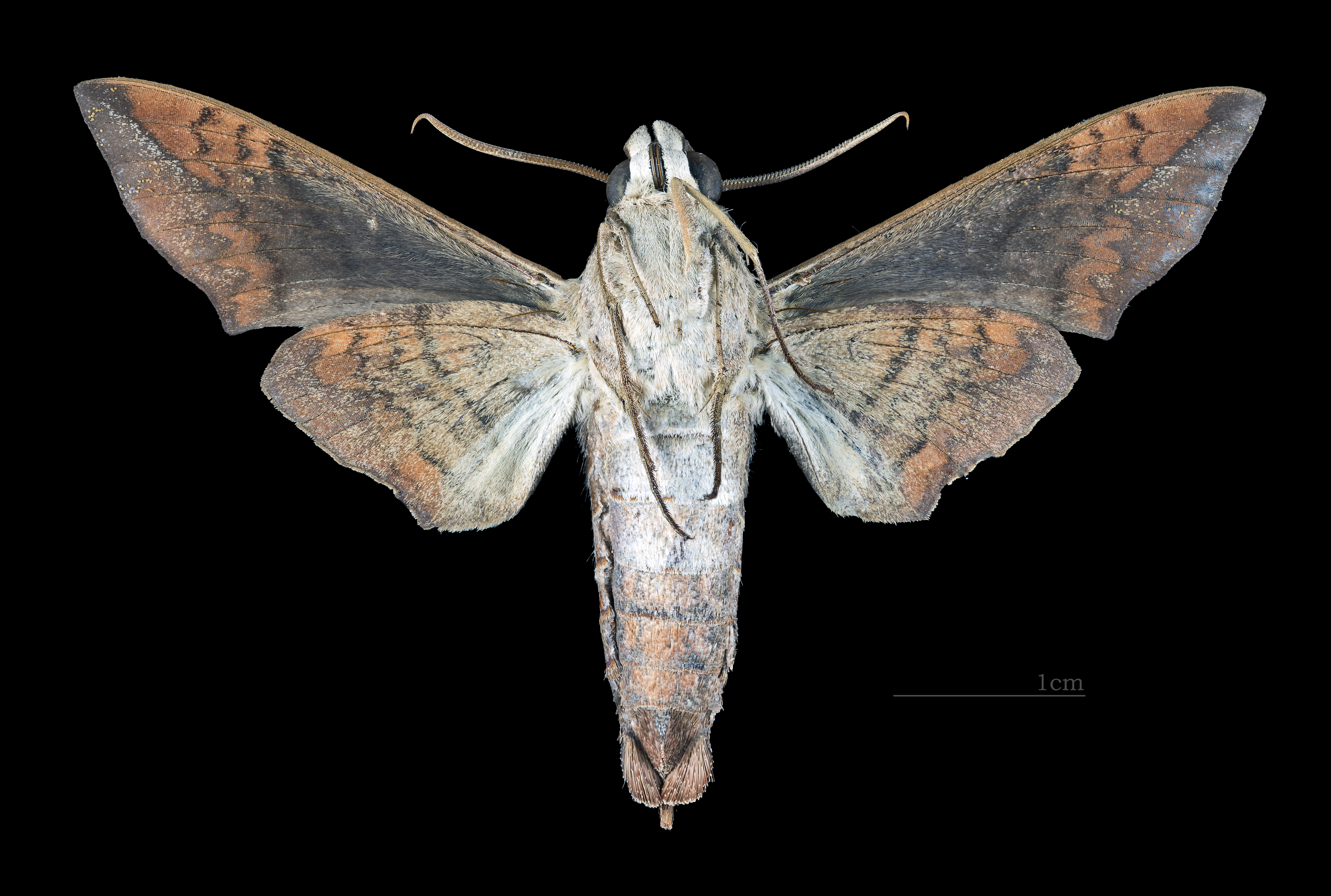
Perigonia lusca f. interrupta
Male ventral view

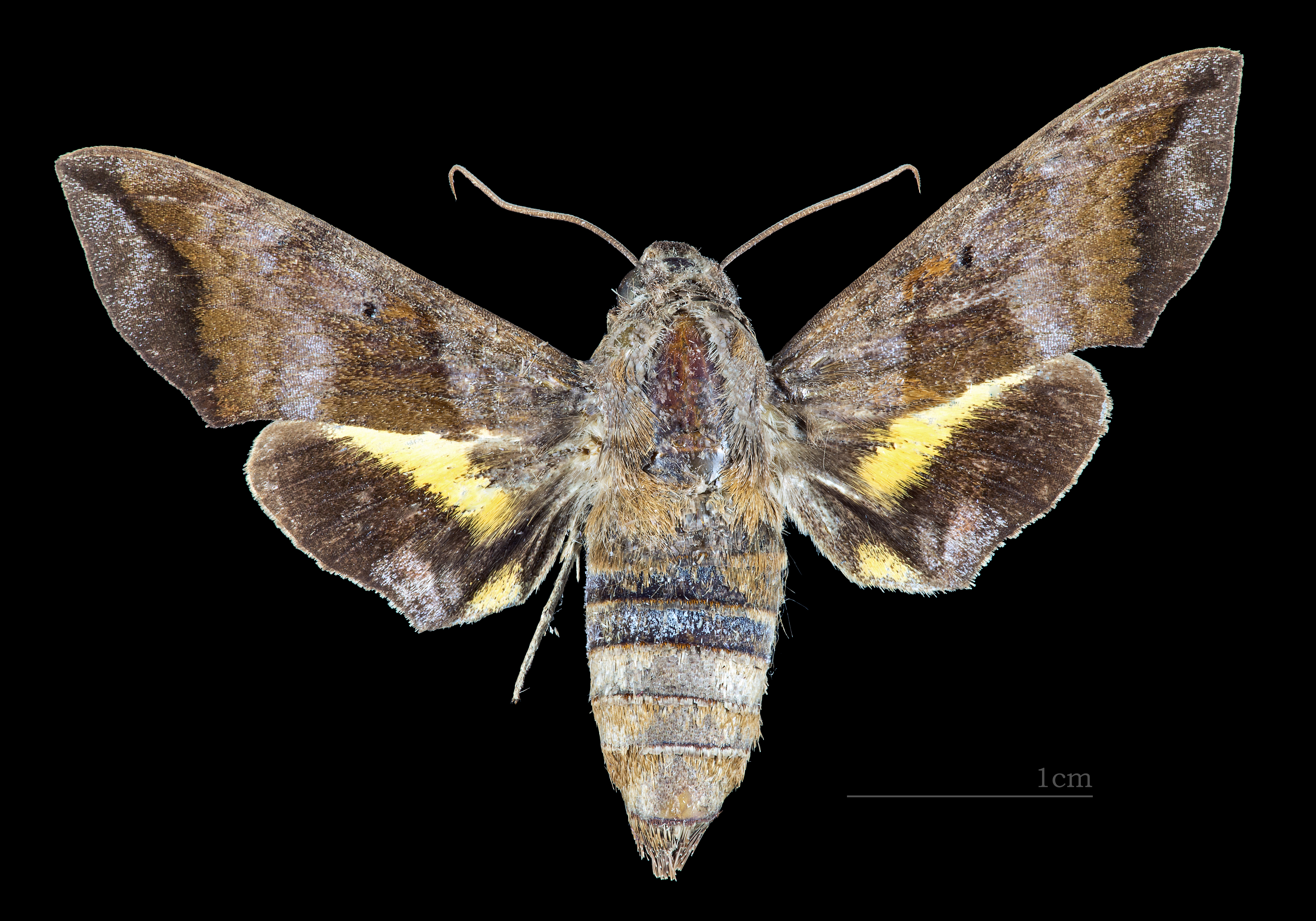
Perigonia lusca f. interrupta
Female dorsal view

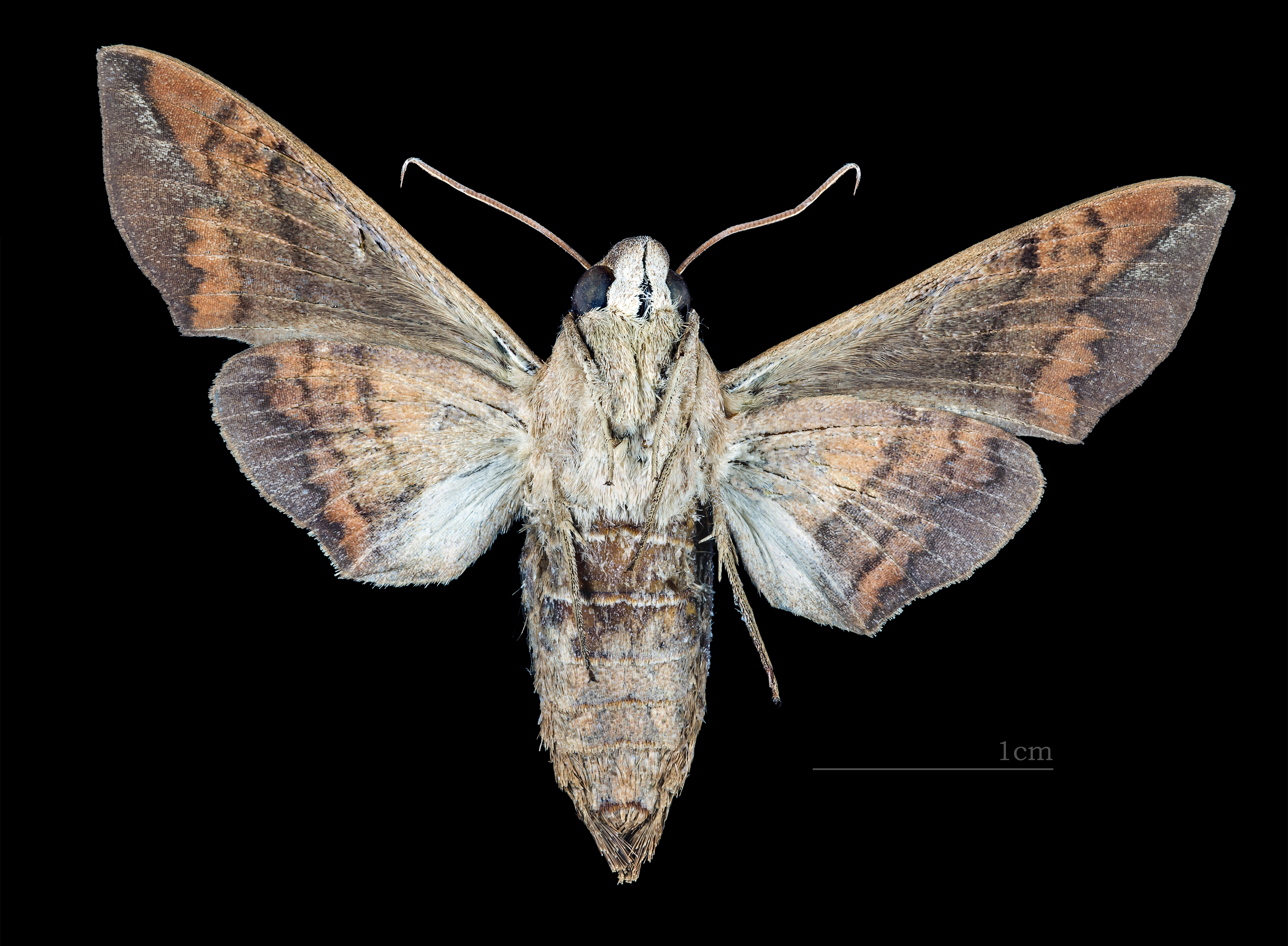
Perigonia lusca f. interrupta
Female ventral view
