= Panama Rose =

Panama Rose may refer to:

- Rondeletia odorata, the Panama Rose, an evergreen shrub from Panama and Cuba
- The pseudonym used by Ira Cohen's then-girlfriend Rosalind when she wrote The Hashish Cookbook in Tangier, Morocco (mid-1960s), which was later published by Cohen's Gnaoua Press (New York, 1966)
