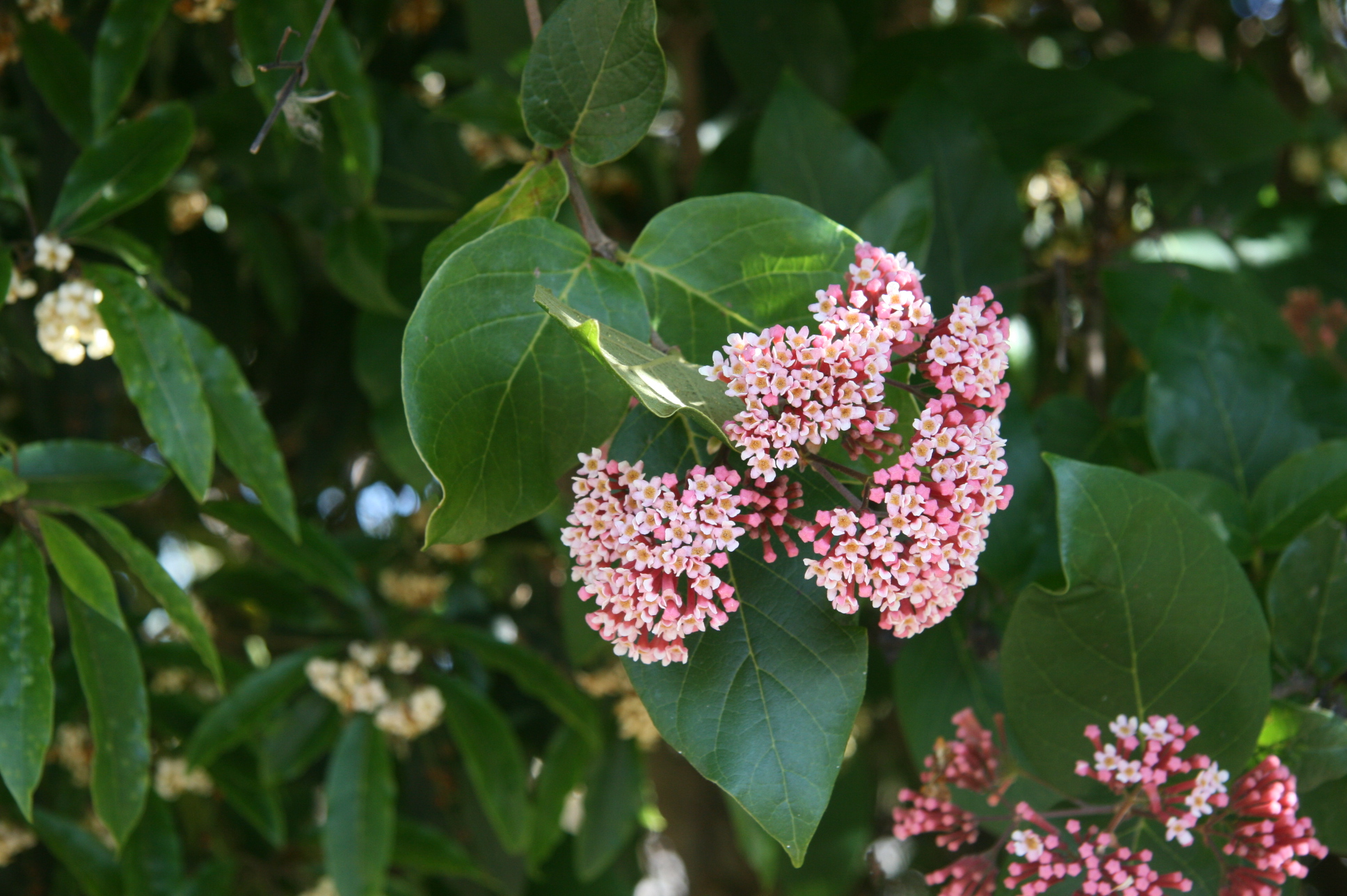

Scientific classification
- Kingdom: Plantae
- Clade: Tracheophytes
- Clade: Angiosperms
- Clade: Eudicots
- Clade: Asterids
- Order: Gentianales
- Family: Rubiaceae
- Genus: Rogiera
- Species: R. amoena

Binomial name
- Rogiera amoena Planch.

Synonyms
- List: Rondeletia amoena (Planch.) Hemsl. 1879.; Rogiera elegans Planch., 1849.; Rogiera langlassei (Standl.) 1982.; Rogiera latifolia (Oerst.) Decne., 1853.; Rogiera menechma Planch., 1849.; Rogiera pittieri (K.Schum. & K.Krause) Borhidi 1982.; Rogiera roezlii Planch., 1849.; Rogiera versicolor (Sm. ex Hook.) Lindl. & Paxton 1851-52.; Rondeletia langlassei Standl., 1918.; Rondeletia latifolia Oerst., 1852.; Rondeletia ligustroides Hemsl., 1879.; Rondeletia pittieri K.Schum. & K.Krause, 1908.; Rondeletia roezlii (Planch.) Hemsl., Rondeletia rugosa Benth. ex Oerst., 1852.; Rondeletia schumanniana K.Krause 1908.; Rondeletia versicolor Sm. ex Hook. 1851.

= Rogiera amoena =

Species of plant

Rogiera amoena (syn. Rondeletia amoena) is a shrub or small tree in the family Rubiaceae, sometimes grown as an ornamental plant. Common names include rondeletia and yellowthroat rondeletia. The species is native to Mexico, Belize, Guatemala, El Salvador, Nicaragua, Costa Rica and Panama.

French botanist Jules Émile Planchon described Rogiera amoena in 1849. It is the type species of the genus Rogiera. It was transferred to the genus Rondeletia in 1879 by William Hemsley in 1879.

The spring flowers of Rogiera amoena give it horticultural potential. It readily adapts to cultivation, growing in sun or part shade. Watering during dry periods is beneficial. It can be propagated by seed or semi-hardwood cuttings.
