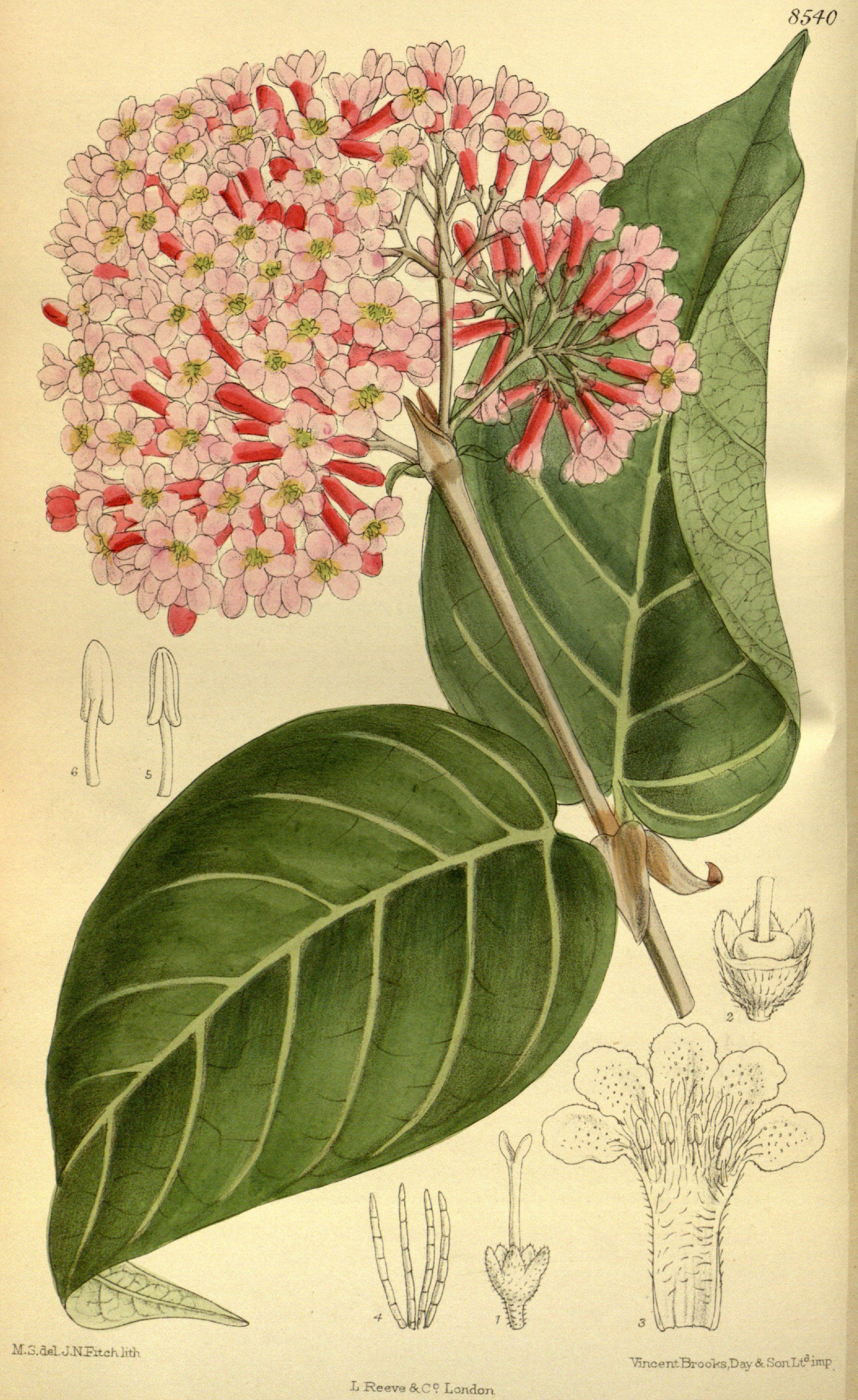
- Rogiera cordata

Scientific classification
- Kingdom: Plantae
- Clade: Tracheophytes
- Clade: Angiosperms
- Clade: Eudicots
- Clade: Asterids
- Order: Gentianales
- Family: Rubiaceae
- Subfamily: Cinchonoideae
- Tribe: Guettardeae
- Genus: Rogiera; Planch.

Type species
- Rogiera amoena Planch.

Synonyms
- None known

= Rogiera =

Genus of flowering plants

Rogiera is a genus of flowering plants in the family Rubiaceae. It has 15 species and its native range is from Mexico to Colombia.

Rogiera amoena, Rogiera cordata, and Rogiera gratissima are sometimes cultivated as ornamentals. The type species for the genus is Rogiera amoena.

Rogiera was named and published by Jules Émile Planchon in Flore des Serres et des Jardins de l'Europe (Fl. Serres Jard. Eur.) Vol.5 on page 442 in 1849. The name honours the Belgian politician Charles Latour Rogier (1800–1885), who was also Minister for the Interior and patron of horticulture.

Some authors have included Rogiera in a broadly defined Rondeletia, but molecular phylogenetic studies have shown that Rogiera is closer to Guettarda than to Rondeletia.

== Species ==
The following species list may be incomplete or contain synonyms;

- Rogiera amoena Planch.
- Rogiera backhouses (Hook.f.) Borhidi
- Rogiera breedlovei (Lorence) Borhidi
- Rogiera cordata (Benth.) Planch.
- Rogiera edwardsii (Standl.) Borhidi
- Rogiera gratissima Linden
- Rogiera ligustroides (Hemsl.) Borhidi
- Rogiera macdougallii (Lorence) Borhidi
- Rogiera nicaraguensis (Oerst.) Borhidi
- Rogiera oaxacensis Borhidi & K.Velasco
- Rogiera standleyana (Ant.Molina) Lorence
- Rogiera stenosiphon (Hemsl.) Borhidi
- Rogiera tabascensis Borhidi
