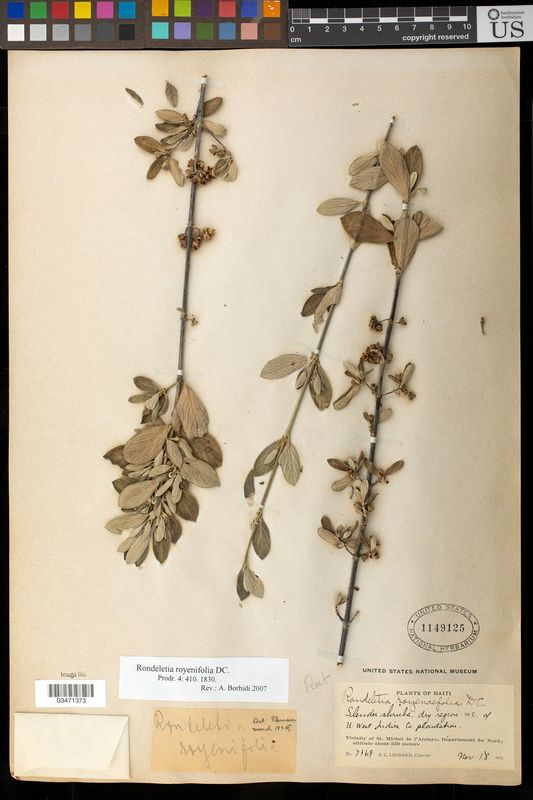

Conservation status
- Vulnerable (IUCN 3.1)

Scientific classification
- Kingdom: Plantae
- Clade: Embryophytes
- Clade: Tracheophytes
- Clade: Angiosperms
- Clade: Eudicots
- Clade: Asterids
- Order: Gentianales
- Family: Rubiaceae
- Genus: Rondeletia
- Species: R. roynaefolia

Binomial name
- Rondeletia roynaefolia DC.

= Rondeletia roynaefolia =

Species of flowering plant

Rondeletia roynaefolia (sometimes spelled Rondeletia royenaefolia or Rondeletia royenifolia) is a species of flowering plant in the family Rubiaceae. It is a shrub or tree native to Hispaniola. The species was described in 1830, and is listed as Vulnerable by the IUCN.

== Taxonomy ==
The species was described by Augustin Pyramus de Candolle in 1830.

== Distribution ==
Rondeletia roynaefolia is native to the wet tropical biome of Hispaniola (the Dominican Republic and Haiti). It grows in lowland and submontane regions, and subtropical forests, at elevations of 200–1,200 metres (660–3,940 ft). The species has an extent of occurrence of around 11,819 square kilometres (4,563 sq mi).

== Description ==
Rondeletia roynaefolia is a large shrub or small tree that grows up to 4 metres (13 ft) high.

== Conservation ==
In 2023, the IUCN assessed Rondeletia roynaefolia as Vulnerable. The population is thought to be in decline. The species is threatened by agriculture, development, and harvesting for wood.

Rondeletia roynaefolia is present in protected areas of the Dominican Republic.

== Nomenclature ==
In Spanish, the species is known as Cuabilla.
