= Guettarda comata =

Conservation status
- Vulnerable (IUCN 2.3)

Scientific classification
- Kingdom: Plantae
- Clade: Tracheophytes
- Clade: Angiosperms
- Clade: Eudicots
- Clade: Asterids
- Order: Gentianales
- Family: Rubiaceae
- Genus: Guettarda
- Species: G. comata

Binomial name
- Guettarda comata Standl.

Species of plant

Guettarda comata is a species of plant in the family Rubiaceae. The type was collected in Department of Loreto, Peru. This species occurs also in Colombia (Quindío, Risararda).
