= Rondeletia fortunensis =

Scientific classification
- Kingdom: Plantae
- Clade: Embryophytes
- Clade: Tracheophytes
- Clade: Spermatophytes
- Clade: Angiosperms
- Clade: Eudicots
- Clade: Asterids
- Order: Gentianales
- Family: Rubiaceae
- Genus: Rondeletia
- Species: R. fortunensis

Binomial name
- Rondeletia fortunensis Borhidi

Species of flowering plant

Rondeletia fortunensis is a species of flowering plant in the family Rubiaceae. It is native to Cuba, and was described in 2008.

== Taxonomy ==
The species was described by Attila Borhidi in 2008.

== Distribution ==
Rondeletia fortunensis is native to the wet tropical biome of Cuba.
