= Guettarda retusa =

Conservation status
- Extinct (1869) (IUCN 3.1)

Scientific classification
- Kingdom: Plantae
- Clade: Tracheophytes
- Clade: Angiosperms
- Clade: Eudicots
- Clade: Asterids
- Order: Gentianales
- Family: Rubiaceae
- Genus: Guettarda
- Species: †G. retusa

Binomial name
- †Guettarda retusa Wr.

Species of plant

Guettarda retusa, also called cuero, is an extinct species of plant in the family Rubiaceae that was endemic to two separate locations in Pinar del Río Province, Cuba. It became extinct due to habitat loss.
