= Rondeletia anguillensis =

Conservation status
- Critically Endangered (IUCN 3.1)

Scientific classification
- Kingdom: Plantae
- Clade: Tracheophytes
- Clade: Angiosperms
- Clade: Eudicots
- Clade: Asterids
- Order: Gentianales
- Family: Rubiaceae
- Genus: Rondeletia
- Species: R. anguillensis

Binomial name
- Rondeletia anguillensis R.A.Howard & E.A.Kellogg

Species of flowering plant

Rondeletia anguillensis, commonly known as the Anguilla bush, is a species of flowering plant in the family Rubiaceae. It is a shrub with pale pink flowers and capsule fruits. The species is native to Anguilla.

Rondeletia anguillensis was described in 1987, and is listed as Critically Endangered by the IUCN.

== Taxonomy ==
Rondeletia anguillensis was described by Richard A. Howard and Elizabeth Anne Kellogg in 1987.

== Distribution ==
Rondeletia anguillensis is native to the wet tropical biome of north-west Anguilla. Its estimated extent of occurrence is 11 square kilometres (4.2 sq mi). The species grows on limestone bedrock at elevations of 11–50 metres (36–164 ft).

Rondeletia anguillensis is the only plant species known to be endemic to Anguilla.

== Description ==
Rondeletia anguillensis is a shrub that grows up to 1 metre (3.3 ft) high. The bark is smooth and greyish.

The leaf stems are 0.2–0.5 millimetres (0.0079–0.0197 in) long. The leaves are ovate to elliptical, 1.5–3.8 millimetres (0.059–0.150 in) long, and 1.2–2.7 millimetres (0.047–0.106 in) wide.

The flowers are in four parts. The calyx is bell-shaped, green, 1.5–2.8 millimetres (0.059–0.110 in) long, and has lobes. The lobes are 0.7–1.1 millimetres (0.028–0.043 in) long. The corolla is pale pink, salverform, and has 0.8–1.6 millimetres (0.031–0.063 in) long lobes. The corolla tube is 4–5.7 millimetres (0.16–0.22 in) long in short-styled plants, and 3.2–3.7 millimetres (0.13–0.15 in) long in long-styled ones.

The fruit is a globose capsule measuring 1.8–2.9 millimetres (0.071–0.114 in) in diameter. The seeds are 0.72–0.75 millimetres (0.028–0.030 in) long.

== Conservation ==
In 2014, the IUCN assessed Rondeletia anguillensis as Critically Endangered. It is threatened by urban development, feral goats, and the invasive Leucaena leucocephala. The species is not found in protected areas.

Around 5,131 individual plants are left in the wild.
