= Rondeletia exasperata =

Scientific classification
- Kingdom: Plantae
- Clade: Embryophytes
- Clade: Tracheophytes
- Clade: Spermatophytes
- Clade: Angiosperms
- Clade: Eudicots
- Clade: Asterids
- Order: Gentianales
- Family: Rubiaceae
- Genus: Rondeletia
- Species: R. exasperata

Binomial name
- Rondeletia exasperata Borhidi

Species of flowering plant

Rondeletia exasperata is a species of flowering plant in the family Rubiaceae. It is a shrub native to the Dominican Republic.

== Taxonomy ==
Rondeletia exasperata was described by Attila Borhidi in 1983. The type material was collected by Henri Alain Liogier.

== Distribution ==
Rondeletia exasperata is native to the wet tropical biome of the Dominican Republic.
