= Rondeletia anomala =

Scientific classification
- Kingdom: Plantae
- Clade: Tracheophytes
- Clade: Angiosperms
- Clade: Eudicots
- Clade: Asterids
- Order: Gentianales
- Family: Rubiaceae
- Genus: Rondeletia
- Species: R. anomala

Binomial name
- Rondeletia anomala Veitch

Species of flowering plant

Rondeletia anomala is a species of flowering plant in the family Rubiaceae. It is a shrub native to Guatemala, and was described in 1856.

== Taxonomy ==
The species was described by John Gould Veitch in 1856.

== Distribution ==
Rondeletia anomala is native to the wet tropical biome of Guatemala.

== Description ==
Rondeletia anomala is a shrub.
