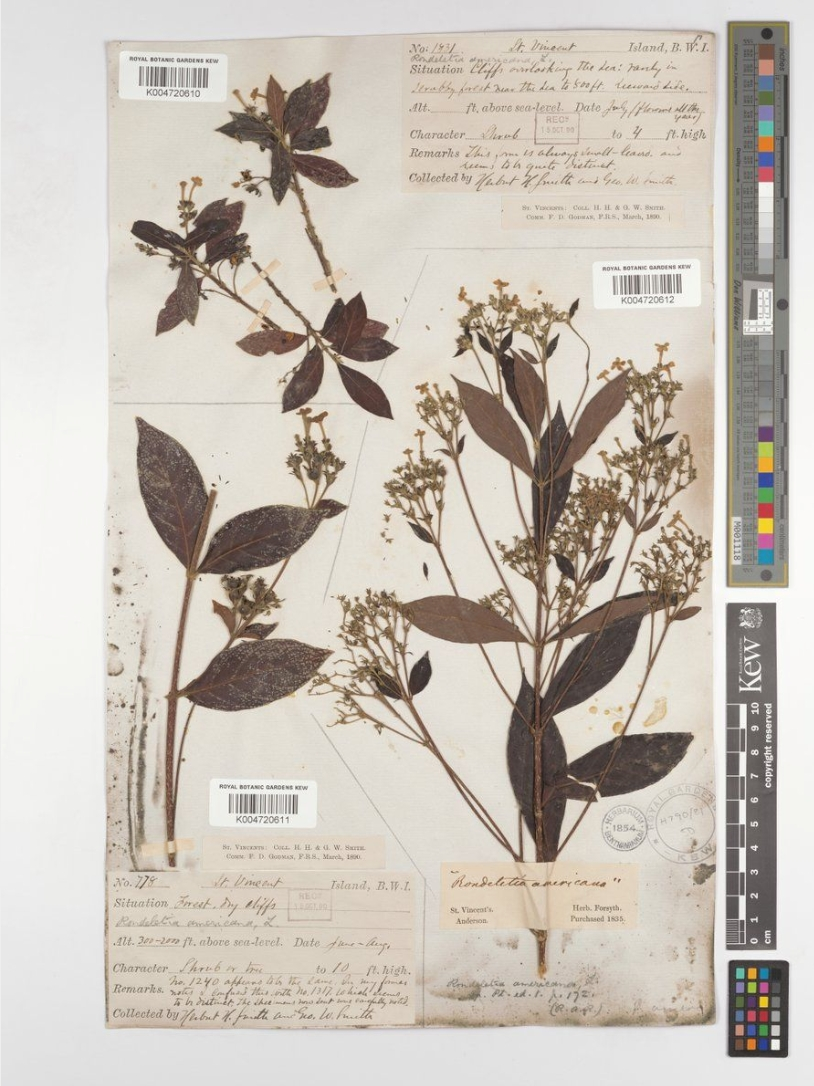

Scientific classification
- Kingdom: Plantae
- Clade: Embryophytes
- Clade: Tracheophytes
- Clade: Spermatophytes
- Clade: Angiosperms
- Clade: Eudicots
- Clade: Asterids
- Order: Gentianales
- Family: Rubiaceae
- Genus: Rondeletia
- Species: R. americana

Binomial name
- Rondeletia americana L.

Synonyms
- Rondeletia dichotoma Pers.

= Rondeletia americana =

Species of flowering plant

Rondeletia americana is a species of flowering plant in the family Rubiaceae. It is a shrub with dark green leaves and a white corolla.

The species is native to Saint Vincent, and was first described in 1753.

== Taxonomy ==
Rondeletia americana was first described by Carl Linnaeus, in the 1753 book Species Plantarum. In 1929, it was designated as the type species of Rondeletia.

== Distribution ==
Rondeletia americana is native to the wet tropical biome of Saint Vincent.

== Description ==
Rondeletia americana is a shrub with slender branches.

The leaves are dark green, elliptic-oblong or oblong-obovate, 6.5–10 centimetres (2.6–3.9 in) long, and 2–4 centimetres (0.79–1.57 in) wide. The leaves have 3–4 millimetres (0.12–0.16 in) stems.

The inflorescence has many flowers. The flowers have short stems, or lack stalks. The floral cup has thin hairs. The calyx has five lobes. The corolla is white, and silky, with appressed hairs on the outside.

The fruit is a spherical capsule, around 3 millimetres (0.12 in) in diameter.
