= Rondeletia apiculata =

Scientific classification
- Kingdom: Plantae
- Clade: Tracheophytes
- Clade: Angiosperms
- Clade: Eudicots
- Clade: Asterids
- Order: Gentianales
- Family: Rubiaceae
- Genus: Rondeletia
- Species: R. apiculata

Binomial name
- Rondeletia apiculata Urb.

Synonyms
- Rondeletia apiculata var. norlindii (Urb.) Borhidi; Rondeletia norlindii Urb.

Species of flowering plant

Rondeletia apiculata is a species of flowering plant in the family Rubiaceae. It is a shrub native to Cuba, and was described in 1923.

== Taxonomy ==
The species was described by Ignatz Urban in 1923.

== Distribution ==
Rondeletia apiculata is native to the wet tropical biome of eastern Cuba.

== Description ==
Rondeletia apiculata is a shrub.
