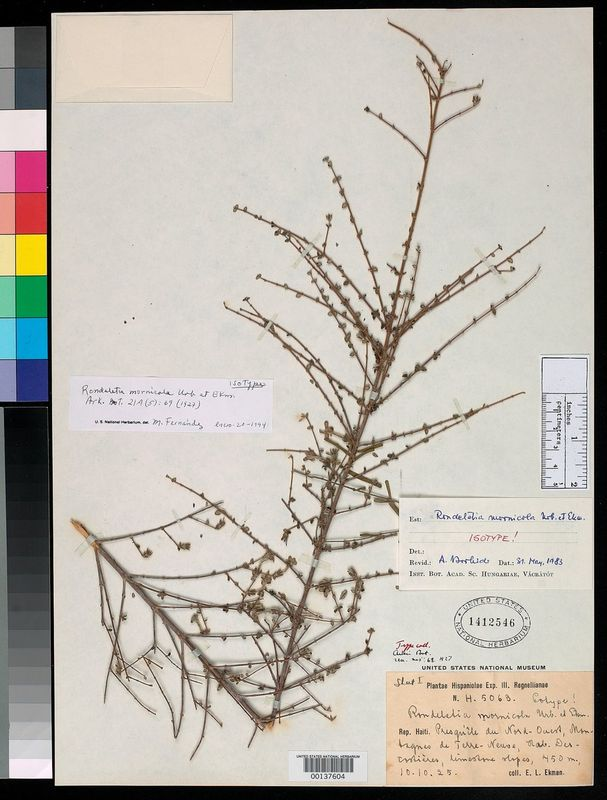

Conservation status
- Critically Endangered (IUCN 3.1)

Scientific classification
- Kingdom: Plantae
- Clade: Embryophytes
- Clade: Tracheophytes
- Clade: Angiosperms
- Clade: Eudicots
- Clade: Asterids
- Order: Gentianales
- Family: Rubiaceae
- Genus: Rondeletia
- Species: R. mornicola

Binomial name
- Rondeletia mornicola Urb. & Ekman

= Rondeletia mornicola =

Species of flowering plant

Rondeletia mornicola is a species of flowering plant in the family Rubiaceae. It is a shrub native to Haiti. The species was described in 1927, and is listed as Critically Endangered by the IUCN.

== Taxonomy ==
The species was described by Ignatz Urban and Erik Leonard Ekman in 1927.

== Distribution ==
Rondeletia mornicola is native to the wet tropical biome of Haiti. It is known only from the type locality, in northwestern Haiti.

The species is found in subtropical moist forests, at elevations of 400–500 metres (1,300–1,600 ft). It grows in soils derived from limestone.

== Description ==
Rondeletia mornicola is a shrub that grows up to 1 metre (3.3 ft) high.

== Uses ==
The wood is used for fuel.

== Conservation ==
In 2020, the IUCN assessed Rondeletia mornicola as Critically Endangered. The species is threatened by habitat loss, and its population is thought to be declining.

Rondeletia mornicola is not known from any protected areas.
