= Rondeletia acunae =

Scientific classification
- Kingdom: Plantae
- Clade: Tracheophytes
- Clade: Angiosperms
- Clade: Eudicots
- Clade: Asterids
- Order: Gentianales
- Family: Rubiaceae
- Genus: Rondeletia
- Species: R. acunae

Binomial name
- Rondeletia acunae Borhidi & M.Fernández

Species of flowering plant

Rondeletia acunae is a species of flowering plant in the family Rubiaceae. It is a shrub native to Cuba, and was described in 1985.

== Taxonomy ==
The species was described by Attila Borhidi and Mayra Fernández in 1985.

== Distribution ==
Rondeletia acunae is native to the wet tropical biome of Cuba.

== Description ==
Rondeletia acunae is a shrub.
