= Rondeletia harrisii =

Conservation status
- Near Threatened (IUCN 2.3)

Scientific classification
- Kingdom: Plantae
- Clade: Tracheophytes
- Clade: Angiosperms
- Clade: Eudicots
- Clade: Asterids
- Order: Gentianales
- Family: Rubiaceae
- Genus: Rondeletia
- Species: R. harrisii

Binomial name
- Rondeletia harrisii Urb.

Species of plant

Rondeletia harrisii is a species of plant in the family Rubiaceae. It is endemic to Jamaica.

== Sources ==
- World Conservation Monitoring Centre (1998). "Rondeletia harrisii". IUCN Red List of Threatened Species. 1998 e.T36010A9972771. doi:10.2305/IUCN.UK.1998.RLTS.T36010A9972771.en.
