= Guettarda frangulifolia =

Conservation status
- Vulnerable (IUCN 2.3)

Scientific classification
- Kingdom: Plantae
- Clade: Tracheophytes
- Clade: Angiosperms
- Clade: Eudicots
- Clade: Asterids
- Order: Gentianales
- Family: Rubiaceae
- Genus: Guettarda
- Species: G. frangulifolia

Binomial name
- Guettarda frangulifolia Urb.

Species of plant

Guettarda frangulifolia is a species of plant in the family Rubiaceae. It is endemic to Jamaica.
