= Rondeletia portlandensis =

Conservation status
- Vulnerable (IUCN 2.3)

Scientific classification
- Kingdom: Plantae
- Clade: Tracheophytes
- Clade: Angiosperms
- Clade: Eudicots
- Clade: Asterids
- Order: Gentianales
- Family: Rubiaceae
- Genus: Rondeletia
- Species: R. portlandensis

Binomial name
- Rondeletia portlandensis Proctor

Species of plant

Rondeletia portlandensis is a species of plant in the family Rubiaceae. It is endemic to Jamaica. It is threatened by habitat loss.
