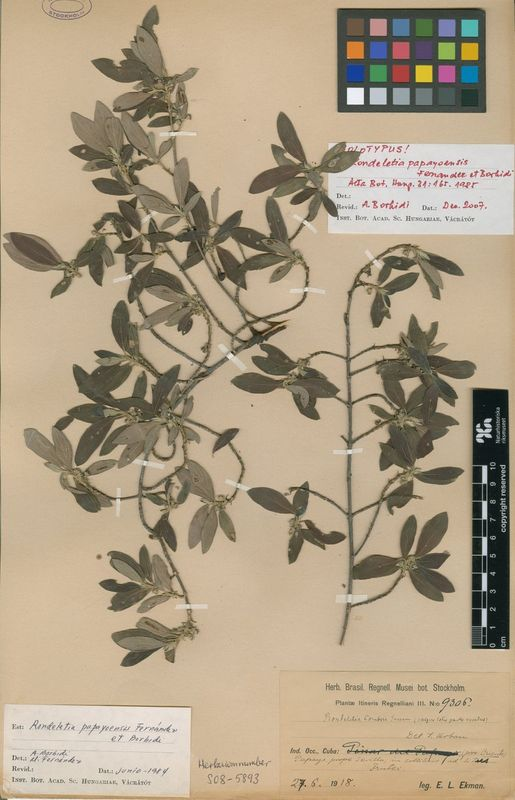

Scientific classification
- Kingdom: Plantae
- Clade: Embryophytes
- Clade: Tracheophytes
- Clade: Angiosperms
- Clade: Eudicots
- Clade: Asterids
- Order: Gentianales
- Family: Rubiaceae
- Genus: Rondeletia
- Species: R. papayoensis

Binomial name
- Rondeletia papayoensis M.Fernández & Borhidi

= Rondeletia papayoensis =

Species of flowering plant

Rondeletia papayoensis is a species of flowering plant in the family Rubiaceae. It is a shrub native to Cuba, that was described in 1985.

== Taxonomy ==
The species was described by Mayra Fernández and Attila Borhidi in 1985.

== Distribution ==
Rondeletia papayoensis is native to the wet tropical biome of Cuba.

== Description ==
Rondeletia papayoensis is a shrub.
