= Guettarda ochreata =

Conservation status
- Near Threatened (IUCN 2.3)

Scientific classification
- Kingdom: Plantae
- Clade: Tracheophytes
- Clade: Angiosperms
- Clade: Eudicots
- Clade: Asterids
- Order: Gentianales
- Family: Rubiaceae
- Genus: Guettarda
- Species: G. ochreata

Binomial name
- Guettarda ochreata Schltdl.

Species of plant

Guettarda ochreata is a species of plant in the family Rubiaceae. It is endemic to Peru.
