= Rogiera gratissima =

Scientific classification
- Kingdom: Plantae
- Clade: Tracheophytes
- Clade: Angiosperms
- Clade: Eudicots
- Clade: Asterids
- Order: Gentianales
- Family: Rubiaceae
- Genus: Rogiera
- Species: R. gratissima

Binomial name
- Rogiera gratissima Linden ex Planch.

Synonyms
- Rondeletia gratissima (Linden) Hemsl.; Rogiera ehrenbergii (K.Schum. ex Standl.) Borhidi; Rogiera elegantissima Regel; Rogiera seleriana (Loes.) Borhidi; Rondeletia ehrenbergii K.Schum. ex Standl.; Rondeletia seleriana Loes.

Species of plant

Rogiera gratissima is an ornamental plant in the family Rubiaceae. It is native to Guatemala, Honduras, and Mexico.
