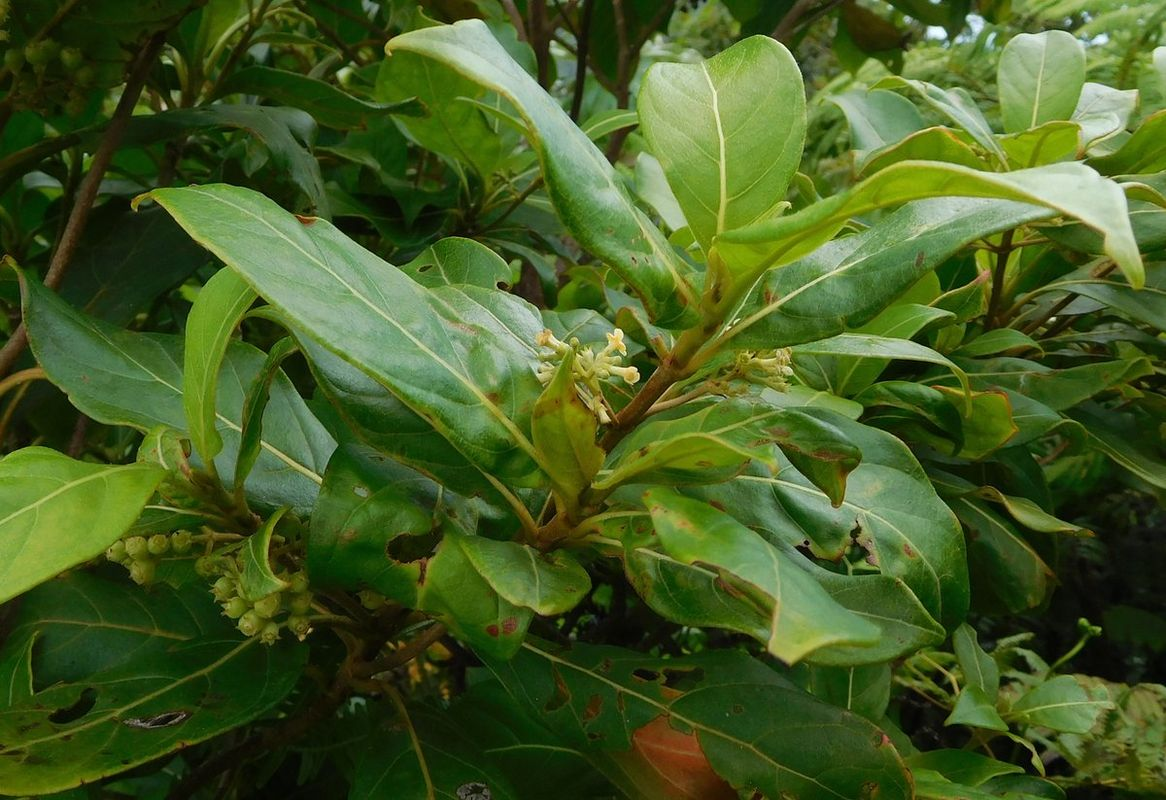

Scientific classification
- Kingdom: Plantae
- Clade: Embryophytes
- Clade: Tracheophytes
- Clade: Angiosperms
- Clade: Eudicots
- Clade: Asterids
- Order: Gentianales
- Family: Rubiaceae
- Genus: Rondeletia
- Species: R. parviflora

Binomial name
- Rondeletia parviflora Poir.

Synonyms
- Rondeletia arborescens Griseb.; Rondeletia stereocarpa Griseb.

= Rondeletia parviflora =

Species of flowering plant

Rondeletia parviflora is a species of flowering plant in the family Rubiaceae. It is a shrub or tree native to the Lesser Antilles, that was described in 1804.

== Taxonomy ==
The species was described by Jean Louis Marie Poiret in 1804.

== Distribution ==
Rondeletia parviflora is native to the wet tropical biome of the Leeward Islands and Windward Islands, in the Lesser Antilles.

== Description ==
Rondeletia parviflora is a shrub or tree.

== Nomenclature ==
In Franch, the species is known as Résolu montagne.
