= Rondeletia alaternoides =

- Rondeletia alaternoides subsp. alaternoides

Scientific classification
- Kingdom: Plantae
- Clade: Tracheophytes
- Clade: Angiosperms
- Clade: Eudicots
- Clade: Asterids
- Order: Gentianales
- Family: Rubiaceae
- Genus: Rondeletia
- Species: R. alaternoides

Binomial name
- Rondeletia alaternoides A.Rich.

Subspecies
- Rondeletia alaternoides subsp. alaternoides; Rondeletia alaternoides subsp. brachyloba M.Fernández & Borhidi; Rondeletia alaternoides subsp. myrtacea (Standl.) M.Fernández & Borhidi

Species of flowering plant

Rondeletia alaternoides is a species of flowering plant in the family Rubiaceae. It is a shrub native to Cuba. The species was described in 1850, and has three subspecies.

== Taxonomy ==
The species was described by Achille Richard in 1850.

Three subspecies are recognised:

- Rondeletia alaternoides subsp. alaternoides - native to eastern Cuba
- Rondeletia alaternoides subsp. brachyloba M.Fernández & Borhidi - native to Cuba
- Rondeletia alaternoides subsp. myrtacea (Standl.) M.Fernández & Borhidi - native to Cuba

== Distribution ==
Rondeletia alaternoides is native to the wet tropical biome of Cuba.

== Description ==
Rondeletia alaternoides is a shrub.
