= Rondeletia pallida =

Conservation status
- Vulnerable (IUCN 2.3)

Scientific classification
- Kingdom: Plantae
- Clade: Tracheophytes
- Clade: Angiosperms
- Clade: Eudicots
- Clade: Asterids
- Order: Gentianales
- Family: Rubiaceae
- Genus: Rondeletia
- Species: R. pallida

Binomial name
- Rondeletia pallida Britton

Species of plant

Rondeletia pallida is a species of plant in the family Rubiaceae. It is endemic to Jamaica. It is threatened by habitat loss.

== Sources ==
- World Conservation Monitoring Centre (1998). "Rondeletia pallida". IUCN Red List of Threatened Species. 1998 e.T36013A9973164. doi:10.2305/IUCN.UK.1998.RLTS.T36013A9973164.en.
