= Guettarda longiflora =

Conservation status
- Critically Endangered (IUCN 2.3)

Scientific classification
- Kingdom: Plantae
- Clade: Tracheophytes
- Clade: Angiosperms
- Clade: Eudicots
- Clade: Asterids
- Order: Gentianales
- Family: Rubiaceae
- Genus: Guettarda
- Species: G. longiflora

Binomial name
- Guettarda longiflora Griseb.

Synonyms
- Matthiola longiflora (Griseb.) Kuntze

Species of plant

Guettarda longiflora is a species of plant in the family Rubiaceae. It is endemic to Jamaica. It is threatened by habitat loss.
