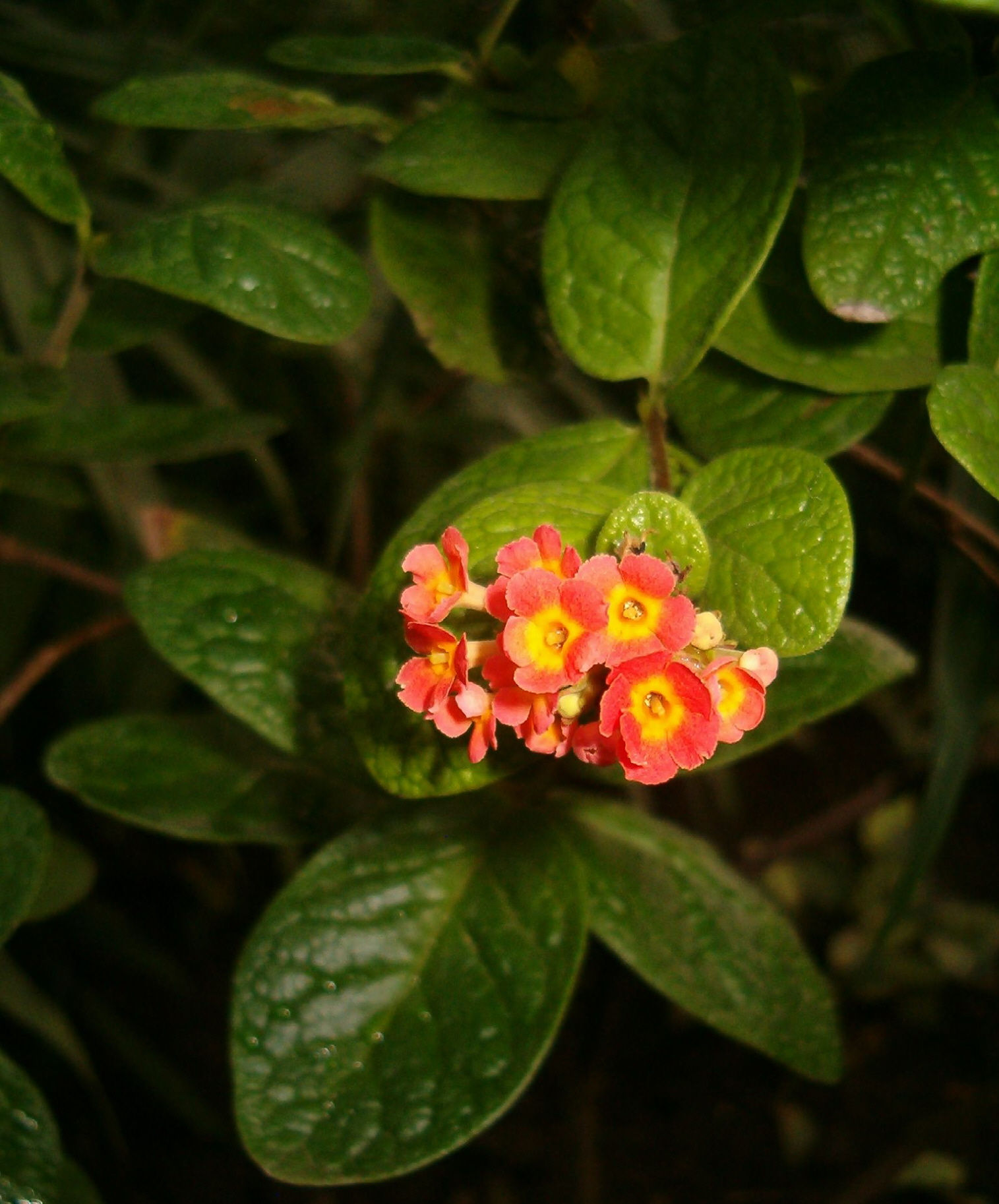

Scientific classification
- Kingdom: Plantae
- Clade: Embryophytes
- Clade: Tracheophytes
- Clade: Spermatophytes
- Clade: Angiosperms
- Clade: Eudicots
- Clade: Asterids
- Order: Gentianales
- Family: Rubiaceae
- Genus: Rondeletia
- Species: R. odorata

Binomial name
- Rondeletia odorata Jacq.

= Rondeletia odorata =

Species of plant

Rondeletia odorata is a species of flowering plant in the coffee family. It is native to Cuba and Panama. It is cultivated elsewhere. Common names include rondeletia, Cleveland Sunrise, and Panama-rose.

This plant is a shrub or small tree growing up to 2 meters tall. The rough, leathery leaves are oppositely arranged and measure up to 5 centimeters long. The inflorescence is a cluster of several five-lobed flowers in shades of bright red with yellow throats.

There are three subspecies, Rondeletia odorata subsp. bullata, R. o. subsp. grandifolia, and R. o. subsp. odorata.
