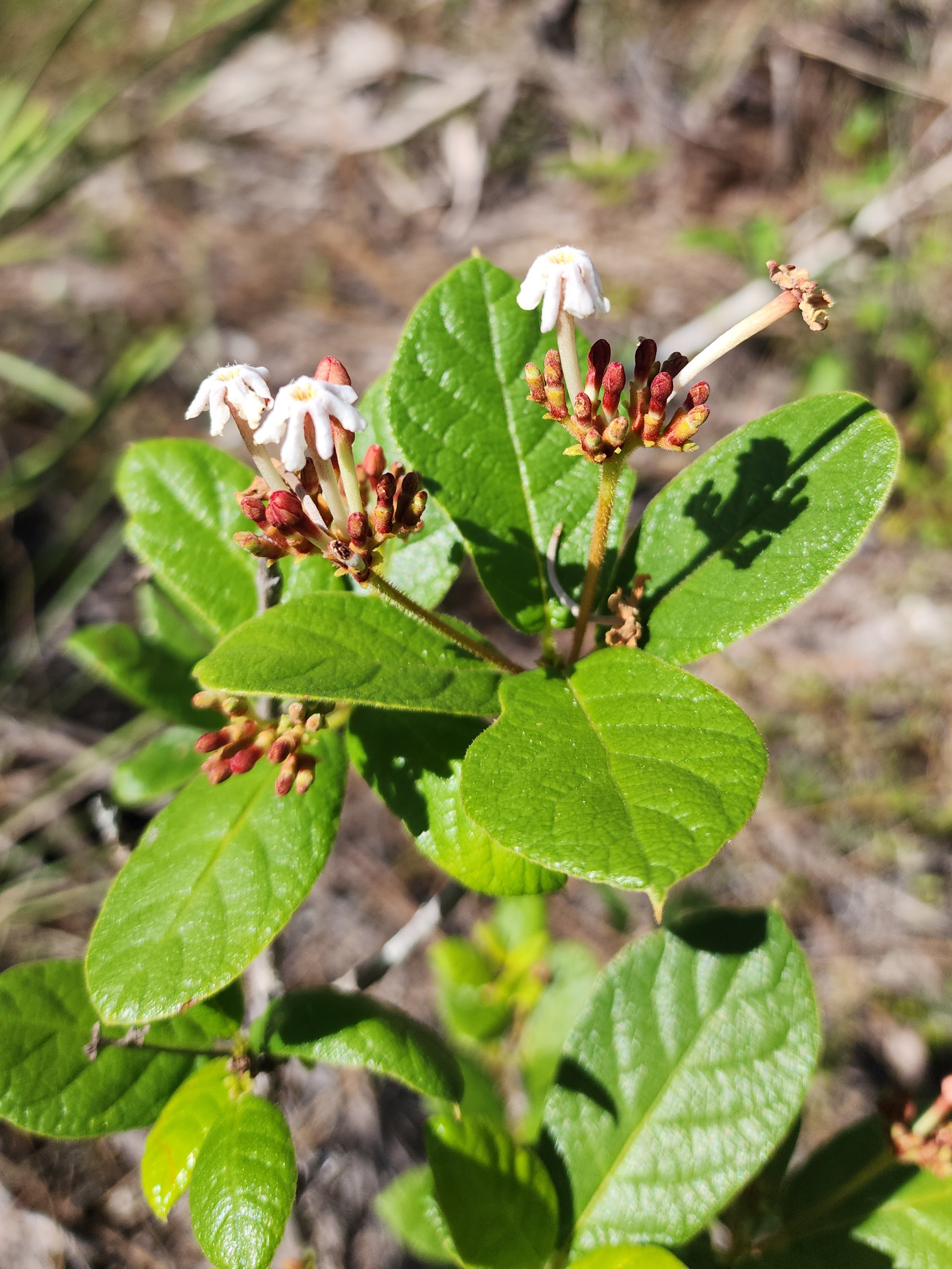
- Blooming in South Florida pine rockland habitat

Conservation status
- Least Concern (IUCN 3.1)

- Apparently Secure (NatureServe)

Scientific classification
- Kingdom: Plantae
- Clade: Tracheophytes
- Clade: Angiosperms
- Clade: Eudicots
- Clade: Asterids
- Order: Gentianales
- Family: Rubiaceae
- Genus: Guettarda
- Species: G. scabra

Binomial name
- Guettarda scabra (L.) Vent.

Synonyms
- Matthiola scabra L.

= Guettarda scabra =

Species of plant

Guettarda scabra, commonly known as the rough velvetseed, is a species of plant in the family Rubiaceae native to the Neotropics.

== Gallery ==
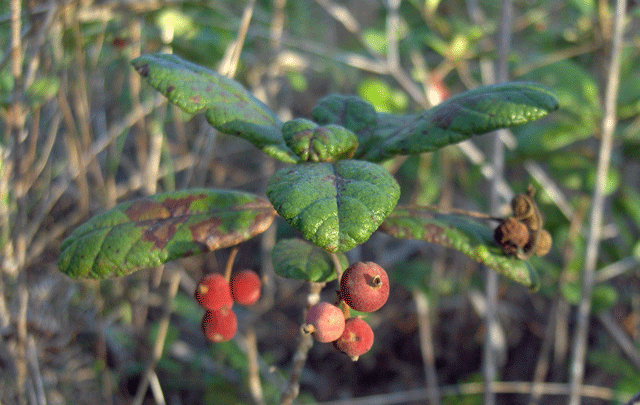
Bearing fruit
