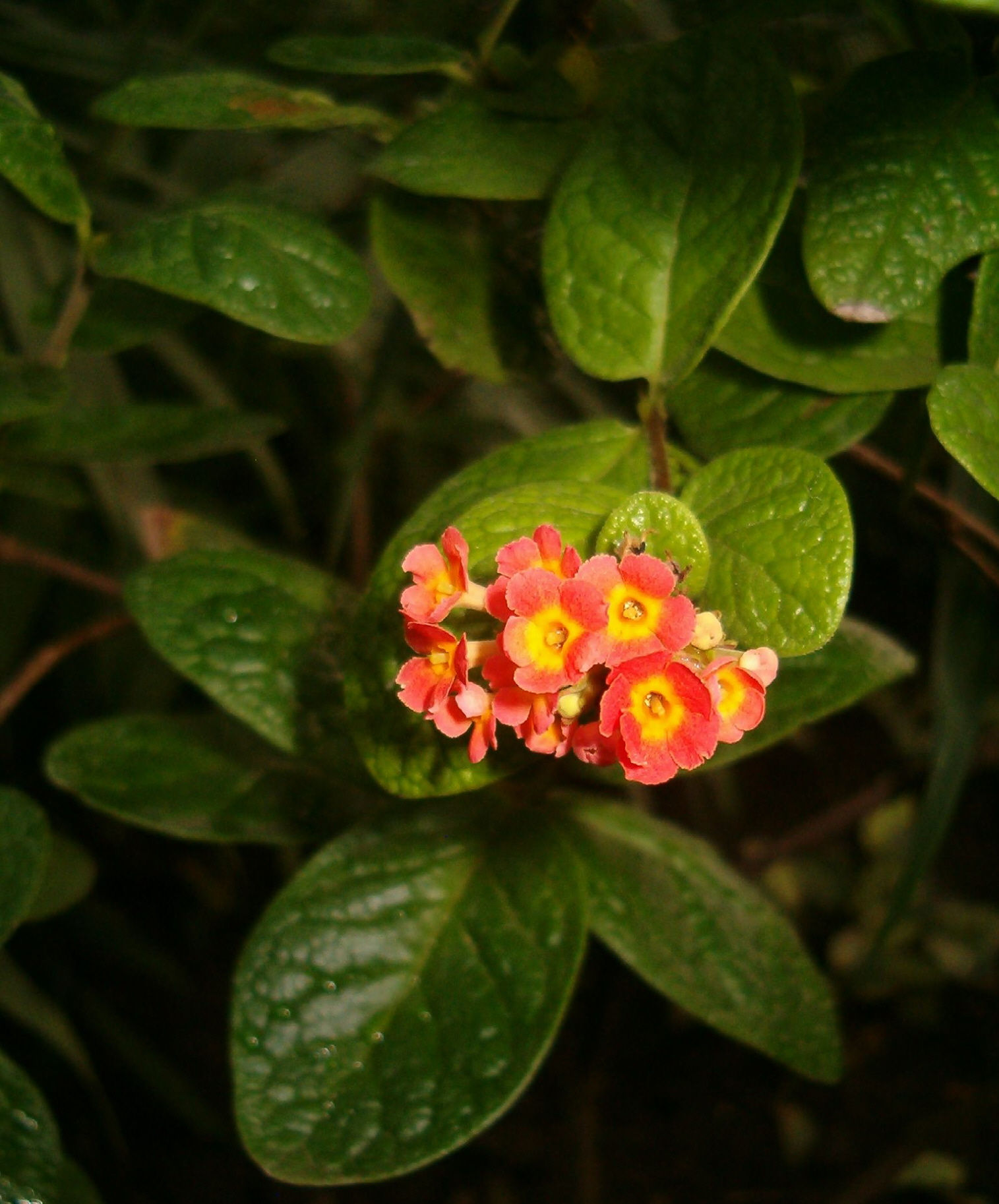
- Rondeletia odorata

Scientific classification
- Kingdom: Plantae
- Clade: Embryophytes
- Clade: Tracheophytes
- Clade: Spermatophytes
- Clade: Angiosperms
- Clade: Eudicots
- Clade: Asterids
- Order: Gentianales
- Family: Rubiaceae
- Tribe: Rondeletieae
- Genus: Rondeletia; L. (1753)

Type species
- Rondeletia americana L.

Species
- 154; see text.

Synonyms
- Arachnimorpha Desv. (1825); Lightfootia Schreb. (1789); Petesia P.Browne (1756); Zamaria Raf. (1820), nom. nud.

= Rondeletia (plant) =

Genus of flowering plants

Rondeletia is a genus of flowering plants in the family Rubiaceae. It is endemic to the Neotropics. There are around 160 species.

Rondeletia odorata is widely grown as an ornamental. Several other species are also known in cultivation.

Rondeletia was named in 1753 by Linnaeus in his book, Species Plantarum. This genus name commemorates the French physician Guillaume Rondelet (1507-1566).

The type species for Rondeletia is Rondeletia americana. It is little known and rarely collected.

The circumscription of Rondeletia has varied greatly from one author to another. Rogiera, Arachnothryx, and a few others have been included in Rondeletia by some authors, but molecular phylogenetic studies have shown that they are closer to Guettarda than to Rondeletia, and they are now recognized as separate genera. Even with these segregates removed, Rondeletia remains polyphyletic and will be substantially revised after further phylogenetic study.

== Species ==
154 species are currently accepted.

- Rondeletia acunae Borhidi & M.Fernández
- Rondeletia adamsii Proctor
- Rondeletia alaternoides A.Rich.
- Rondeletia americana L.
- Rondeletia amplexicaulis Urb.
- Rondeletia anguillensis R.A.Howard & E.A.Kellogg
- Rondeletia anomala Veitch
- Rondeletia apiculata Urb.
- Rondeletia areolata Urb.
- Rondeletia arida Borhidi & M.Fernández
- Rondeletia aristeguietae Steyerm.
- Rondeletia aurantiaca Urb. & Ekman
- Rondeletia avenia C.Wright
- Rondeletia azuensis Urb
- Rondeletia azulensis Urb.
- Rondeletia baracoensis Britton
- Rondeletia barahonensis Urb.
- Rondeletia belizensis Standl.
- Rondeletia berteroana DC.
- Rondeletia bicolor Britton
- Rondeletia bissei Borhidi & M.Fernández
- Rondeletia brachyantha Urb.
- Rondeletia brachyphylla Proctor ex C.D.Adams
- Rondeletia bracteosa Borhidi & M.Fernández
- Rondeletia brauseana Urb.
- Rondeletia brigandina Urb. & Ekman
- Rondeletia buxifolia Vahl
- Rondeletia cacuminis Urb. & Ekman
- Rondeletia calophylla Standl.
- Rondeletia camarioca C.Wright
- Rondeletia carnea Urb. & Ekman
- Rondeletia chamaebuxifolia Griseb.
- Rondeletia chinajensis Standl. & Steyerm.
- Rondeletia christii Urb.
- Rondeletia cincta Griseb.
- Rondeletia clarendonensis Britton ex S.Moore
- Rondeletia combsii Greenm.
- Rondeletia combsioides M.Fernández & Borhidi
- Rondeletia conferta Urb. & Ekman
- Rondeletia convoluta M.Fernández & Borhidi
- Rondeletia coronata Urb.
- Rondeletia crassinervis Borhidi
- Rondeletia cristalensis Urb.
- Rondeletia cumanensis Kunth
- Rondeletia cymulosa Proctor
- Rondeletia daphnoides Griseb.
- Rondeletia dilatata Rottb.
- Rondeletia diplocalyx Urb.
- Rondeletia disperma Jacq.
- Rondeletia dolphinensis Proctor
- Rondeletia domatiata Urb.
- Rondeletia ekmanii Britton & Standl.
- Rondeletia elegans Britton
- Rondeletia eriantha Benth.
- Rondeletia eriocarpa H.Karst.
- Rondeletia erythroneura H.Karst.
- Rondeletia exasperata Borhidi
- Rondeletia feketeana Borhidi
- Rondeletia filisepala Borhidi
- Rondeletia formonia Urb. & Ekman
- Rondeletia fortunensis Borhidi
- Rondeletia fuertesii Urb.
- Rondeletia galanensis M.Fernández & Borhidi
- Rondeletia glauca Griseb.
- Rondeletia glomeruliflora Alain
- Rondeletia grandisepala Alain
- Rondeletia hameliifolia Dwyer & M.V.Hayden
- Rondeletia harrisii Urb.
- Rondeletia heterochroa Urb.
- Rondeletia hirsuta Sw.
- Rondeletia hirta Sw.
- Rondeletia holdridgei Borhidi
- Rondeletia hypoleuca Griseb.
- Rondeletia impressa Krug & Urb.
- Rondeletia incana Sw.
- Rondeletia × incerta Borhidi & M.Fernández
- Rondeletia inermis (Spreng.) Krug & Urb.
- Rondeletia ingrata Standl.
- Rondeletia insularis Britton
- Rondeletia intermixta Britton
- Rondeletia jamaicensis Proctor
- Rondeletia laevigata W.T.Aiton
- Rondeletia larensis Steyerm.
- Rondeletia leonii Britton
- Rondeletia ligulata Urb.
- Rondeletia lindeniana A.Rich.
- Rondeletia linearisepala Alain
- Rondeletia liogieri Borhidi
- Rondeletia lomensis Urb.
- Rondeletia lucida M.Fernández & Borhidi
- Rondeletia martinicensis Krug & Urb.
- Rondeletia micarensis Urb.
- Rondeletia microcarpa Urb. & Ekman
- Rondeletia microphylla Griseb.
- Rondeletia minutifolia Urb.
- Rondeletia miraflorensis M.Fernández & Borhidi
- Rondeletia mollis S.F.Blake ex Steyerm.
- Rondeletia mornicola Urb. & Ekman
- Rondeletia naguensis Britton & P.Wilson
- Rondeletia nalgensis Urb. & Ekman
- Rondeletia nemoralis Proctor
- Rondeletia nimanimae Krug & Urb.
- Rondeletia nipensis Urb.
- Rondeletia × obscura Borhidi & M.Fernández
- Rondeletia ochracea Urb.
- Rondeletia odorata Jacq.
- Rondeletia orinocensis Steyerm.
- Rondeletia pachyphylla Krug & Urb.
- Rondeletia pallida Britton
- Rondeletia panamensis DC.
- Rondeletia papayoensis M.Fernández & Borhidi
- Rondeletia parviflora Poir.
- Rondeletia paucinervis Urb. & Ekman
- Rondeletia pedicellaris C.Wright
- Rondeletia peduncularis A.Rich.
- Rondeletia peninsularis M.Fernández & Borhidi
- Rondeletia perfae Alain
- Rondeletia petiolata Proctor
- Rondeletia pilosa Sw.
- Rondeletia plicatula Urb.
- Rondeletia polita Griseb.
- Rondeletia portlandensis Proctor
- Rondeletia portoricensis Krug & Urb.
- Rondeletia potrerillona Urb. & Ekman
- Rondeletia pseudorugelii Borhidi & M.Fernández
- Rondeletia pubescens Kunth
- Rondeletia pulchella Alain
- Rondeletia purdiei Hook.f.
- Rondeletia pycnophylla Urb.
- Rondeletia racemosa Sw.
- Rondeletia rigida Griseb.
- Rondeletia rohrii R.O.Williams & Cheesman
- Rondeletia roynaefolia DC.
- Rondeletia rugelii Urb.
- Rondeletia savannarum Britton
- Rondeletia saxicola Britton
- Rondeletia scabrella K.Krause
- Rondeletia selleana Urb. & Ekman
- Rondeletia shaferi Urb. & Britton
- Rondeletia steirophylla Urb.
- Rondeletia steirophylloides Borhidi & M.Fernández
- Rondeletia stipularis (L.) Druce
- Rondeletia subcanescens M.Fernández & Borhidi
- Rondeletia subcordata Standl.
- Rondeletia subglabra Krug & Urb.
- Rondeletia subsessilifolia Proctor
- Rondeletia susannae Borhidi
- Rondeletia sylvestris S.Moore
- Rondeletia toaensis M.Fernández & Borhidi
- Rondeletia tubulosa Borhidi & M.Fernández
- Rondeletia umbellulata Sw.
- Rondeletia vacciniifolia Britton
- Rondeletia vazquezii Borhidi & O.Muñiz
- Rondeletia venezuelensis Steyerm.
- Rondeletia venosa Griseb.
- Rondeletia virgata Sw.

=== Formerly placed here ===
- Arachnothryx peruviana (as Rondeletia peruviana Standl.)
- Jamaicanthus laurifolius (as Rondeletia laurifolia Sw.
- Renistipula galeottii (as Rondeletia galeottii Standl.)
- Stevensia ovatifolia (as Rondeletia ovatifolia (Urb. & Ekman) Borhidi)
- Tainus pitreanus (as Rondeletia pitreana Urb. & Ekman)
