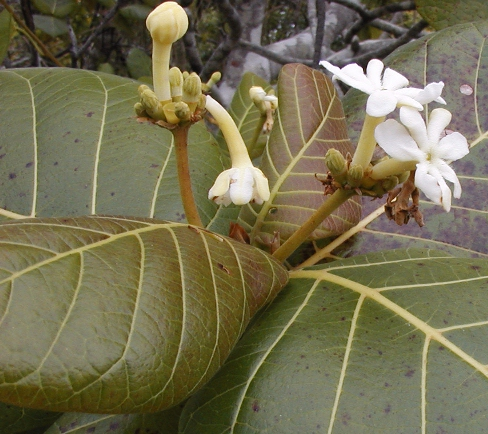
- Guettarda speciosa

Scientific classification
- Kingdom: Plantae
- Clade: Tracheophytes
- Clade: Angiosperms
- Clade: Eudicots
- Clade: Asterids
- Order: Gentianales
- Family: Rubiaceae
- Subfamily: Cinchonoideae
- Tribe: Guettardeae
- Genus: Guettarda; L. (1753)

Type species
- Guettarda speciosa L.

Species
- 145; see text

Synonyms
- Cadamba Sonn. (1782); Dicrobotryum Willd. ex Schult. (1819); Donkelaaria Lem. (1855); Edechia Loefl. (1758); Halesia P.Browne (1756); Laugieria Jacq. (1760); Matthiola Plum. ex L. (1753), nom. rej.; Sardinia Vell. (1829); Viviania Raf. (1814)

= Guettarda =

Genus of flowering plants

Guettarda is a plant genus in the family Rubiaceae. Most of these plants are known by the common name velvetseed.

== Distribution ==
Most of the species are Neotropical. Twenty are found in New Caledonia and one reaches Australia. A few others are found on islands and in coastal areas of the Indian and Pacific Oceans. It is a tree of coastal habitats, up to 18 m (59 ft) in height.

== Taxonomy ==
Three species (G. odorata, G. scabra, G. speciosa) are known in cultivation. Guettarda argentea provides edible fruit. The type species for the genus is Guettarda speciosa.

Guettarda was named by Linnaeus in 1753 in his book Species Plantarum. This generic name is in honour of the 18th century French naturalist Jean-Étienne Guettard.

The genus Guettarda is much in need of revision. Molecular phylogenetic studies have found it to be several times polyphyletic with some of its clades paraphyletic over small genera.

== Species ==
Plants of the World Online currently accepts 145 species, which are listed below. Other estimates of the number of species range from about 50 to 162.

- Guettarda abbottii Urb.
- Guettarda aculeolata Urb.
- Guettarda adulterina Urb. & Ekman
- Guettarda amblyophylla Urb. & Ekman
- Guettarda andamanica Goel & Mehrotra
- Guettarda angelica Martius
- Guettarda angustata Urb. & Ekman
- Guettarda apiculata Urb. & Ekman
- Guettarda argentea Lam.
- Guettarda aromatica Poepp.
- Guettarda artensis Guillaumin
- Guettarda baladensis Guillaumin
- Guettarda baltenweckii Urb.
- Guettarda baracoensis Bisse
- Guettarda barahonensis Urb.
- Guettarda blanchetiana Müll.Arg.
- Guettarda brenesii Standl.
- Guettarda brevinodis Urb.
- Guettarda caatingae Suess.
- Guettarda cahosiana Urb. & Ekman
- Guettarda calcicola Britton
- Guettarda calyptrata A.Rich.
- Guettarda camagueyensis Britton
- Guettarda clarensis Britton
- Guettarda coatzacoalcensis Ramos & Borhidi
- Guettarda cobrensis Standl.
- Guettarda colubrinoides Standl.
- Guettarda comata Standley
- Guettarda combsii Urb.
- Guettarda comosa Müll.Arg.
- Guettarda cordata Kunth
- Guettarda coxiana Britton
- Guettarda crassipes Britton
- Guettarda crenulata Urb. & Ekman
- Guettarda cueroensis Britton
- Guettarda davidseorum Lorence
- Guettarda dealbata M.Martens & Galeotti
- Guettarda deamii Standl.
- Guettarda dictyophylla Urb.
- Guettarda divaricata (Humb. & Bonpl. ex Schult.) Standl.
- Guettarda duckei Standl.
- Guettarda ekmanii Borhidi
- Guettarda elegans Urb.
- Guettarda elliptica Sprengel – oval-leaf velvetseed
- Guettarda elongata Borhidi, K.Velasco & Vásq.-Mart.
- Guettarda erosa Urb. & Ekman
- Guettarda excisa Urb. & Ekman
- Guettarda ferox Standl.
- Guettarda ferruginea Griseb.
- Guettarda filipes Standl.
- Guettarda foliacea Standl.
- Guettarda frangulifolia Urban
- Guettarda frondosa Moritz ex Standl.
- Guettarda fusca Pancher ex Baill.
- Guettarda gaumeri Standl.
- Guettarda grazielae M.R.Barbosa
- Guettarda guerrerensis Borhidi
- Guettarda hermosa Blanco
- Guettarda heterosepala Guillaumin
- Guettarda hoffmannseggii Müll.Arg.
- Guettarda humboldtensis Guillaumin
- Guettarda hypoglauca Standl.
- Guettarda inaequipes Urb.
- Guettarda insularis Brandegee
- Guettarda krugii Urban
- Guettarda lacornea Urb. & Ekman
- Guettarda lamprophylla Urb.
- Guettarda lanuginosa Urb. & Britton
- Guettarda leai Ridl.
- Guettarda leonis Alain
- Guettarda lindeniana A.Rich.
- Guettarda longiflora Grisebach
- Guettarda macrantha Benth.
- Guettarda macrosperma Donn.Sm.
- Guettarda malacophylla Standl.
- Guettarda mattogrossensis S.Moore
- Guettarda membranacea Sw.
- Guettarda mephitica Guillaumin
- Guettarda mollis DC.
- Guettarda monocarpa Urb.
- Guettarda multinervis Urb.
- Guettarda munizii Borhidi
- Guettarda nannocarpa Urb. & Ekman
- Guettarda nashii Britton & Millsp.
- Guettarda nervosa Urb. & Ekman
- Guettarda ocoana Urb. & Ekman
- Guettarda ocoteifolia Standl.
- Guettarda odorata Lamarck
- Guettarda organosia Urb.
- Guettarda ovalifolia Urb.
- Guettarda oxyphylla Urb.
- Guettarda paludosa Müll.Arg.
- Guettarda parallelineura Guillaumin
- Guettarda pinariona Urb.
- Guettarda platypoda DC.
- Guettarda pohliana Müll.Arg.
- Guettarda polytheca Urb. & Ekman
- Guettarda preneloupii Urb.
- Guettarda psiloclada Urb.
- Guettarda punctata Urb. & Ekman
- Guettarda pungens Urb.
- Guettarda quadrifida Borhidi & Reyes-García
- Guettarda ramuliflora Beurl.
- †Guettarda retusa C. Wright – Cuban guettarda tree – extinct (1869)
- Guettarda rhabdocalyx Müll.Arg.
- Guettarda rhamnifolia Standl.
- Guettarda rigida A.Rich.
- Guettarda roigiana Borhidi & O.Muñiz
- Guettarda rotundifolia Urb.
- Guettarda roupaliifolia Rusby
- Guettarda rusbyi Standl.
- Guettarda sageretioides Ant.Molina
- Guettarda sanblasensis Dwyer
- Guettarda saxicola Urb.
- Guettarda scabra Lamarck – rough-leaf velvetseed
- Guettarda sciaphila Urb.
- Guettarda sericea Müll.Arg.
- Guettarda shaferi Standl.
- Guettarda sierrae P.A.González & J.L.Gómez
- Guettarda sotonunezii Borhidi, E.Martínez & Ramos
- Guettarda speciosa L. – beach gardenia
- Guettarda spinifera Urb.
- Guettarda splendens Baill.
- Guettarda spruceana Müll.Arg.
- Guettarda stenophylla Urb.
- Guettarda subcapitata C.M.Taylor
- Guettarda tenuiramis Urb.
- Guettarda tikalana Lundell
- Guettarda tobagensis Urb.
- Guettarda torbeciana Urb. & Ekman
- Guettarda tortuensis Urb. & Ekman
- Guettarda trimera Guillaumin
- Guettarda turpinii Urb.
- Guettarda umbellata Spreng.
- Guettarda undulata Griseb.
- Guettarda urbanii Ekman
- Guettarda uruguayensis Chamisso & Schlechtendal – Uruguayan jasmine
- Guettarda valenzuelana A.Rich.
- Guettarda velutina Zahlbr.
- Guettarda viburnoides Cham. & Schltdl.
- Guettarda vieillardii Guillaumin
- Guettarda vulpina Borhidi
- Guettarda wagapensis Guillaumin
- Guettarda wayaensis R.O.Gardner

=== Formerly placed here ===
- Tinadendron noumeanum (Baill.) Achille (as Guettarda noumeana Baill.)
- Tournefortiopsis crispiflora subsp. discolor (Rusby) A.C.Berger & C.M.Taylor (as Guettarda ochreata Schechtendal)
