= List of Rhynchospora species =

List of plants

Rhynchospora is a diverse plant genus of sedges with approximately 400 currently accepted taxa.

This is an alphabetical list of the Rhynchospora species.

== A ==
- Rhynchospora aberrans C.B.Clarke
- Rhynchospora acanthoma A.C.Araújo & Longhi-Wagner
- Rhynchospora affinis W.Fitzg.
- Rhynchospora agostiniana T.Koyama
- Rhynchospora alba (L.) Vahl – white beaksedge
- Rhynchospora albescens (Miq.) Kük.
- Rhynchospora albiceps Kunth
- Rhynchospora albida (Nees) Boeckeler
- Rhynchospora albobracteata A.C.Araújo
- Rhynchospora albomarginata Kük.
- Rhynchospora albotuberculata Kük.
- Rhynchospora almensis D.A.Simpson
- Rhynchospora amazonica Poepp. ex Kunth
- Rhynchospora andresii Gómez-Laur.
- Rhynchospora angolensis Turrill
- Rhynchospora angosturensis W.W.Thomas
- Rhynchospora angusta (Gale) Sorrie, LeBlond & Weakley
- Rhynchospora angustifolia Palla
- Rhynchospora angustipaniculata M.T.Strong
- Rhynchospora arenicola Uittien
- Rhynchospora argentea Standl.
- Rhynchospora aripoensis Britton
- Rhynchospora aristata Boeckeler
- Rhynchospora armerioides J.Presl & C.Presl
- Rhynchospora asperula (Nees) Steud.
- Rhynchospora atlantica W.W.Thomas
- Rhynchospora austrobahiensis W.W.Thomas
- Rhynchospora ayangannensis M.T.Strong

== B ==
- Rhynchospora bakhuisensis M.T.Strong
- Rhynchospora baldwinii A.Gray – Baldwin's beaksedge
- Rhynchospora barbata (Vahl) Kunth
- Rhynchospora barrosiana Guagl.
- Rhynchospora belizensis Naczi & Silva Filho
- Rhynchospora berteroi (Spreng.) C.B.Clarke – little beaksedge
- Rhynchospora biflora Boeckeler – twoflower beaksedge
- Rhynchospora blepharophora (J.Presl & C.Presl) H.Pfeiff.
- Rhynchospora boeckeleriana Silva Filho & Boldrini
- Rhynchospora boivinii Boeckeler
- Rhynchospora bolivarana Steyerm.
- Rhynchospora boliviensis C.B.Clarke
- Rhynchospora boninensis Nakai ex Tuyama
- Rhynchospora brachychaeta C.Wright – West Indian beaksedge
- Rhynchospora bracteovillosa A.C.Araújo & W.W.Thomas
- Rhynchospora bradei (R.Gross) W.W.Thomas
- Rhynchospora brasiliensis Boeckeler
- Rhynchospora brevifoliata (Kük.) Greuter & R.Rankin
- Rhynchospora brevirostris Griseb.
- Rhynchospora breviuscula H.Pfeiff.
- Rhynchospora brittonii Gale
- Rhynchospora brownii Roem. & Schult.
- Rhynchospora brunnea Boeckeler
- Rhynchospora bucherorum León

== C ==
- Rhynchospora cabecarae Gómez-Laur.
- Rhynchospora cacuminicola Gale
- Rhynchospora caduca Elliott – anglestem beaksedge
- Rhynchospora caduciglumis P.Weber & R.Trevis.
- Rhynchospora caesionux T.Koyama
- Rhynchospora cajennensis Boeckeler
- Rhynchospora calderana D.A.Simpson
- Rhynchospora californica Gale – California beaksedge
- Rhynchospora candida (Nees) Boeckeler
- Rhynchospora capillacea Torr. – needle beaksedge
- Rhynchospora capillifolia Boeckeler
- Rhynchospora capitata (Kunth) Roem. & Schult.
- Rhynchospora capitellata (Michx.) Vahl – brownish beaksedge
- Rhynchospora caracasana (Kunth) Boeckeler
- Rhynchospora careyana Fernald – broadfruit horned beaksedge
- Rhynchospora cariciformis Nees
- Rhynchospora carrillensis Gómez-Laur.
- Rhynchospora castanea T.Koyama
- Rhynchospora catharinensis Barros
- Rhynchospora caucasica Palla
- Rhynchospora cephalantha A.Gray – bunched beaksedge
- Rhynchospora cephalotes (L.) Vahl
- Rhynchospora cephalotoides Griseb.
- Rhynchospora cernua Griseb.
- Rhynchospora chalarocephala Fernald & Gale – loose-head beaksedge
- Rhynchospora chapadensis Silva Filho, W.W.Thomas & Boldrini
- Rhynchospora chapmanii M.A.Curtis – Chapman's beaksedge
- Rhynchospora chimantensis W.W.Thomas
- Rhynchospora chinensis Nees & Meyen – spiked beaksedge
- Rhynchospora ciliaris (Michx.) C.Mohr – fringed beaksedge
- Rhynchospora ciliolata Boeckeler
- Rhynchospora colorata (L.) H.Pfeiff. – starrush whitetop
- Rhynchospora comata (Link) Schult.
- Rhynchospora compressa J.Carey ex Chapm. – flatfruit beaksedge
- Rhynchospora conferta (Nees) Boeckeler
- Rhynchospora confinis (Nees) C.B.Clarke
- Rhynchospora confusa Ballard
- Rhynchospora consanguinea (Kunth) Boeckeler
- Rhynchospora contracta (Nees) J.Raynal – tropical beaksedge
- Rhynchospora contraligularis W.W.Thomas
- Rhynchospora cordatachenia M.T.Strong
- Rhynchospora coriifolia Boeckeler
- Rhynchospora corniculata (Lam.) A.Gray – short-bristled horned beaksedge
- Rhynchospora corymbosa (L.) Britton – golden beaksedge, matamat
- Rhynchospora crinigera Boeckeler
- Rhynchospora crinipes Gale – mosquito beaksedge
- Rhynchospora crispa Gale
- Rhynchospora croydonensis R.Booth
- Rhynchospora cubensis A.Rich.
- Rhynchospora curtissii Britton – Curtiss' beaksedge
- Rhynchospora curvula Griseb.

== D ==
- Rhynchospora davidsei W.W.Thomas
- Rhynchospora debilis Gale – savannah beaksedge
- Rhynchospora decurrens Chapm. – swamp-forest beaksedge
- Rhynchospora dentinux C.B.Clarke
- Rhynchospora depauperata Palla
- Rhynchospora depressa (Kük.) Gale
- Rhynchospora depressirostris M.T.Strong – quill beaksedge
- Rhynchospora diodon (Nees) Griseb.
- Rhynchospora dissitiflora Steud. ex Boeckeler
- Rhynchospora dissitispicula T.Koyama
- Rhynchospora distichophylla Boeckeler
- Rhynchospora divaricata (Ham.) M.T.Strong – hairy beaksedge
- Rhynchospora divergens Chapm. ex M.A.Curtis – spreading beaksedge
- Rhynchospora dives Standl.
- Rhynchospora domingensis Urb. – long-leaf beaksedge
- Rhynchospora donselaarii M.T.Strong
- Rhynchospora duckei Gross
- Rhynchospora duidae Steyerm.
- Rhynchospora durangensis Kral & W.W.Thomas

== E ==
- Rhynchospora ebracteata (Standl.) H.Pfeiff.
- Rhynchospora eburnea Kral & W.W.Thomas
- Rhynchospora edwalliana Boeckeler
- Rhynchospora elatior Kunth
- Rhynchospora elegantula Maury
- Rhynchospora elliottii A.Dietr. – Elliott's beaksedge
- Rhynchospora emaciata (Nees) Boeckeler
- Rhynchospora enmanuelis Luceño & Rocha
- Rhynchospora eurycarpa A.C.Araújo & Longhi-Wagner
- Rhynchospora exaltata Kunth
- Rhynchospora exilis Boeckeler
- Rhynchospora eximia (Nees) Boeckeler – Florida beaksedge
- Rhynchospora exserta C.B.Clarke

== F ==
- Rhynchospora faberi C.B.Clarke
- Rhynchospora fallax Uittien
- Rhynchospora fascicularis (Michx.) Vahl – fascicled beaksedge
- Rhynchospora fauriei Franch.
- Rhynchospora fernaldii Gale – Fernald's beaksedge
- Rhynchospora filifolia A.Gray – threadleaf beaksedge
- Rhynchospora filiformis Vahl – bird beaksedge
- Rhynchospora floridensis (Britton ex Small) H.Pfeiff. – Florida whitetop
- Rhynchospora fluminensis L.B.Sm.
- Rhynchospora foliosa (Kunth) L.B.Sm.
- Rhynchospora fujiiana Makino
- Rhynchospora fusca (L.) W.T.Aiton – brown beaksedge

== G ==
- Rhynchospora gageri Britton
- Rhynchospora galeana Naczi, W.M.Knapp & G.Moor – shortbristle beaksedge
- Rhynchospora gaudichaudii (Brongn.) L.B.Sm.
- Rhynchospora gigantea Link – giant beaksedge
- Rhynchospora glaziovii Boeckeler
- Rhynchospora globosa (Kunth) Roem. & Schult. – savannah starlet
- Rhynchospora globularis (Chapm.) Small – globe beaksedge
- Rhynchospora glomerata (L.) Vahl – clustered beaksedge
- Rhynchospora gollmeri Boeckeler
- Rhynchospora gracilenta A.Gray – slender beaksedge
- Rhynchospora gracillima Thwaites
- Rhynchospora grandifolia Boeckeler
- Rhynchospora grayi Kunth – Gray's beaksedge
- Rhynchospora guaramacalensis M.T.Strong

== H ==
- Rhynchospora × hakkodensis Mochizuki
- Rhynchospora harleyi Silva Filho, W.W.Thomas & Boldrini
- Rhynchospora harperi Small – Harper's beaksedge
- Rhynchospora harveyi W.Boott – Harvey's beaksedge
- Rhynchospora hassleri C.B.Clarke
- Rhynchospora hatschbachii T.Koyama
- Rhynchospora heterochaeta S.T.Blake
- Rhynchospora hieronymi Boeckeler
- Rhynchospora hildebrandtii Boeckeler
- Rhynchospora hirsuta (Vahl) Vahl
- Rhynchospora hirta (Nees) Boeckeler
- Rhynchospora hirticeps (Kük.) T.Koyama
- Rhynchospora hispidula Griseb.
- Rhynchospora holoschoenoides (Rich.) Herter – fly beaksedge
- Rhynchospora hookeri Boeckeler

== I ==
- Rhynchospora iberae Guagl.
- Rhynchospora ierensis C.D.Adams
- Rhynchospora imeriensis (Kük.) W.W.Thomas
- Rhynchospora immensa Kük.
- Rhynchospora inexpansa (Michx.) Vahl – nodding beaksedge
- Rhynchospora intermedia (Chapm.) Britton – pine barren beaksedge
- Rhynchospora intermixta C.Wright
- Rhynchospora inundata (Oakes) Fernald – narrowfruit horned beaksedge

== J ==
- Rhynchospora jaliscensis McVaugh
- Rhynchospora jamaicensis Britton – Jamaican beaksedge
- Rhynchospora joveroensis Britton
- Rhynchospora jubata Liebm.
- Rhynchospora junciformis (Kunth) Boeckeler

== K ==
- Rhynchospora killipii Gross
- Rhynchospora knieskernii J.Carey – Knieskern's beaksedge
- Rhynchospora kunthii Nees ex Kunth – Kunth's beaksedge

== L ==
- Rhynchospora lapensis C.B.Clarke
- Rhynchospora latibracteata Guagl.
- Rhynchospora latifolia (Baldwin ex Elliott) W.W.Thomas – sandswamp whitetop
- Rhynchospora leae C.B.Clarke
- Rhynchospora legrandii Kük. ex Barros
- Rhynchospora leptocarpa (Chapm. ex Britton) Small – brownish beaksedge, slender-fruit beaksedge
- Rhynchospora leptorhyncha C.Wright
- Rhynchospora leucoloma A.C.Araújo & Longhi-Wagner
- Rhynchospora leucostachys Boeckeler
- Rhynchospora lindeniana Griseb. – Bahama beaksedge
- Rhynchospora lindmanii H.Pfeiff.
- Rhynchospora locuples C.B.Clarke
- Rhynchospora loefgrenii Boeckeler
- Rhynchospora longa (Lindm.) H.Pfeiff.
- Rhynchospora longibracteata Boeckeler
- Rhynchospora longiflora C.Presl
- Rhynchospora longisetis R.Br.
- Rhynchospora luetzelburgiana Kük.

== M ==
- Rhynchospora macra (C.B.Clarke ex Britton) Small – large beaksedge
- Rhynchospora macrantha (Kunth) W.W.Thomas
- Rhynchospora macrochaeta Steud. ex Boeckeler
- Rhynchospora macrostachya Torr. ex A.Gray – tall horned beaksedge
- Rhynchospora maguireana T.Koyama
- Rhynchospora malasica C.B.Clarke
- Rhynchospora mandonii C.B.Clarke
- Rhynchospora marcelo-guerrae Luceño & M.Alves
- Rhynchospora marisculus Lindl. & Nees – Caribbean beaksedge
- Rhynchospora marliniana Naczi, W.M.Knapp & W.W.Thomas – Marlin beaksedge
- Rhynchospora marquisensis F.Br.
- Rhynchospora mayarensis León
- Rhynchospora megalocarpa A.Gray – sandyfield beaksedge
- Rhynchospora megaplumosa E.L.Bridges & Orzell – Manatee beaksedge
- Rhynchospora megapotamica (A.Spreng.) H.Pfeiff.
- Rhynchospora melanocarpa A.C.Araújo & W.W.Thomas
- Rhynchospora mendoncana Boeckeler
- Rhynchospora mesoatlantica Eberly & Naczi – Mid-Atlantic beaksedge
- Rhynchospora metralis C.B.Clarke
- Rhynchospora mexicana (Liebm.) Steud.
- Rhynchospora microcarpa Baldwin ex A.Gray – southern beaksedge
- Rhynchospora microcephala (Britton) Britton – bunched beaksedge, smallhead beaksedge
- Rhynchospora miliacea (Lam.) A.Gray – millet beaksedge
- Rhynchospora mixta Britton – mingled beaksedge
- Rhynchospora modesti-lucennoi Castrov.
- Rhynchospora mollis (Wall.) Schult.
- Rhynchospora montana (Uittien) H.Pfeiff.

== N ==
- Rhynchospora nanuzae Rocha & Luceño
- Rhynchospora nardifolia (Kunth) Boeckeler
- Rhynchospora neesii Steud.
- Rhynchospora nervosa (Vahl) Boeckeler – yerba de estrella
- Rhynchospora nipensis Britton
- Rhynchospora nitens (Vahl) A.Gray – shortbeak beaksedge
- Rhynchospora nivea Boeckeler – showy whitetop beaksedge
- Rhynchospora nuda Gale

== O ==
- Rhynchospora odorata C.Wright ex Griseb. – fragrant beaksedge
- Rhynchospora oligantha A.Gray – featherbristle beaksedge
- Rhynchospora orbignyana (Brongn.) L.B.Sm.
- Rhynchospora oreoboloidea Gómez-Laur.
- Rhynchospora organensis C.B.Clarke

== P ==
- Rhynchospora pallida M.A.Curtis – pale beaksedge
- Rhynchospora panduranganii Viji, Shaju & Geetha Kum.
- Rhynchospora panicifolia Maury
- Rhynchospora papillosa W.W.Thomas
- Rhynchospora paraensis Schrad. ex Kunth
- Rhynchospora paramora Steyerm.
- Rhynchospora paranaensis A.C.Araújo & W.W.Thomas
- Rhynchospora patuligluma C.B.Clarke ex Lindm.
- Rhynchospora pearcei (C.B.Clarke) W.W.Thomas
- Rhynchospora pedersenii Guagl.
- Rhynchospora perplexa Britton – pineland beaksedge
- Rhynchospora perrieri Cherm.
- Rhynchospora peruviana (C.B.Clarke) W.W.Thomas
- Rhynchospora pilosa Boeckeler
- Rhynchospora pilulifera Bertol.
- Rhynchospora pirrensis W.W.Thomas
- Rhynchospora planifolia (T.Koyama) W.W.Thomas
- Rhynchospora pleiantha (Kük.) Gale – coastal beaksedge
- Rhynchospora plumosa Elliott – plumed beaksedge
- Rhynchospora pluricarpa Pilg.
- Rhynchospora plusquamrobusta Luceño & M.Martins
- Rhynchospora polyantha Steud.
- Rhynchospora polyphylla (Vahl) Vahl
- Rhynchospora polystachys (Turrill) H.Pfeiff.
- Rhynchospora praecincta Maury ex Micheli
- Rhynchospora prenteloupiana Boeckeler
- Rhynchospora pruinosa Griseb.
- Rhynchospora pseudomacrostachya Gerry Moore, Guagl. & Zartman
- Rhynchospora pterochaeta F.Muell.
- Rhynchospora pubera (Vahl) Boeckeler
- Rhynchospora pubisquama M.T.Strong
- Rhynchospora punctata Elliott – dotted beaksedge
- Rhynchospora pura (Nees) Griseb. – star sedge
- Rhynchospora pusilla Chapm. ex M.A.Curtis – fairy beaksedge

== R ==
- Rhynchospora racemosa C.Wright – racemed beaksedge
- Rhynchospora radicans (Schltdl. & Cham.) H.Pfeiff. – tropical whitetop
- Rhynchospora rariflora (Michx.) Elliott – fewflower beaksedge
- Rhynchospora recognita (Gale) Kral – globe beaksedge
- Rhynchospora recurvata (Nees) Steud.
- Rhynchospora reitzii Silva Filho, W.W.Thomas & Boldrini
- Rhynchospora reptans (Rich.) Kük.
- Rhynchospora rheophytica W.W.Thomas & Silva Filho
- Rhynchospora ridleyi C.B.Clarke
- Rhynchospora riedeliana C.B.Clarke
- Rhynchospora rigidifolia (Gilly) T.Koyama
- Rhynchospora rionegrensis P.Weber & W.W.Thomas
- Rhynchospora riparia (Nees) Boeckeler
- Rhynchospora robusta (Kunth) Boeckeler
- Rhynchospora roraimae Kük.
- Rhynchospora rosae W.W.Thomas
- Rhynchospora rosemariana D.A.Simpson
- Rhynchospora rostrata Lindm.
- Rhynchospora rubra (Lour.) Makino
- Rhynchospora rudis C.B.Clarke
- Rhynchospora rugosa (Vahl) Gale – claybank beaksedge
- Rhynchospora ruiziana Boeckeler
- Rhynchospora rupestris A.C.Araújo & W.W.Thomas
- Rhynchospora rupicola M.T.Strong

== S ==
- Rhynchospora sampaioana Gross
- Rhynchospora sanariapensis Steyerm.
- Rhynchospora sartoriana Boeckeler
- Rhynchospora saxisavannicola M.T.Strong
- Rhynchospora scabrata Griseb.
- Rhynchospora schiedeana Kunth
- Rhynchospora schmidtii Kük.
- Rhynchospora schomburgkiana (Boeckeler) T.Koyama
- Rhynchospora scirpoides (Torr.) Griseb. – long-beaked beaksedge
- Rhynchospora sclerioides Hook. & Arn. – Hawai'i beaksedge
- Rhynchospora scutellata Griseb. – Indianola beaksedge
- Rhynchospora seccoi C.S.Nunes, Silva Filho & A.Gil
- Rhynchospora sellowiana Steud.
- Rhynchospora semiinvolucrata J.Presl & C.Presl
- Rhynchospora serrana Silva Filho, W.W.Thomas & Boldrini
- Rhynchospora seslerioides Griseb.
- Rhynchospora setigera (Kunth) Griseb.
- Rhynchospora shaferi Britton
- Rhynchospora siguaneana Britton
- Rhynchospora simplex (Kük.) Kük.
- Rhynchospora smithii W.W.Thomas
- Rhynchospora sola Gale – Cuban beaksedge
- Rhynchospora solitaria R.M.Harper – onespike beaksedge
- Rhynchospora sparsiflora (Kunth) L.B.Sm.
- Rhynchospora speciosa (Kunth) Boeckeler
- Rhynchospora splendens Lindm.
- Rhynchospora spruceana C.B.Clarke
- Rhynchospora squamulosa Kük.
- Rhynchospora stenocarpa Kunth
- Rhynchospora stenophylla Chapm. – coastal plain beaksedge
- Rhynchospora steyermarkii T.Koyama
- Rhynchospora stolonifera (Nees) Boeckeler
- Rhynchospora stricta Boeckeler
- Rhynchospora subdicephala T.Koyama
- Rhynchospora subimberbis Griseb.
- Rhynchospora sublanata Lindeman & Donsel.
- Rhynchospora submarginata Kük.
- Rhynchospora subplumosa C.B.Clarke
- Rhynchospora subsetigera H.Pfeiff.
- Rhynchospora subsetosa C.B.Clarke
- Rhynchospora subtenuifolia Kük.
- Rhynchospora subtilis Boeckeler

== T ==
- Rhynchospora talamancensis Gómez-Laur. & W.W.Thomas
- Rhynchospora tenella (Nees) Boeckeler
- Rhynchospora tenerrima Nees ex Spreng. – soldier beaksedge
- Rhynchospora tenuiflora (Brongn.) L.B.Sm.
- Rhynchospora tenuifolia Griseb.
- Rhynchospora tenuis Link – quill beaksedge
- Rhynchospora tepuiana Steyerm.
- Rhynchospora terminalis (Nees) Steud.
- Rhynchospora testacea Boeckeler
- Rhynchospora thornei Kral – Thorne's beaksedge
- Rhynchospora tomentosa Steyerm.
- Rhynchospora torresiana Britton & Standl.
- Rhynchospora torreyana A.Gray – Torrey's beaksedge
- Rhynchospora tracyi Britton – Tracy's beaksedge
- Rhynchospora trichochaeta C.B.Clarke
- Rhynchospora trichophora Nees
- Rhynchospora triflora Vahl
- Rhynchospora trispicata (Nees) Schrad. ex Steud.
- Rhynchospora tuerckheimii C.B.Clarke ex Kük.

== U ==
- Rhynchospora umbraticola Poepp. & Kunth
- Rhynchospora unguinux C.S.Nunes & A.Gil
- Rhynchospora unisetosa T.Koyama
- Rhynchospora urbanii Boeckeler

== V ==
- Rhynchospora velutina (Kunth) Boeckeler – red beaksedge
- Rhynchospora vulcani Boeckeler

== W ==
- Rhynchospora warmingii Boeckeler
- Rhynchospora waspamensis Kral & W.W.Thomas
- Rhynchospora watsonii (Britton) Davidse
- Rhynchospora widgrenii Boeckeler
- Rhynchospora wightiana (Nees) Steud.
- Rhynchospora wrightiana Boeckeler – Wright's beaksedge

== Z ==
- Rhynchospora zacualtipanensis M.T.Strong
