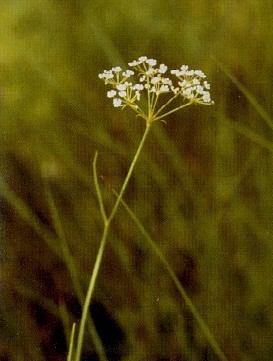

Conservation status
- Imperiled (NatureServe)

Scientific classification
- Kingdom: Plantae
- Clade: Tracheophytes
- Clade: Angiosperms
- Clade: Eudicots
- Clade: Asterids
- Order: Apiales
- Family: Apiaceae
- Genus: Tiedemannia
- Species: T. canbyi

Binomial name
- Tiedemannia canbyi (J.M.Coult. & Rose) Feist & S.R.Downie (2012)

Synonyms
- Oxypolis canbyi (J.M.Coult. & Rose) Fernald (1939); Oxypolis filiformis var. canbyi J.M.Coult. & Rose (1900)

= Tiedemannia canbyi =

Species of flowering plant

Tiedemannia canbyi (syn. Oxypolis canbyi) is a rare species of flowering plant in the carrot family known as Canby's dropwort and Canby's cowbane. It is native to the southeastern United States, where it occurs on the Atlantic coastal plain from North Carolina to Georgia, as well as the Chesapeake Bay area. It is threatened by the loss of the wetland habitat in which it grows. It is a federally listed endangered species of the United States.

== Description ==
This rhizomatous perennial herb grows up to 1.2 meters in maximum height. The narrow, hollow leaves resemble quills. The inflorescence is a compound umbel of many small flowers with white petals and red-tinged green sepals. Blooming occurs in August and September, sometimes lasting until October. The plant has a scent similar to dill. The stems extend along the ground as stolons, rooting at nodes. It can then produce a colony of many erect stems all belonging to one plant, spreading vegetatively.

== Ecology ==
The larva of the black swallowtail butterfly (Papilio polyxenes asterius) feed on the plant. They eat the stem, separating the inflorescence and sometimes preventing sexual reproduction; however, the plant more often reproduces asexually via cloning.

== Conservation status ==
There are about 53 documented populations of this plant, mainly in South Carolina and Georgia. There is one population each in Maryland and North Carolina. The species has been extirpated from Delaware. Most populations are small. It is estimated that only 18 populations are extant. The plant grows in a variety of wetland habitat types, including bays, sloughs, wet savannas, and ponds. Other plants in the habitat may include Ilex myrtifolia, Nyssa biflora, Taxodium ascendens, Pinus serotina, Stillingia aquatica, Rhynchospora tracyi, Rhynchospora inundata, Manisuris rugosa, Rhexia aristosa, Polygala cymosa, Pluchea rosea, Lobelia boykinii, and Hypericum denticulatum.

The main threat to this rare species is the destruction and alteration of its habitat. Wetlands across the coastal plain of the southeastern US have been dredged, drained, and used for agriculture, including silviculture operations. This process has altered the water regime, both on the surface and in the groundwater table, which in turn has affected the flora. In some cases, shrubs have invaded areas where they were naturally excluded in the pristine habitat. The dropwort grows best in open, unshaded areas that have no canopy. Conservation activities have included the removal of shrubs and trees, including sweetgum (Liquidambar styraciflua) and persimmon (Diospyros virginiana), that had been encroaching on the wetland and shading out the herb layer.

There are on going efforts to reintroduce this species to new areas including several projects in South Carolina.
