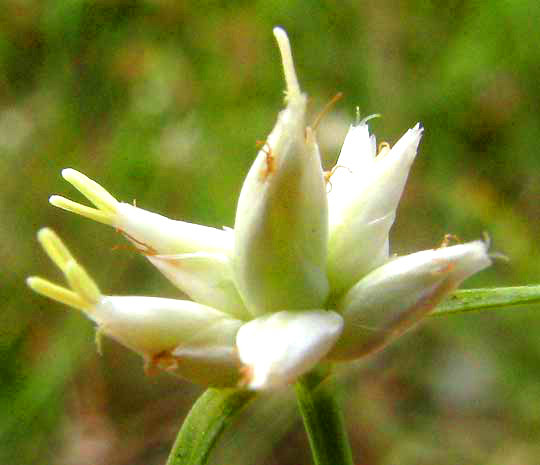
- Inflorescence

Scientific classification
- Kingdom: Plantae
- Clade: Tracheophytes
- Clade: Angiosperms
- Clade: Monocots
- Clade: Commelinids
- Order: Poales
- Family: Cyperaceae
- Genus: Rhynchospora
- Species: R. nivea

Binomial name
- Rhynchospora nivea Boeckeler 1873

Synonyms
- Dichromena nivea (Boeckeler) Boeckeler (1895); Dichromena nivea (Boeckeler) Britton (1888); Dichromena reverchonii S.H.Wright (1882)

= Rhynchospora nivea =

Species of plant

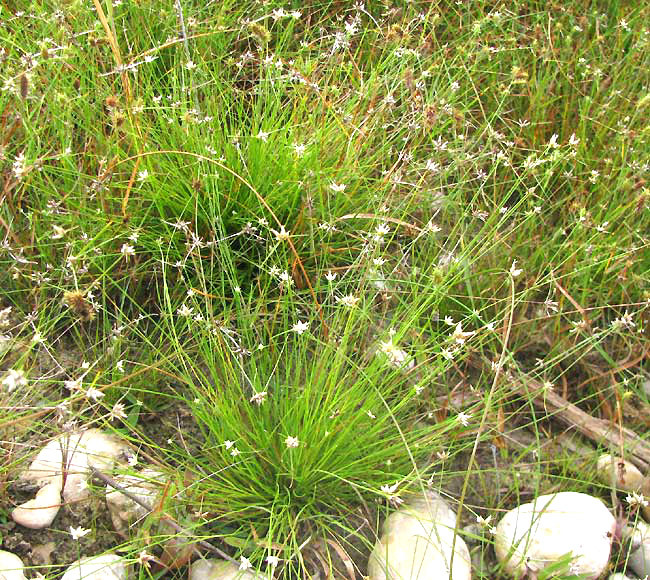
Showy whitetop beaksedge in habitat

Rhynchospora nivea, the showy whitetop beaksedge, is a particularly ornate member of the sedge family, the Cyperaceae.

== Description ==
Of the nearly 400 accepted species of Rhynchospora, showy whitetop beaksedge, Rhynchospora nivea, is one of the most distinctive and easy to recognize. Within its limited area of distribution, in the field if you find a beaksedge with these field marks, you have a showy whitetop beaksedge:

- The inflorescences' three to eleven teardrop-shaped flower spikelets are white.
- Leaf-like involucral bracts immediately below the white inflorescences are mostly 2–5 cm (3/4–2 in) long and exceedingly narrow, hairlike to 2 mm (3/32 in) wide; stem leaves are similarly unusually short and narrow.

Beyond those key distinctions, here are other features to look for:

- The plants are perennial and grow in wiry, dense tufts up to 40 cm (16 in) high, though usually they're shorter.
- Stems, or culms, are 3-cornered to flattened, with ribs.
- Stem leaves are very slender, at most 2 mm (3/32 in) wide.
- When flowering, styles extending beyond the white scales are deeply divided into 2 slender "stigmatic branches", not just indented.
- The one-seeded, achene-type fruits are very small, less than 0.8 mm (1/32 in) long and wide and their surfaces are transversely sharply wrinkled with wavy ridges.
- Hairlike bristles arising from the achene's base bear minute, pointed barbs along their sides directed upward toward the bristle's tip; at the bristles' bases the projections don't become feathery.

Wherever showy whitetop beaksedge occurs naturally, the only other beaksedge species with white spikelets are Rhynchospora colorata and Rhynchospora latifolia, which are both markedly larger, and the bracts below their inflorescences display much more whiteness. Also, if any whiteness appears on the Showy Whitetop Beaksedge's bracts, it extends ony onto the bracts' bases, no farther than a spikelet's length.

== Distribution ==
In the US, showy whitetop beaksedge is native to central and eastern Texas, especialy in the Edwards Plateau region, and southeastern and southern Oklahoma. In northeastern Mexico it occurs in Coahuila state.

== Habitat ==
In Texas showy whitetop beaksedge occurs in low, open, moist to wet areas of fens, meadows, seeps, creek beds and shores atop limestone, on basic soils.

== Ecology ==
Unlike most sedges, which are pollinated by wind, showy whitetop beaksedge is pollinated by insects attracted to the white flowers.

The U.S. Army Corps of Engineers classes Rhynchospora nivea as a "facultative wetland hydrophyte", indicating that usually the species occurs in wetlands, but may occur in non-wetland environments.

Rhynchospora nivea uses the C_{3} carbon fixation pathway.

== Taxonomy ==
Earlier, Rhynchospora nivea was placed in the genus Dichromena.

=== Etymology ===
The genus name Rhynchospora is from the Greek rhynchos, meaning "snout", and spora, meaning "seed". Thus "snout-seed", nicely describing the one-seeded achene-type fruit, which looks like a seed with a pointed cap-like "tubercle" atop it, of a different texture and color from the achene, and which whimsically could be referred to as a snout.

The species name nivea is the feminine form of the New Latin niveus, meaning "snow-white, snowy, of snow". This undoubtedly points to the most distinguishing feature of Rhynchospora nivea, its white spikelets.
