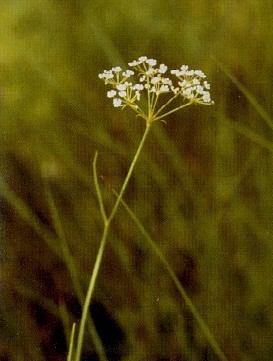
- Tiedemannia canbyi

Scientific classification
- Kingdom: Plantae
- Clade: Tracheophytes
- Clade: Angiosperms
- Clade: Eudicots
- Clade: Asterids
- Order: Apiales
- Family: Apiaceae
- Subfamily: Apioideae
- Tribe: Oenantheae
- Genus: Tiedemannia; DC.

= Tiedemannia =

Genus of flowering plants

Tiedemannia is a small genus of flowering plants in the carrot family known as cowbanes and dropworts. Species in this genus have been formerly classified in the genera Conium, Oenanthe, and Oxypolis.

As of 2020, Kew's Plants of the World Online accepts two species in the genus Tiedemannia:

- Tiedemannia canbyi (J.M.Coult. & Rose) Feist & S.R.Downie – Canby's cowbane, Canby's dropwort
- Tiedemannia filiformis (Walter) Feist & S.R.Downie – water cowbane, water dropwort
