= Tiedemannia filiformis =

Conservation status
- Secure (NatureServe)

Scientific classification
- Kingdom: Plantae
- Clade: Tracheophytes
- Clade: Angiosperms
- Clade: Eudicots
- Clade: Asterids
- Order: Apiales
- Family: Apiaceae
- Genus: Tiedemannia
- Species: T. filiformis

Binomial name
- Tiedemannia filiformis (Walter) Feist & S.R.Downie (2012)

Synonyms
- Oenanthe carolinensis Pers. (1805); Oenanthe filiformis Walter (1788); Oenanthe teretifolia Muhl. (1813); Oxypolis filiformis (Walter) Britton (1894); Peucedanum teretifolium Alph.Wood (1870); Sium teretifolium Elliott (1817); Tiedemannia teretifolia DC. (1830); Conium filifolium Vahl. (1794)

Species of flowering plant

Tiedemannia filiformis (syn. Oxypolis filiformis) is a species of flowering plant in the carrot family known by the common names water cowbane and water dropwort. It grows in swamps, freshwater wetlands, and along the borders of ponds in the southeastern United States, as far north as Delaware, as well as the northern Bahamian pineyards of the Bahamas.
