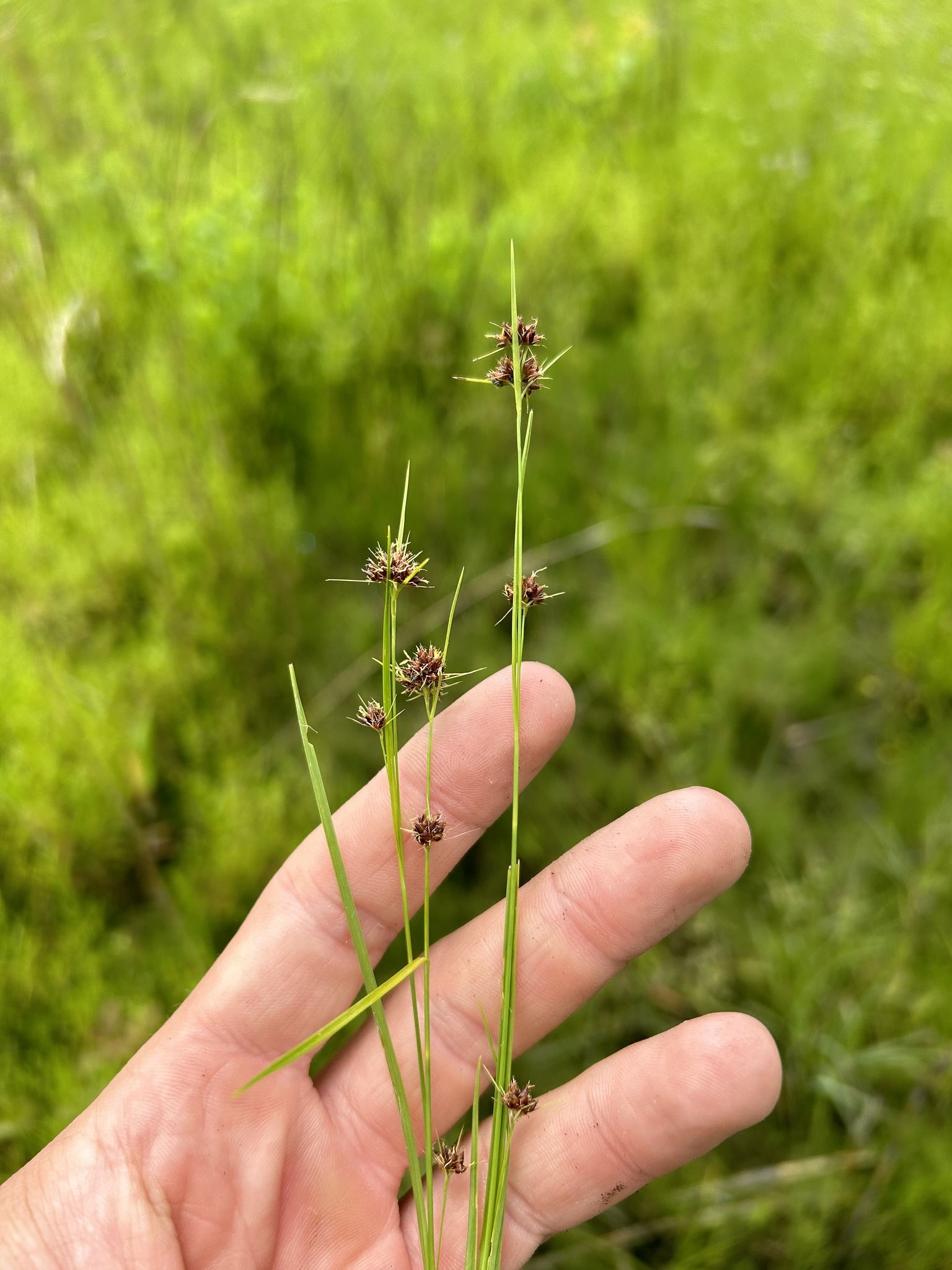

Scientific classification
- Kingdom: Plantae
- Clade: Tracheophytes
- Clade: Angiosperms
- Clade: Monocots
- Clade: Commelinids
- Order: Poales
- Family: Cyperaceae
- Genus: Rhynchospora
- Species: R. harveyi

Binomial name
- Rhynchospora harveyi W.Boott

= Rhynchospora harveyi =

Species of plant

Rhynchospora harveyi, commonly known as Harvey's beaksedge, is a perennial graminoid in the sedge family native to the Southern United States.

== Description ==
Rhynchospora harveyi harveyi is a clump-forming sedge that grows 70–110 cm tall and lacks rhizomes. Culms are slender, upright to slightly curved, and weakly three-angled. Leaves are mostly clustered at the base of the stem, spreading to ascending, and shorter than the stem. Leaf blades are narrow (1–3 mm wide), flat near the base and gradually becoming rolled and triangular toward the tip, ending in a sharp point. The inflorescence consists of 1 to 4 spikelet clusters that are dense to open and irregularly cone-shaped. These are borne on ascending stalks with spreading to erect branches, the final branches bearing many spikelets. Leafy bracts with bristle-like tips usually extend beyond most or all of the clusters. Spikelets are light reddish-brown to brown, broadly oval to lance-shaped, 3–4 mm long, with sharply pointed tips. Each spikelet usually contains one flower with about six barbed bristles that rarely reach the middle of the fruit. Fruits are dark brown, 2–2.5 mm long, and shaped from rounded to nearly spherical. Their surfaces are slightly wrinkled or nearly smooth, with tiny pit-like markings between the ridges. It bears resemblance to Rhynchospora grayi, but is found in less dry habitats than that species and has smaller achenes (2-2.5 mm long vs. 2.5-3 mm long in R. grayi).

== Distribution and habitat ==
Rhynchospora harveyi harveyi is distributed from southeastern Virginia south to northeastern Florida and the Florida panhandle, west to Texas and Oklahoma, and north in the interior to north-central Tennessee and Missouri. It grows in bogs in the Appalachian Mountains and Piedmont, in seepage bogs in the Carolina Sandhills, and in pine savannas on the Coastal Plain.
