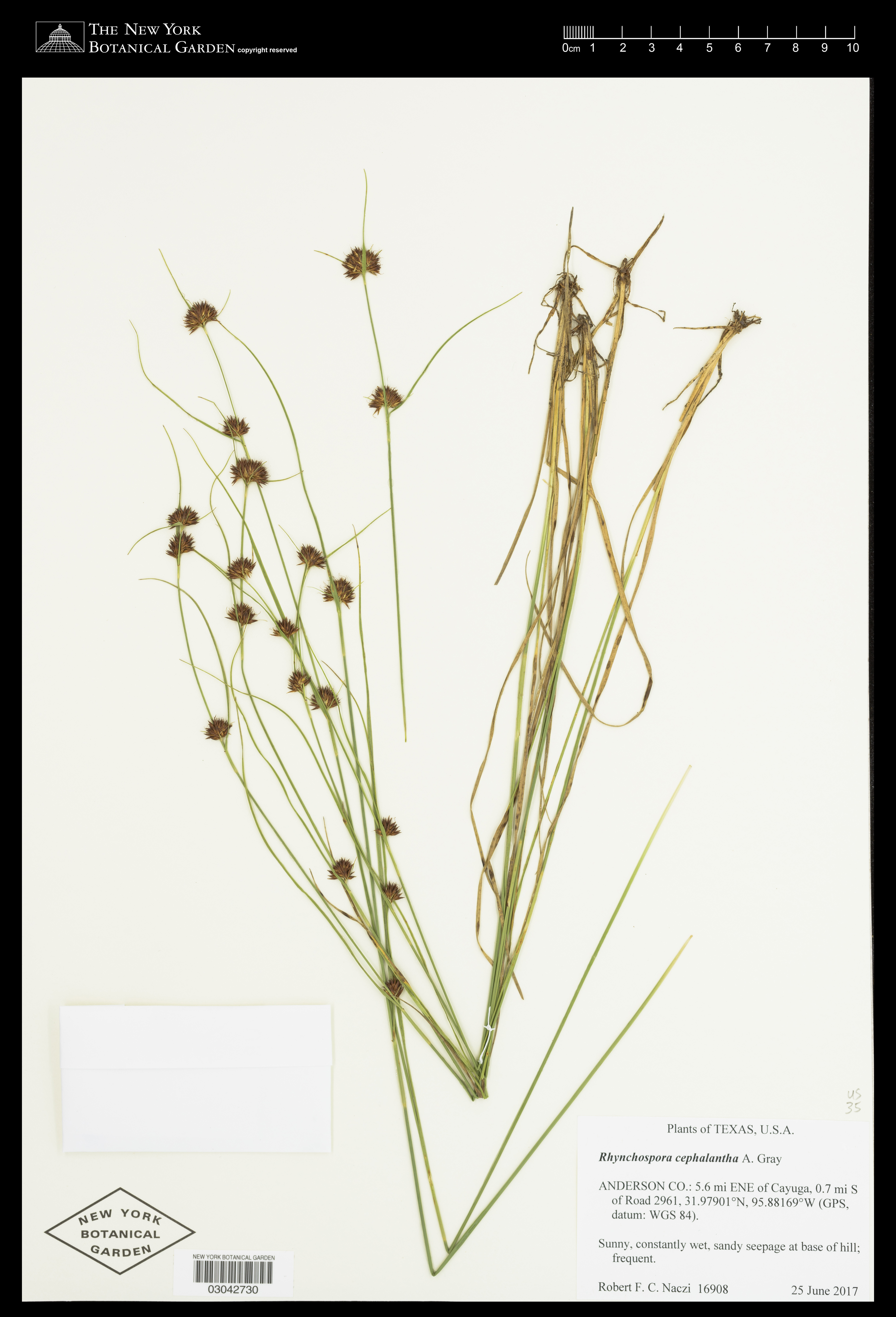

Scientific classification
- Kingdom: Plantae
- Clade: Tracheophytes
- Clade: Angiosperms
- Clade: Monocots
- Clade: Commelinids
- Order: Poales
- Family: Cyperaceae
- Genus: Rhynchospora
- Species: R. cephalantha

Binomial name
- Rhynchospora cephalantha A.Gray (1835)

Synonyms
- Synonymy: Rhynchospora biceps Torr. ex A.Gray (1835); Rhynchospora intermedia Beyr. ex Kunth (1837)

= Rhynchospora cephalantha =

Bunched beaksedge

Species of plant

Rhynchospora cephalantha, known by the common name of bunched beaksedge, is a member of the sedge family, Cyperaceae. It is a perennial herb, found throughout the eastern United States, from New York to Texas. It is geophytic.
