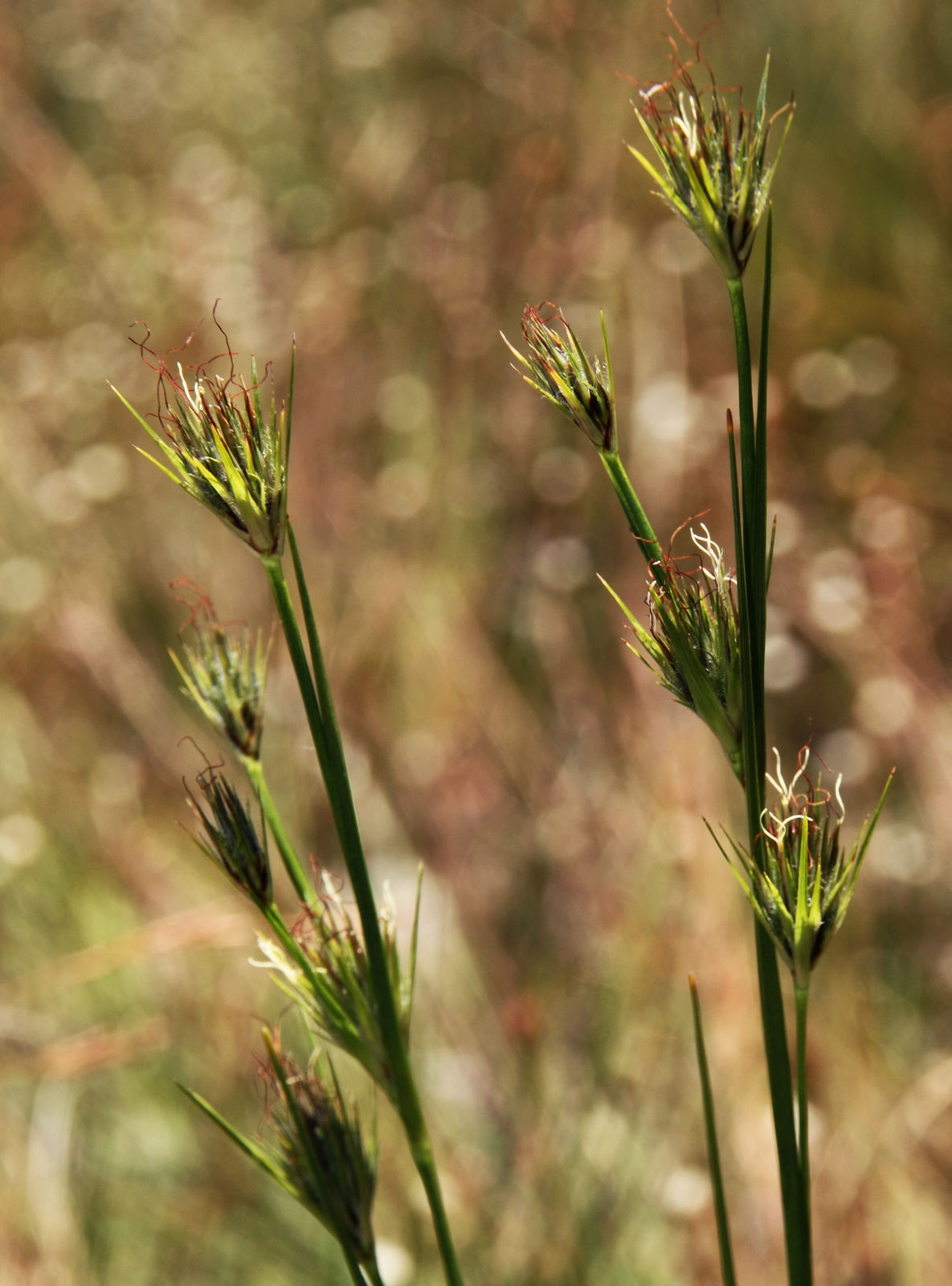

Scientific classification
- Kingdom: Plantae
- Clade: Tracheophytes
- Clade: Angiosperms
- Clade: Monocots
- Clade: Commelinids
- Order: Poales
- Family: Cyperaceae
- Genus: Rhynchospora
- Species: R. riedeliana

Binomial name
- Rhynchospora riedeliana C.B.Clarke (1908)

= Rhynchospora riedeliana =

Species of plant

Rhynchospora riedeliana is a member of the sedge family, Cyperaceae. It is a perennial herb, native to the state of Minas Gerais in Brazil.
