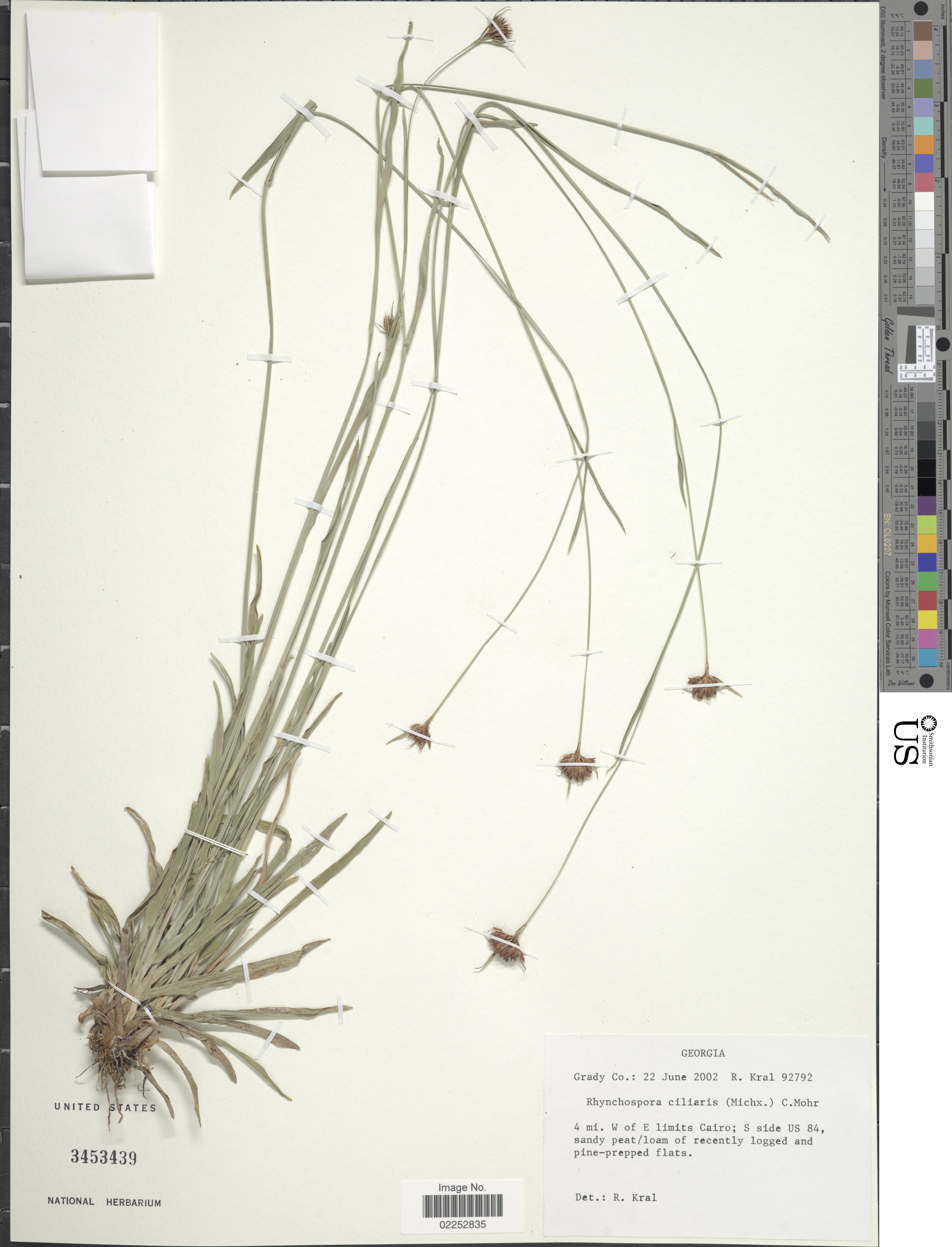

Scientific classification
- Kingdom: Plantae
- Clade: Tracheophytes
- Clade: Angiosperms
- Clade: Monocots
- Clade: Commelinids
- Order: Poales
- Family: Cyperaceae
- Genus: Rhynchospora
- Species: R. ciliaris

Binomial name
- Rhynchospora ciliaris (Michx.) C.Mohr (1901)

Synonyms
- Synonymy: Phaeocephalum ciliare (Michx.) House (1920); Rhynchospora ciliata Vahl (1805); Schoenus ciliaris Michx. (1803); Rhynchospora rappiana Small (1933)

= Rhynchospora ciliaris =

Fringed beaksedge

Species of plant

Rhynchospora ciliaris, known by the common name of fringed beaksedge, is a member of the sedge family, Cyperaceae. It is a perennial herb, found in wetlands of the southeastern United States, from New Orleans to Morehead City.

Rhynchospora ciliaris grows approximately 36 inches tall, and may be found in bogs, seeps, or depressions in open pastures or pinelands. Its dark brown spikelets bloom from May through November.
