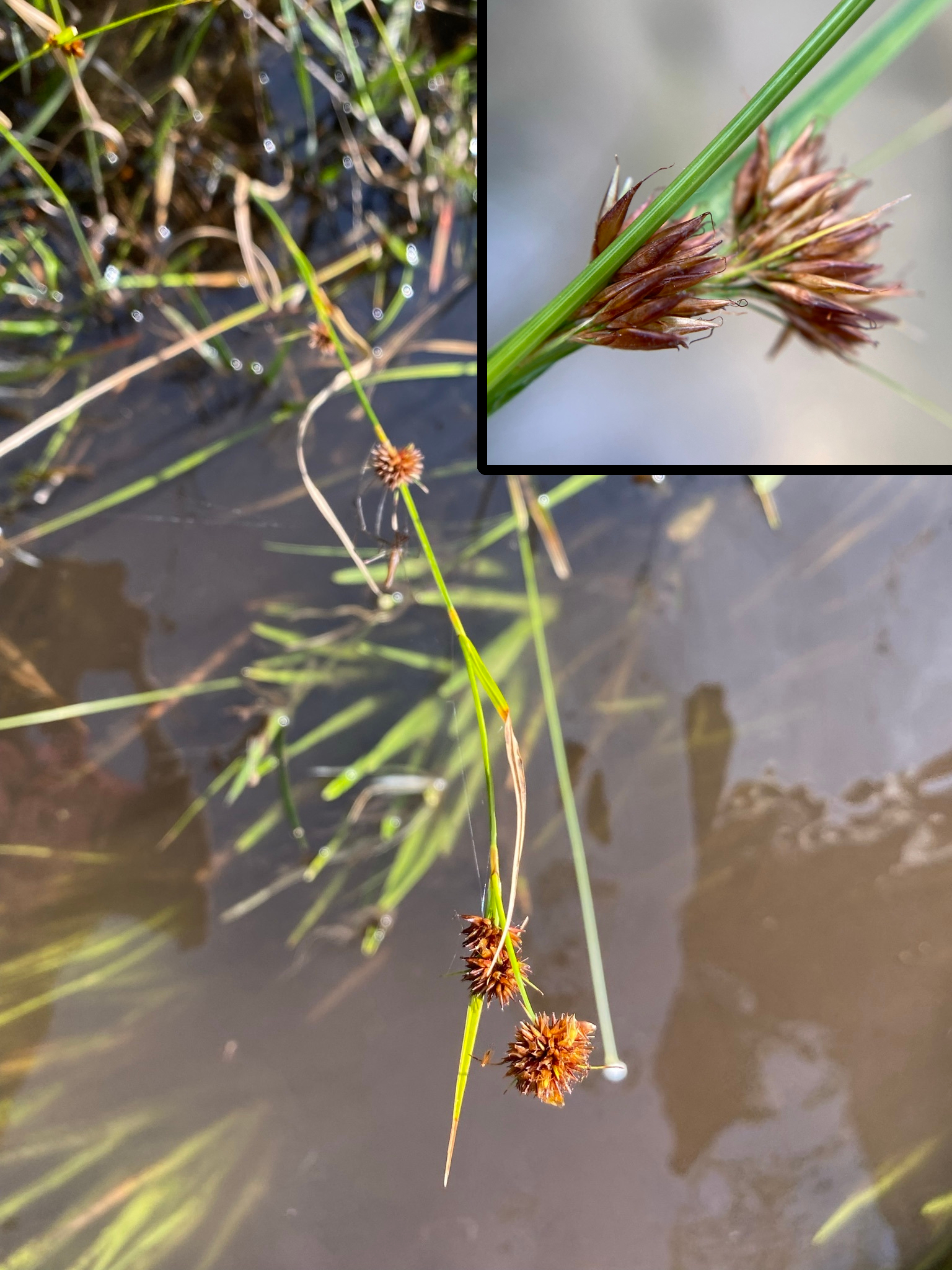

Scientific classification
- Kingdom: Plantae
- Clade: Tracheophytes
- Clade: Angiosperms
- Clade: Monocots
- Clade: Commelinids
- Order: Poales
- Family: Cyperaceae
- Genus: Rhynchospora
- Species: R. chalarocephala

Binomial name
- Rhynchospora chalarocephala Fernald & Gale (1940)

Synonyms
- None

= Rhynchospora chalarocephala =

Loosehead beaksedge

Species of plant

Rhynchospora chalarocephala, known by the common name of loosehead beaksedge, is a member of the sedge family, Cyperaceae. It is a perennial herb, found throughout the southeastern and Mid-Atlantic United States, from New Jersey to Texas.

R. chalarocephala specimens have been observed in habitat types such as pine savannas, bogs, swamps, and oak-hickory woodlands, among other types of environment. Individuals have also occurred in disturbed areas as well, such as within roadside ditches or along hiking trails.
