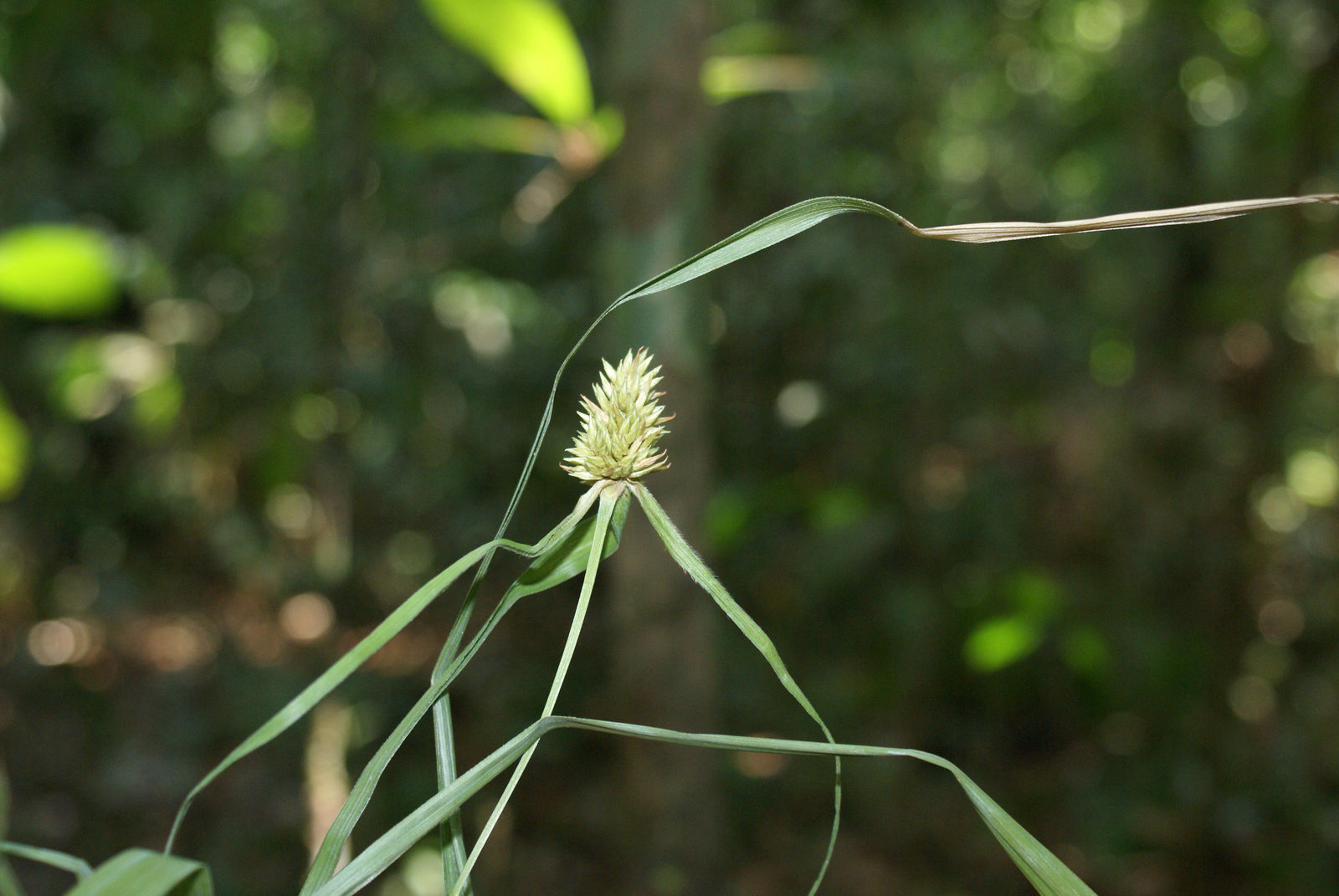

Scientific classification
- Kingdom: Plantae
- Clade: Tracheophytes
- Clade: Angiosperms
- Clade: Monocots
- Clade: Commelinids
- Order: Poales
- Family: Cyperaceae
- Genus: Rhynchospora
- Species: R. cephalotes

Binomial name
- Rhynchospora cephalotes (L.) Vahl (1805)

Synonyms
- Synonymy: Dichromena schoenus J.F.Macbr. (1931); Schoenus cephalotes (L.) Rottb. (1773); Scirpus cephalotes L. (1762); Rhynchospora conica Desv. (1825); Scleria fasciculata Willd. ex Kunth (1837)

= Rhynchospora cephalotes =

Species of plant

Rhynchospora cephalotes is a member of the sedge family, Cyperaceae. It is a perennial herb, found throughout the tropics of Central and South America, from southern Mexico and western Cuba in the northern extreme to Bahia and Bolivia in the southern extreme.
