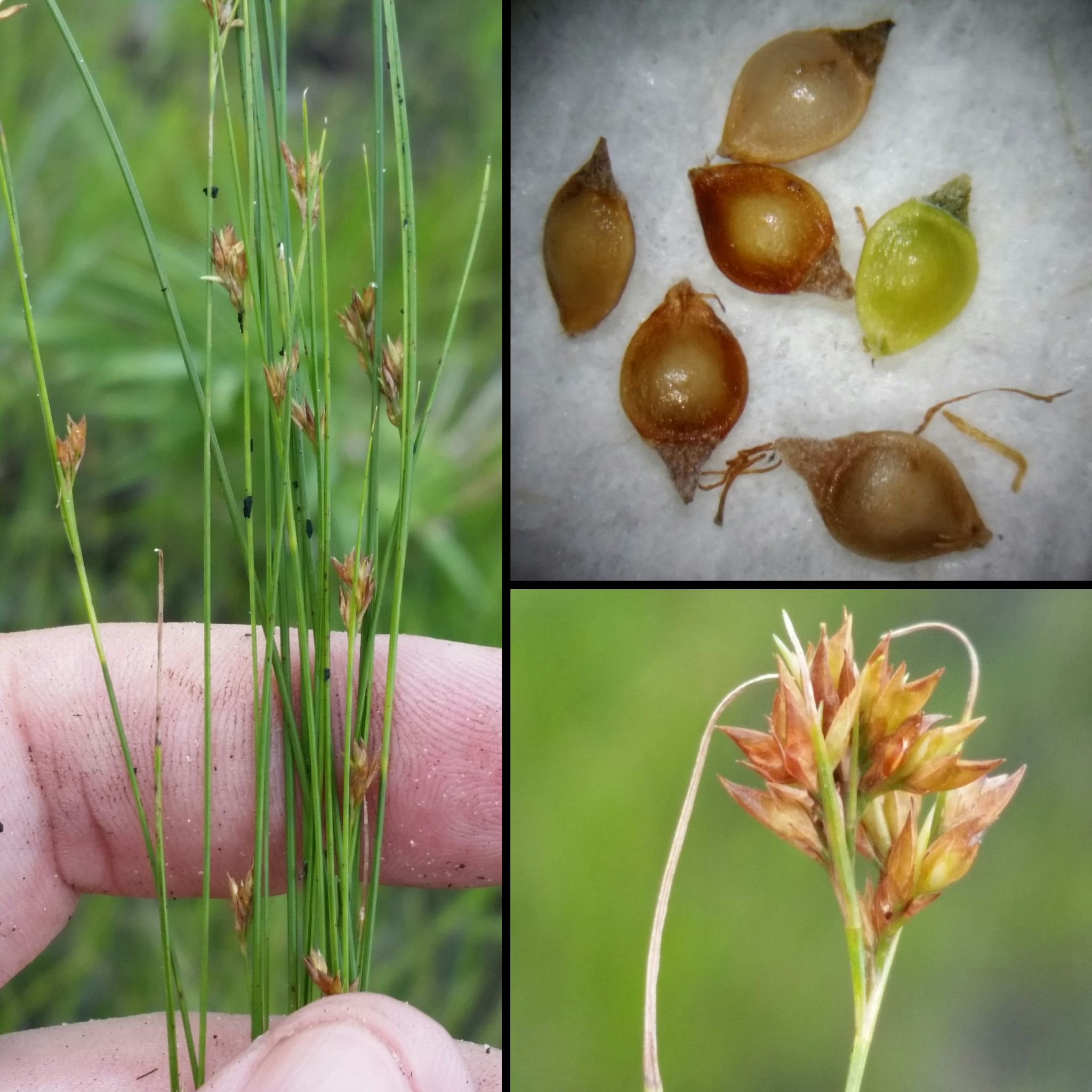

Scientific classification
- Kingdom: Plantae
- Clade: Tracheophytes
- Clade: Angiosperms
- Clade: Monocots
- Clade: Commelinids
- Order: Poales
- Family: Cyperaceae
- Genus: Rhynchospora
- Species: R. brachychaeta

Binomial name
- Rhynchospora brachychaeta C.Wright (1871)

Synonyms
- Synonymy: Phaeocephalum brachychaetum House (1920); Rhynchospora blauneri Britton (1923)

= Rhynchospora brachychaeta =

West Indian beaksedge

Species of plant

Rhynchospora brachychaeta, known by the common name of West Indian beaksedge, is a member of the sedge family, Cyperaceae. It is a perennial herb, found in wetlands of the southeastern United States, the Caribbean, Central America, and Guyana.

Rhynchospora brachychaeta grows up to 20 inches tall, and may be found in pine savannas or savanna bogs, especially in moist areas where sandy soil has been recently disturbed. Its reddish-brown spikelets bloom from May through November.
