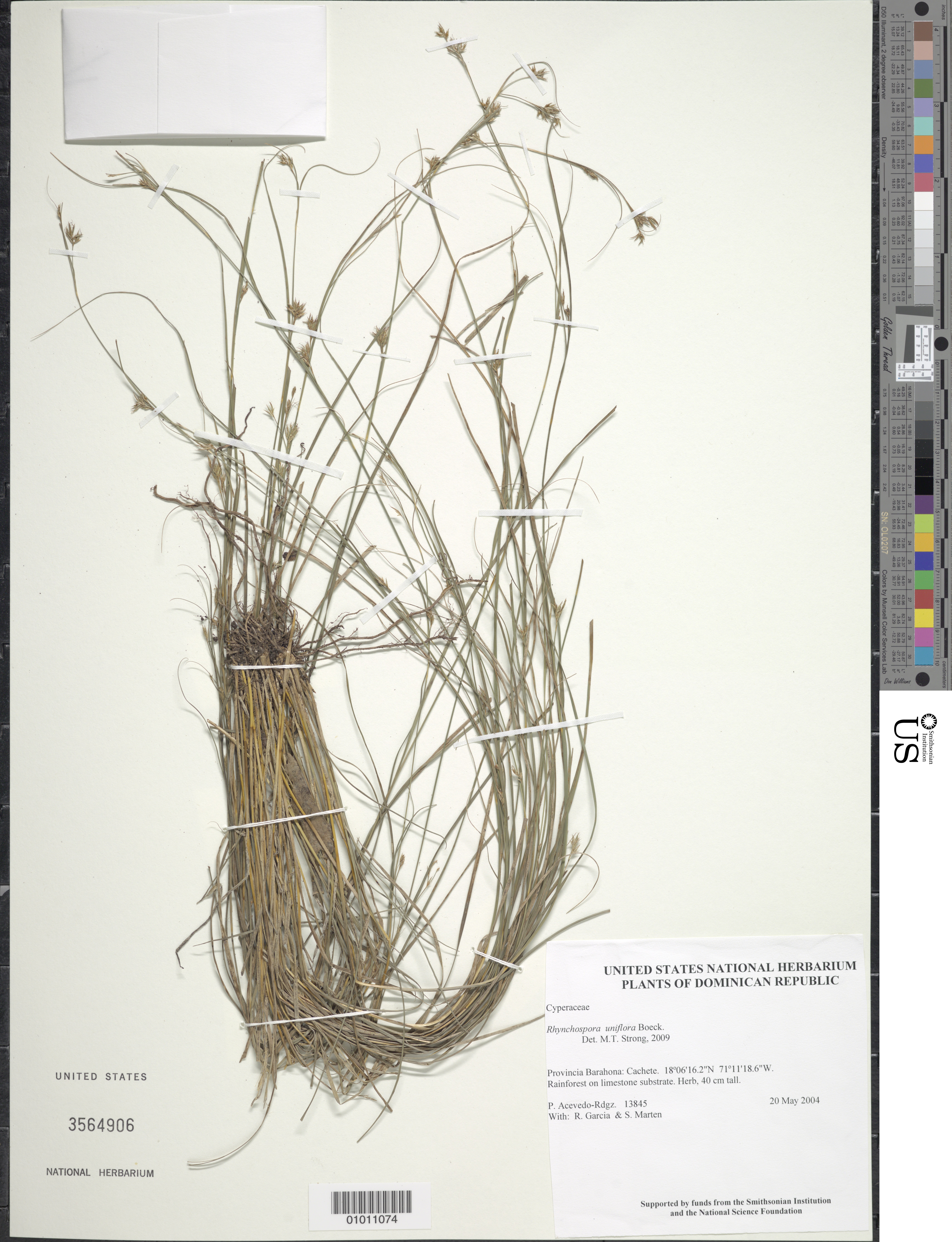

Scientific classification
- Kingdom: Plantae
- Clade: Tracheophytes
- Clade: Angiosperms
- Clade: Monocots
- Clade: Commelinids
- Order: Poales
- Family: Cyperaceae
- Genus: Rhynchospora
- Species: R. biflora

Binomial name
- Rhynchospora biflora Boeckeler (1871)

Synonyms
- Synonymy: Rhynchospora alpina Palla (1908); Rhynchospora cryptantha C.B.Clarke (1908); Rhynchospora ekmanii Urb. (1921); Rhynchospora elongata Boeckeler (1888); Rhynchospora sororopana Steyerm. (1951); Rhynchospora uniflora Boeckeler (1880)

= Rhynchospora biflora =

Twoflower beaksedge

Species of plant

Rhynchospora biflora, known by the common name of twoflower beaksedge, is a member of the sedge family, Cyperaceae. It is a perennial herb, found in rainforests of the Caribbean, Colombia, and Venezuela, as well as southeastern Brazil.
