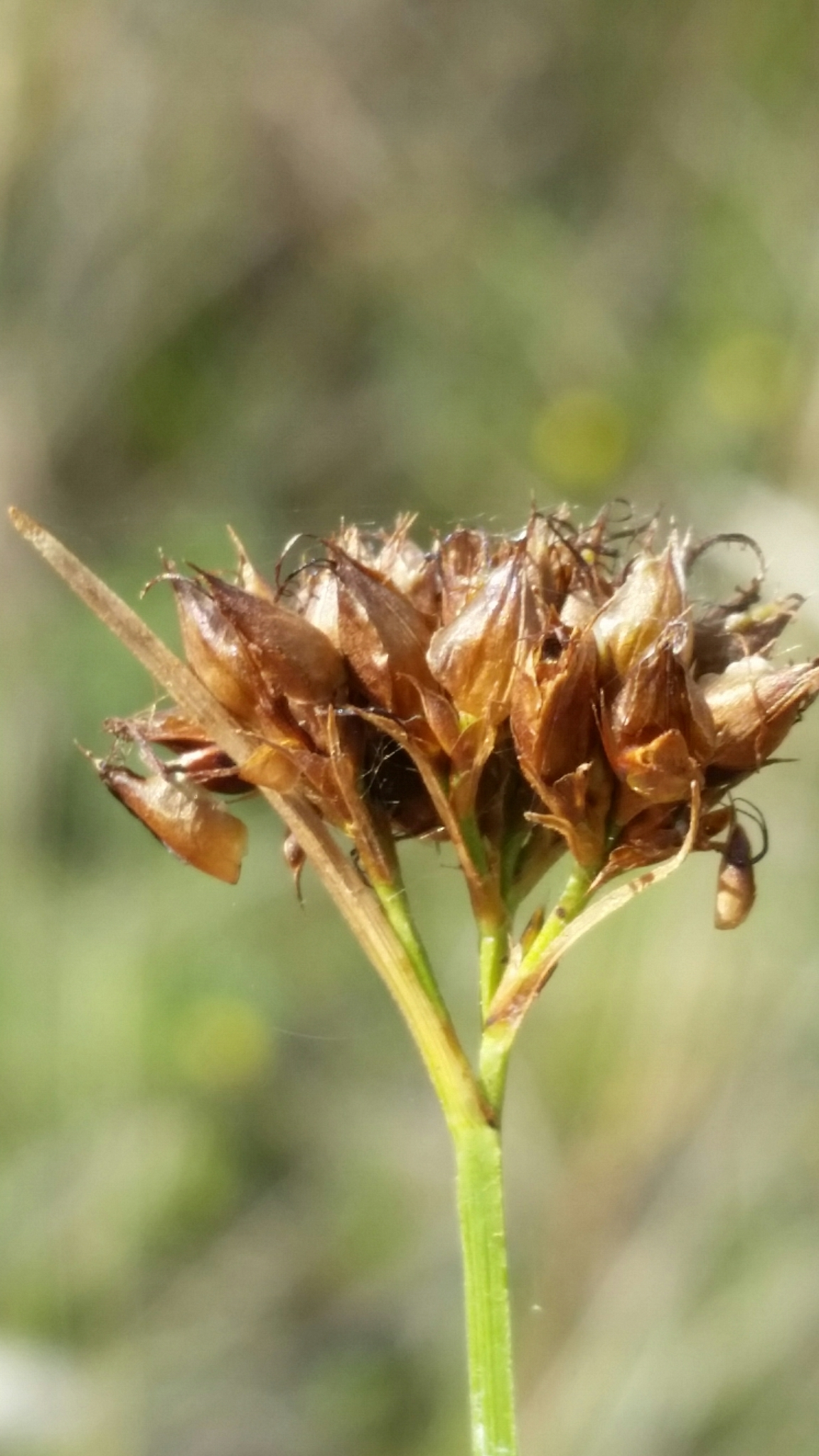

Scientific classification
- Kingdom: Plantae
- Clade: Tracheophytes
- Clade: Angiosperms
- Clade: Monocots
- Clade: Commelinids
- Order: Poales
- Family: Cyperaceae
- Genus: Rhynchospora
- Species: R. baldwinii

Binomial name
- Rhynchospora baldwinii A.Gray (1835)

Synonyms
- Synonymy: Phaeocephalum baldwinii (A.Gray) House (1920); Rhynchospora glauca Baldwin ex A.Gray (1835)

= Rhynchospora baldwinii =

Baldwin's beaksedge

Species of plant

Rhynchospora baldwinii, known by the common name of Baldwin's beaksedge, is a member of the sedge family, Cyperaceae. It is found in riverbanks and swampland near the coasts of the southeastern United States, as far west as New Orleans and as far north as Morehead City in North Carolina.
