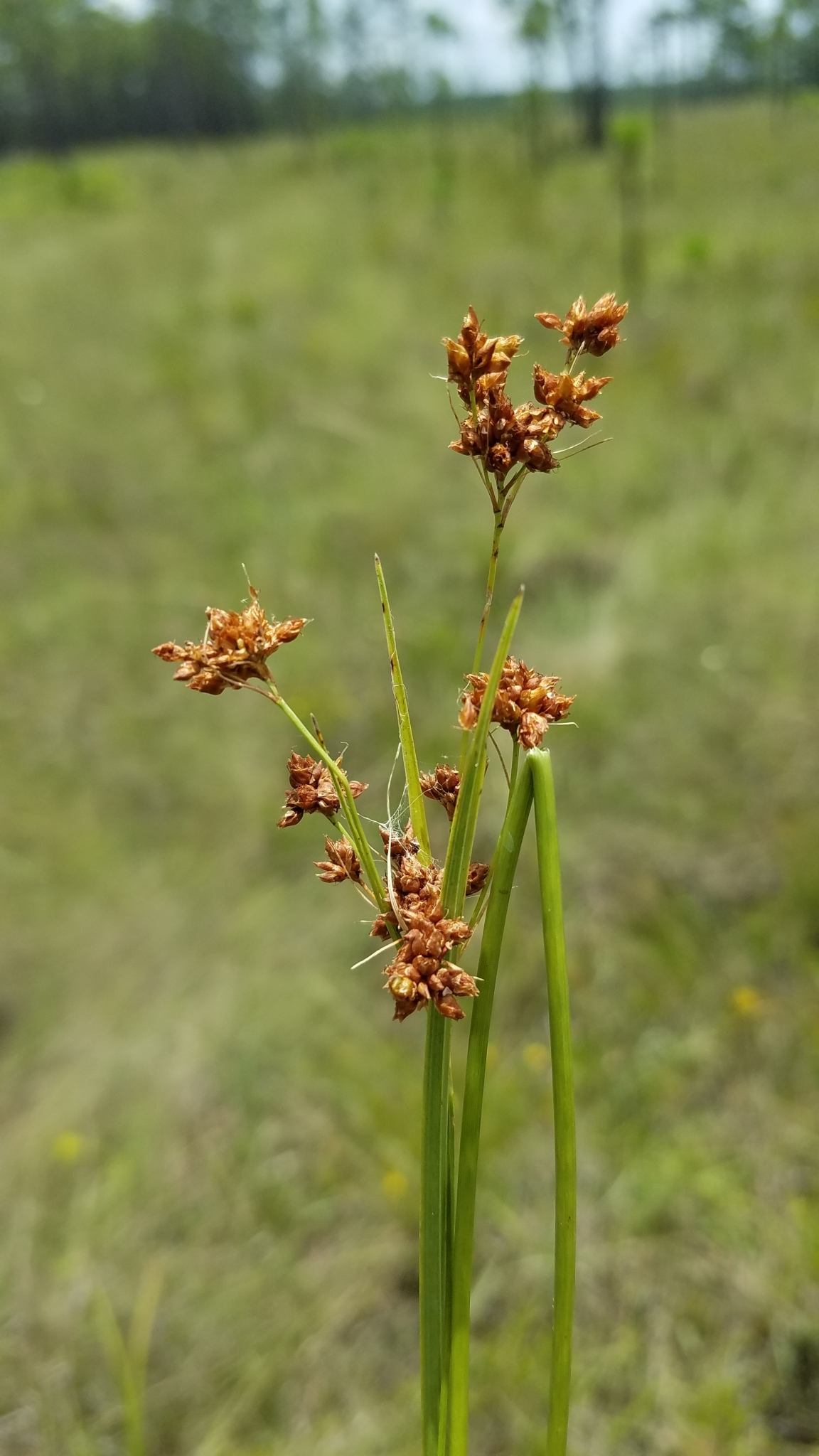

Scientific classification
- Kingdom: Plantae
- Clade: Tracheophytes
- Clade: Angiosperms
- Clade: Monocots
- Clade: Commelinids
- Order: Poales
- Family: Cyperaceae
- Genus: Rhynchospora
- Species: R. compressa

Binomial name
- Rhynchospora compressa J.Carey ex Chapm. (1860)

Synonyms
- Synonymy: Phaeocephalum compressum (J.Carey ex Chapm.) House (1920); Rhynchospora cymosa var. compressa (J.Carey ex Chapm.) C.B.Clarke (1892)

= Rhynchospora compressa =

Flatfruit beaksedge

Species of plant

Rhynchospora compressa, known by the common name of flatfruit beaksedge, is a member of the sedge family, Cyperaceae. It is a perennial herb, found in wetlands of the southeastern United States, primarily along the northeastern Gulf Coast.

R. compressa grows approximately 5 ft (1.5 m) tall, and may be found in moist sands or peats near bogs, in savannas, or in pinelands. Its dark brown spikelets bloom from May through November.
