= Rhynchospora miliacea =

Scientific classification
- Kingdom: Plantae
- Clade: Tracheophytes
- Clade: Angiosperms
- Clade: Monocots
- Clade: Commelinids
- Order: Poales
- Family: Cyperaceae
- Genus: Rhynchospora
- Species: R. miliacea

Binomial name
- Rhynchospora miliacea (Lam.) A. Gray

Species of plant

Rhynchospora miliacea, commonly known as millet beaksedge, is a perennial graminoid in the sedge family.

== Description ==
Rhynchospora miliacea grows in clumps up to 150 cm tall and spreads by slender, stolon-like rhizomes. The stems are soft, slender, and somewhat wand-like, round to slightly angled, and leafy along their length. Leaves are ascending and flat, 4–10 mm wide, and taper to a short, three-angled point. They are usually shorter than the flowering stems. The inflorescence consists of 4–6 or more spikelet clusters spaced evenly along the stem, each on an ascending stalk. The clusters are loose, open, and rounded, with thin, spreading branches. Spikelets are light brown, 2.5–3.5 mm long, and ellipsoid to lance- or egg-shaped, each with ovate, 2–3 mm fertile scales. Flowers have six barbed bristles that typically extend beyond the small, flattened tubercle at the top of the fruit. Each spikelet bears 2 or more fruits, which are pale brown, broadly rounded, and slightly flattened on both sides. The surface is marked with sharp, wavy ridges and shallow, rectangular pits. The tubercle is small, depressed-conical, and edged with tiny bristles.

== Distribution and habitat ==
Rhynchospora miliacea is found in the southeastern United States and in the West Indies. In the United States, it is distributed from southeastern Virginia south to South Florida and west to East Texas. It grows in swamp forests, including maritime swamp forests.
