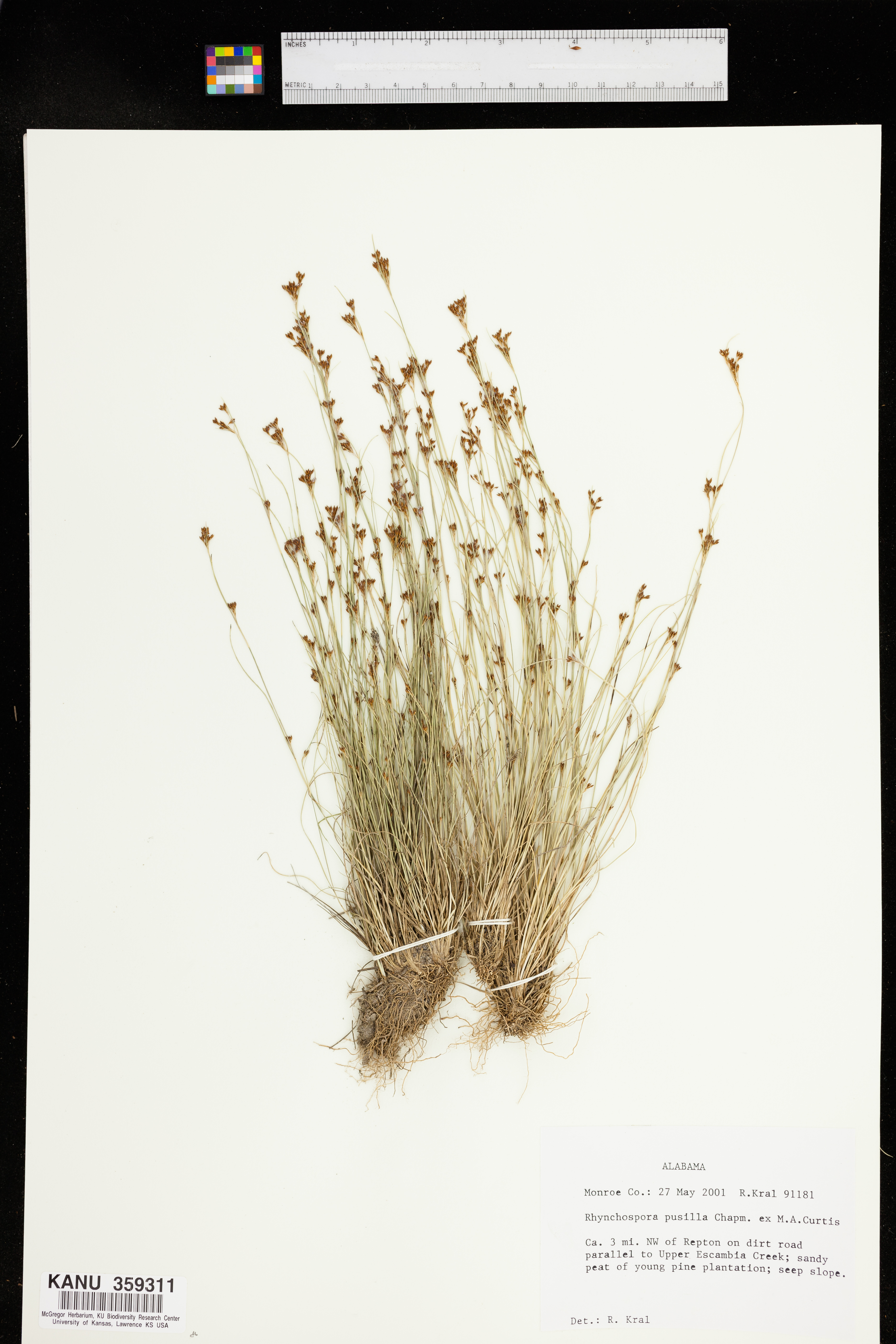

Scientific classification
- Kingdom: Plantae
- Clade: Tracheophytes
- Clade: Angiosperms
- Clade: Monocots
- Clade: Commelinids
- Order: Poales
- Family: Cyperaceae
- Genus: Rhynchospora
- Species: R. berteroi

Binomial name
- Rhynchospora berteroi (Spreng.) C.B.Clarke (1900)

Synonyms
- Synonymy: Hypolytrum berteroi Spreng. (1820); Dichromena filiformis C.B.Clarke (1900); Dichromena pusilla (Sw.) Kunth (1837); Hypolytrum berteroanum Schult. (1824); Kyllinga brevifolia Schult. (1824); Rhynchospora berteroana Boeckeler (1858); Rhynchospora nervosa var. subfiliformis (H.Pfeiff.) Kük. (1951); Rhynchospora pusilla (Sw.) Griseb. (1857); Rhynchospora subfiliformis H.Pfeiff. (1940); Schoenus pusillus Sw. (1788); Scleria microdiscus Steud. (1855)

= Rhynchospora berteroi =

Little beaksedge

Species of plant

Rhynchospora berteroi, known by the common name of little beaksedge, is a member of the sedge family, Cyperaceae. It is a perennial herb, native to wetlands in the Caribbean islands and Belize, and also found in the southeastern United States.
