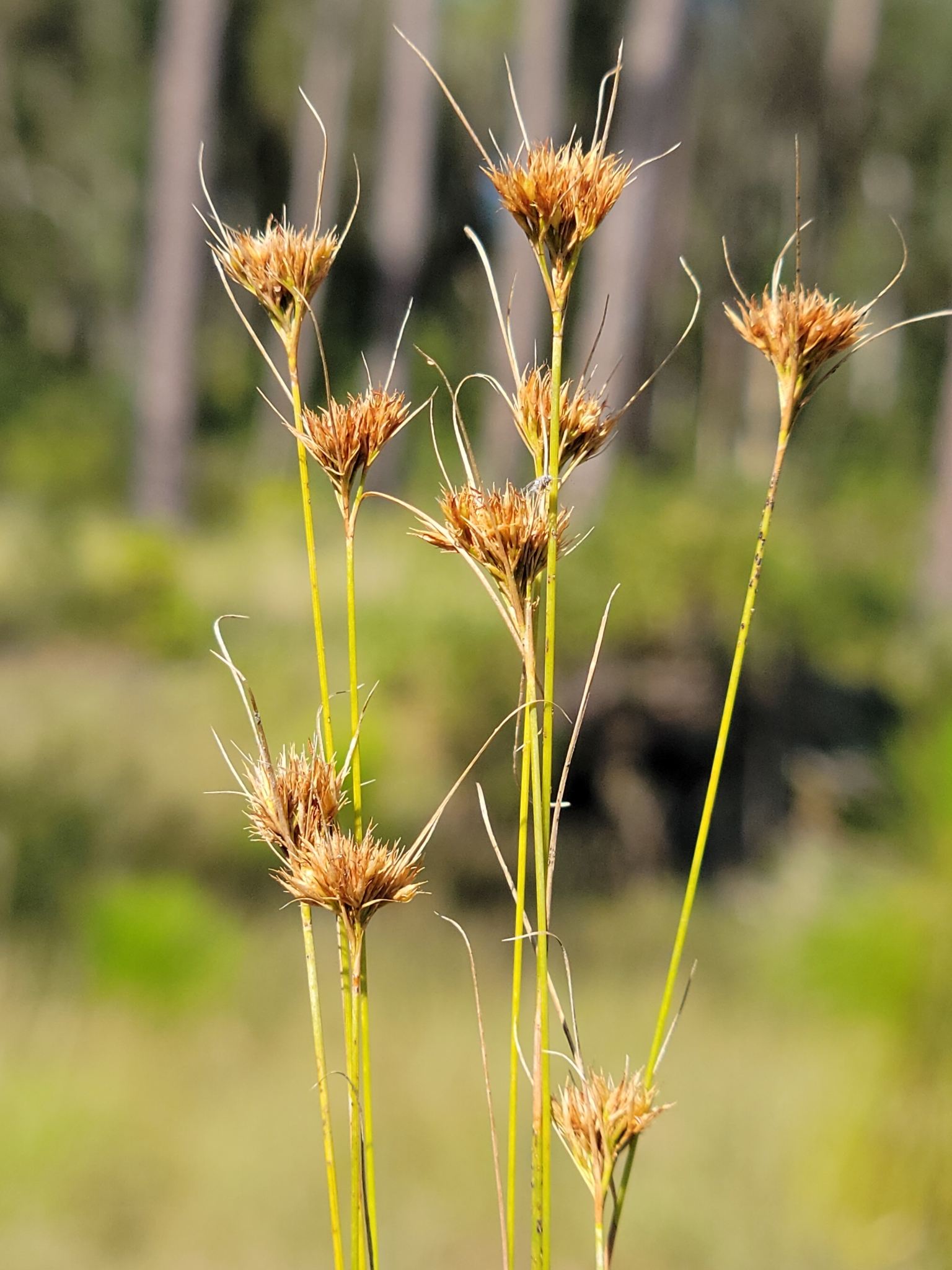

Scientific classification
- Kingdom: Plantae
- Clade: Tracheophytes
- Clade: Angiosperms
- Clade: Monocots
- Clade: Commelinids
- Order: Poales
- Family: Cyperaceae
- Genus: Rhynchospora
- Species: R. chapmanii

Binomial name
- Rhynchospora chapmanii M.A.Curtis (1841)

Synonyms
- Synonymy: Phaeocephalum chapmanii (M.A.Curtis) House (1920); Dichromena heterophylla Boeckeler (1858); Rhynchospora grayana Chapm. ex M.A.Curtis (1849); Rhynchospora heterophylla (Boeckeler) Boeckeler (1873)

= Rhynchospora chapmanii =

Chapman's beaksedge

Species of plant

Rhynchospora chapmanii, known by the common name of Chapman's beaksedge, is a member of the sedge family, Cyperaceae. It is a perennial herb, found in wetlands of the southeastern United States from North Carolina to Louisiana, as well as in Belize, Cuba, Honduras, and Nicaragua.

Rhynchospora chapmanii grows up to 28 inches tall, and is a common invasive species in pine savannas that have been recently logged or otherwise disturbed. Its brown spikelets bloom from June through November.
