= Rhynchospora plumosa =

Scientific classification
- Kingdom: Plantae
- Clade: Tracheophytes
- Clade: Angiosperms
- Clade: Monocots
- Clade: Commelinids
- Order: Poales
- Family: Cyperaceae
- Genus: Rhynchospora
- Species: R. plumosa

Binomial name
- Rhynchospora plumosa Elliott

Species of plant

Rhynchospora plumosa, commonly known as plumed beaksedge, is a perennial graminoid in the sedge family.

== Description ==
Rhynchospora plumosa grows 20–80 cm tall (but sometimes as short as 10 cm) and forms dense clumps without rhizomes. Stems are upright or slightly curved, slender and thread-like. Leaves are also slender—up to 1.5 mm wide—and shorter than the flowering stem, with rolled margins and tapering, three-angled tips. The base of the plant is pale to dull brown. Inflorescences consist of one or several dense or loose spikelet clusters. When several are present, they may be widely spaced and egg-shaped to hemispheric, or closely spaced and forming a lobed ellipse or cylinder. Each cluster is subtended by a fine, bristle-like bract that typically extends above the flowers. Spikelets are reddish to dark brown, spindle-shaped to oval, 3.5–4 mm long, with pointed tips. Each flower has six long, feather-like bristles and produces usually one reddish-brown, rounded to oval fruit (2–2.5 mm), with a finely wrinkled surface and a small, cone-shaped tubercle at the top.

== Distribution and habitat ==
Rhynchospora plumosa is found in the United States, the West Indies, Belize, Honduras, and Nicaragua. In the United States, it is distributed from North Carolina south to South Florida and west to southeastern Texas. It grows in pine savannas and sandhill-pocosin ecotones, especially in areas where the sandy surface dries out in summer.

== Ecology ==
In longleaf pine forests in the southeastern United States, Rhynchospora plumosa benefits from shorter fire return intervals and is common in the second winter following a fire. It was found in non-disturbed longleaf sites in North Carolina but not in highly disturbed sites, and shows resistance to regrowth in reestablished longleaf sites that were previously disturbed by heavy silvicultural practices.
