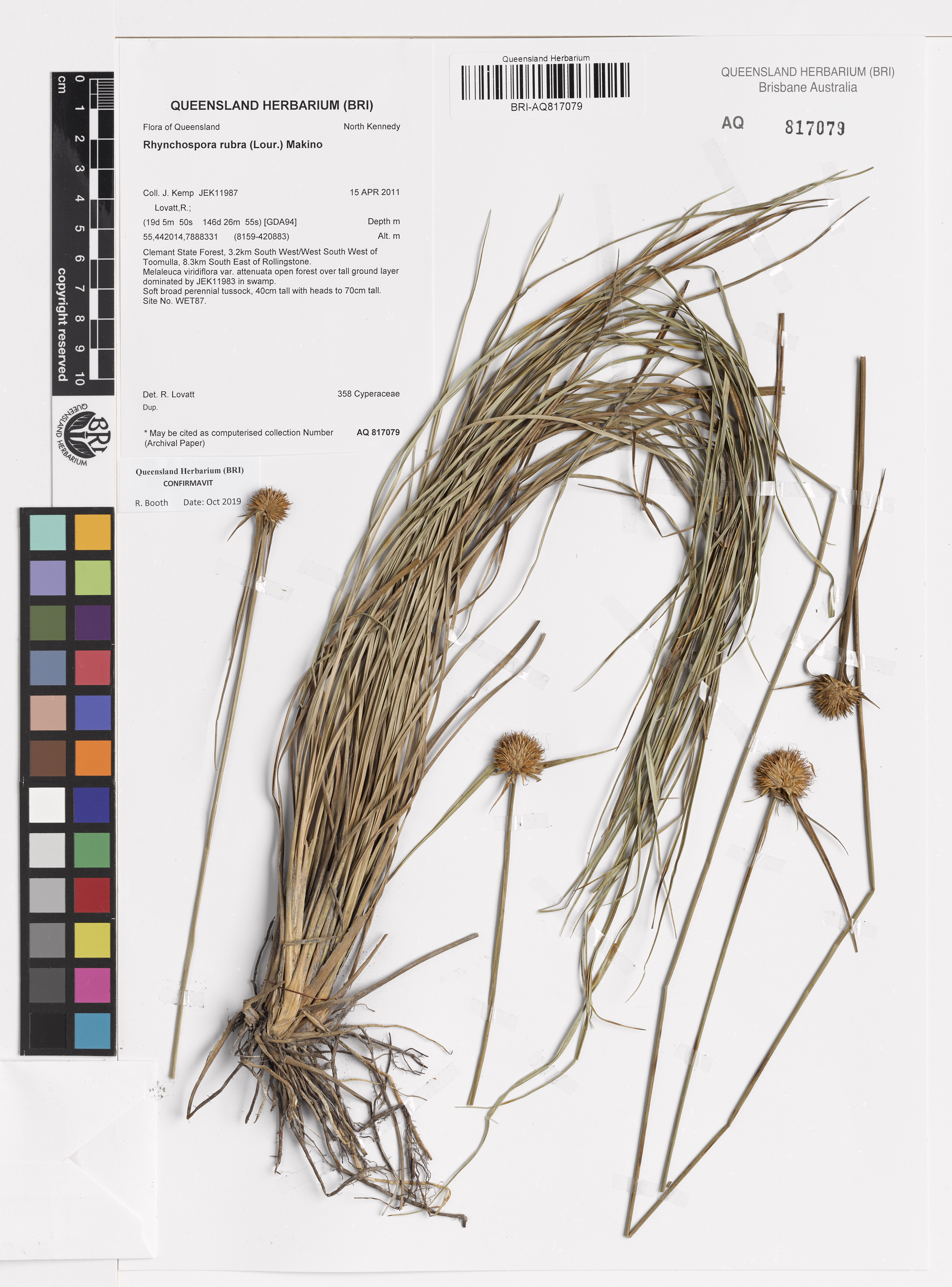

Scientific classification
- Kingdom: Plantae
- Clade: Tracheophytes
- Clade: Angiosperms
- Clade: Monocots
- Clade: Commelinids
- Order: Poales
- Family: Cyperaceae
- Genus: Rhynchospora
- Species: R. rubra

Binomial name
- Rhynchospora rubra (Lour.) Makino

Subspecies
- R. rubra subsp. africana J.Raynal (1967); R. rubra subsp. senegalensis J.Raynal (1967); R. rubra subsp. rubra (Lour.) Makino (1903)

Synonyms
- Schoenus ruber Lour.

= Rhynchospora rubra =

Species of plant

Rhynchospora rubra is a species of the sedge family, Cyperaceae. It is found throughout Asia, Australia, and western and southern Africa.

Rhynchospora rubra grows between 25 and 100 centimeters tall. It features a distinctive spherical spikelet at the end of its stem, a trait it shares with Rhynchospora holoschoenoides, but can be distinguished by the absence of spikelets on multiple branches, as R. rubra possesses only a single spikelet on its central stem.
