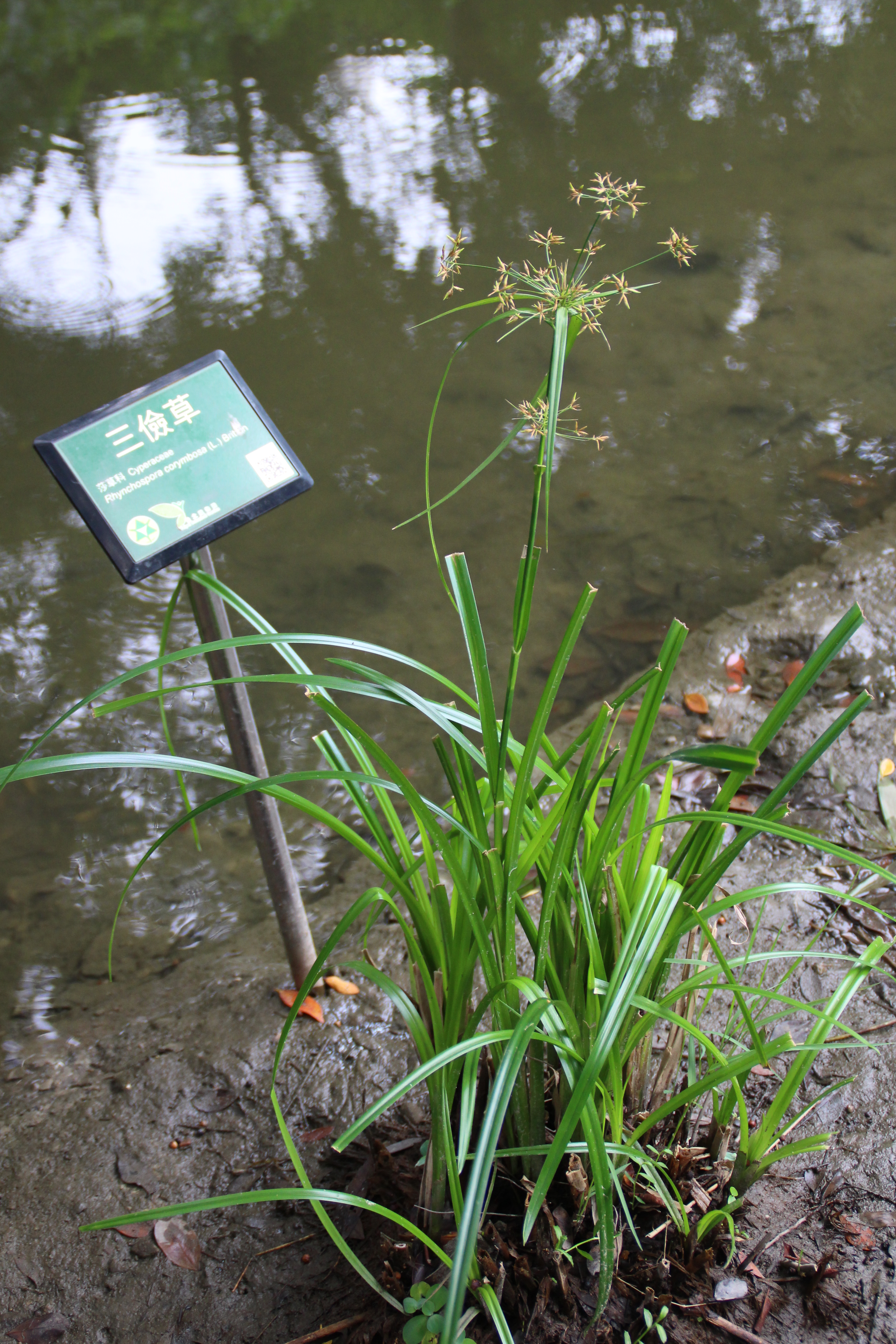

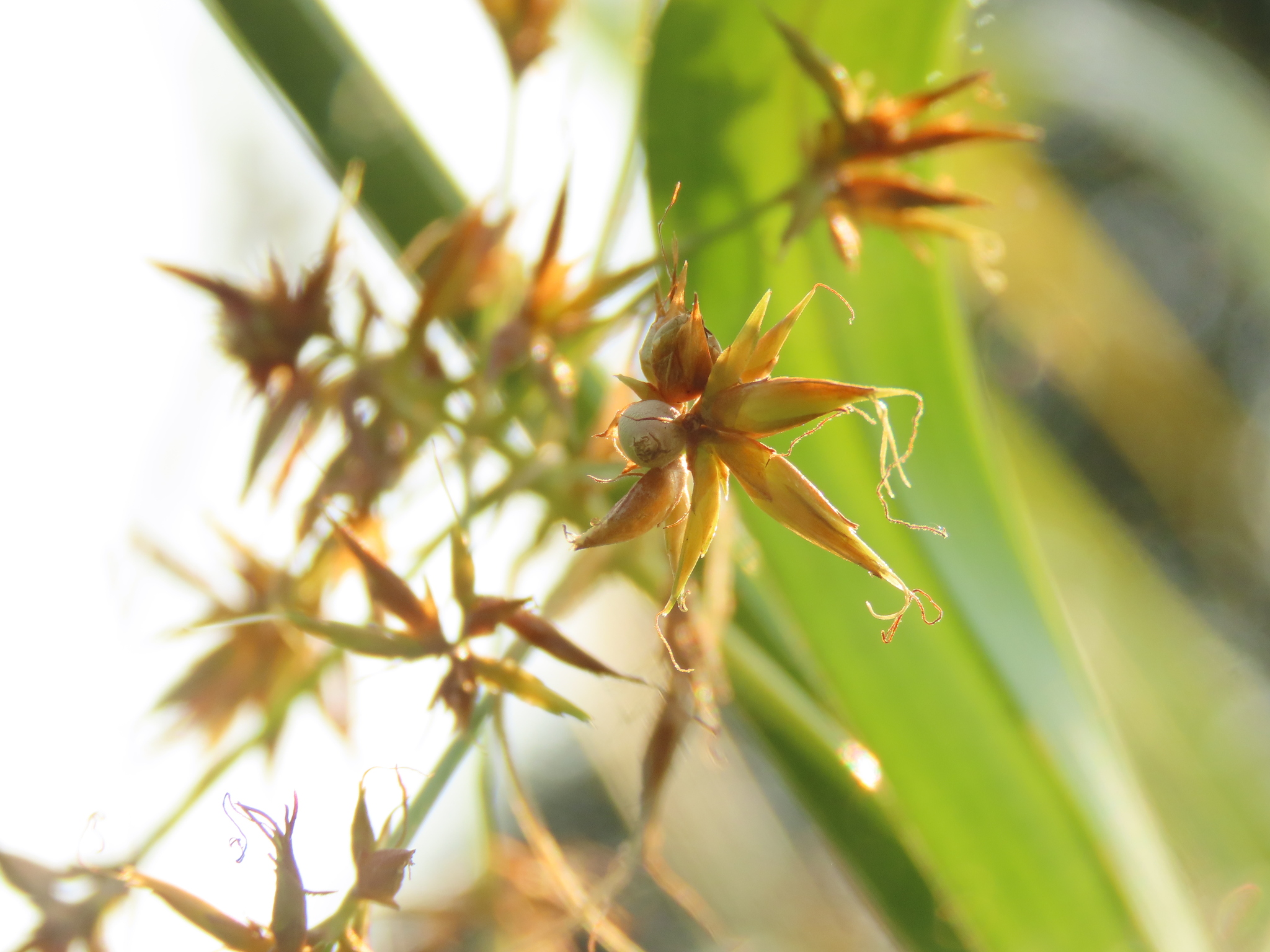

Conservation status
- Least Concern (IUCN 3.1)

Scientific classification
- Kingdom: Plantae
- Clade: Tracheophytes
- Clade: Angiosperms
- Clade: Monocots
- Clade: Commelinids
- Order: Poales
- Family: Cyperaceae
- Genus: Rhynchospora
- Species: R. corymbosa

Binomial name
- Rhynchospora corymbosa (L.) Britton (1892)

Synonyms
- Synonymy a: Chaetospora aurea Kunth (1816); Dichromena corymbosa (L.) J.F.Macbr. (1931); Rhynchospora aurea Vahl (1805); Schoenus corymbosus (L.) Pers. (1805); Scirpus corymbosus L. (1756); Calyptrostylis divergens Nees (1842); Calyptrostylis fascicularis Nees (1842); Calyptrostylis gaudichaudii Nees (1834); Calyptrostylis rudgei Nees (1834); Cephaloschoenus divergens Nees (1834); Rhynchospora corymbifera Nees (1841); Rhynchospora macrocarpa Boeckeler (1873); Rhynchospora schraderiana Steud. (1855); Rhynchospora spectabilis Hochst. ex C.Krauss (1845); Rhynchospora stokesii F.Br. (1931); Rhynchospora subulirostris Steud. (1855); Schoenus articulatus Roxb. (1820); Schoenus floridus Rudge (1805); Schoenus surinamensis Rottb. (1773); Scirpus bangalorensis B.Heyne ex Wall. (1831); Scirpus umbellatus Roxb. ex Kunth (1837)

= Rhynchospora corymbosa =

Golden beaksedge

Species of plant

Rhynchospora corymbosa, known by the common names of golden beaksedge and matamat, is a member of the sedge family, Cyperaceae. It is a perennial herb, found globally throughout the tropics. It grows up to 2 meters tall in riverbanks, shallow pools, and swamps.
