= Rhynchospora gracillima =

Scientific classification
- Kingdom: Plantae
- Clade: Tracheophytes
- Clade: Angiosperms
- Clade: Monocots
- Clade: Commelinids
- Order: Poales
- Family: Cyperaceae
- Genus: Rhynchospora
- Species: R. gracillima

Binomial name
- Rhynchospora gracillima Thwaites

Subspecies
- Rhynchospora gracillima subsp. gracillima; Rhynchospora gracillima subsp. subquadrata (Cherm.) J.Raynal

Species of sedge

Rhynchospora gracillima is a widespread species of sedge.

== Description ==
Rhynchospora gracillima is an annual or short lived perrenial sedge that may grow to be 20–60 cm (0.66–1.97 ft) tall. The 3-angled culms are smooth and densely tufted. The leaves are shorter than the culms and have stiff hairs. They are up to 1 mm (0.039 in) wide and tips are rough. The bracts have longitudinal grooves and sheath the leaves and culms.

The inflorescences are loosely branched. They are made of one to three clusters, with the outer flowers borne on longer stems than the central ones. The stems are up to 4 cm (1.6 in) long. The rays are smooth and often curve upwards. They are by supported by bristled bractlets. The solitary spikelets are narrow, elongated ovals. They have three or four flowers and long stems. There are seven or eight pale brownish glumes with purplish lines. They overlap and spiral. There are two stamens and two well-developed style branches per floret.

The morphology of the spikelets has been studied in more detail in Rhynchospora gracillima subsp. subquadrata. While there are usually seven or eight glumes, some specimens may have many as eleven. The central glumes (glumes four to nine) are the largest and best developed. They are noticeably spiraled with the internodes being enlarged, curved and flattened in order to accommodate the seeds. Glumes five to nine usually mature to form seeds, with glumes five, ten and eleven sometimes forming seeds. Glumes one through four are always infertile.

The fruit is a greyish white nutlet. It is biconvex with deep, wavy ridges.

== Distribution and habitat ==
This species has two subspecies. Rhynchospora gracillima subsp. gracillima is found growing from Asia to Oceania while Rhynchospora gracillima subsp. subquadrata grows in Africa, Madagascar and Mauritius. It grows in moist places, grassy slopes and forests. While it is mostly found growing at lowers altitudes, it has been found at altitudes of up to 1,200 m (3,900 ft) above sea level.

Rhynchospora gracillima is known to grow in Australia, Benin, Burkina Faso, Cameroon, the Central African Republic, China, Congo, the Democratic Republic of the Congo, Eswatini, Ethiopia, Gabon, Ghana, Guinea, India, Indonesia, Ivory Coast, Liberia, Madagascar, Mali, Nigeria, Papua New Guinea, Senegal, South Africa, Sri Lanka, Tanzania, Thailand, Togo, Uganda, Zambia and Zimbabwe. It is also suspected to occur in Angola, Burundi, Chad, Equatorial Guinea, Guinea-Bissau, Malawi, Mozambique, Rwanda, Sierra Leone, South Sudan and The Gambia.

== Conservation ==
This species is considered to be of least concern by the IUCN. It is widely distributed, and its population is stable.
