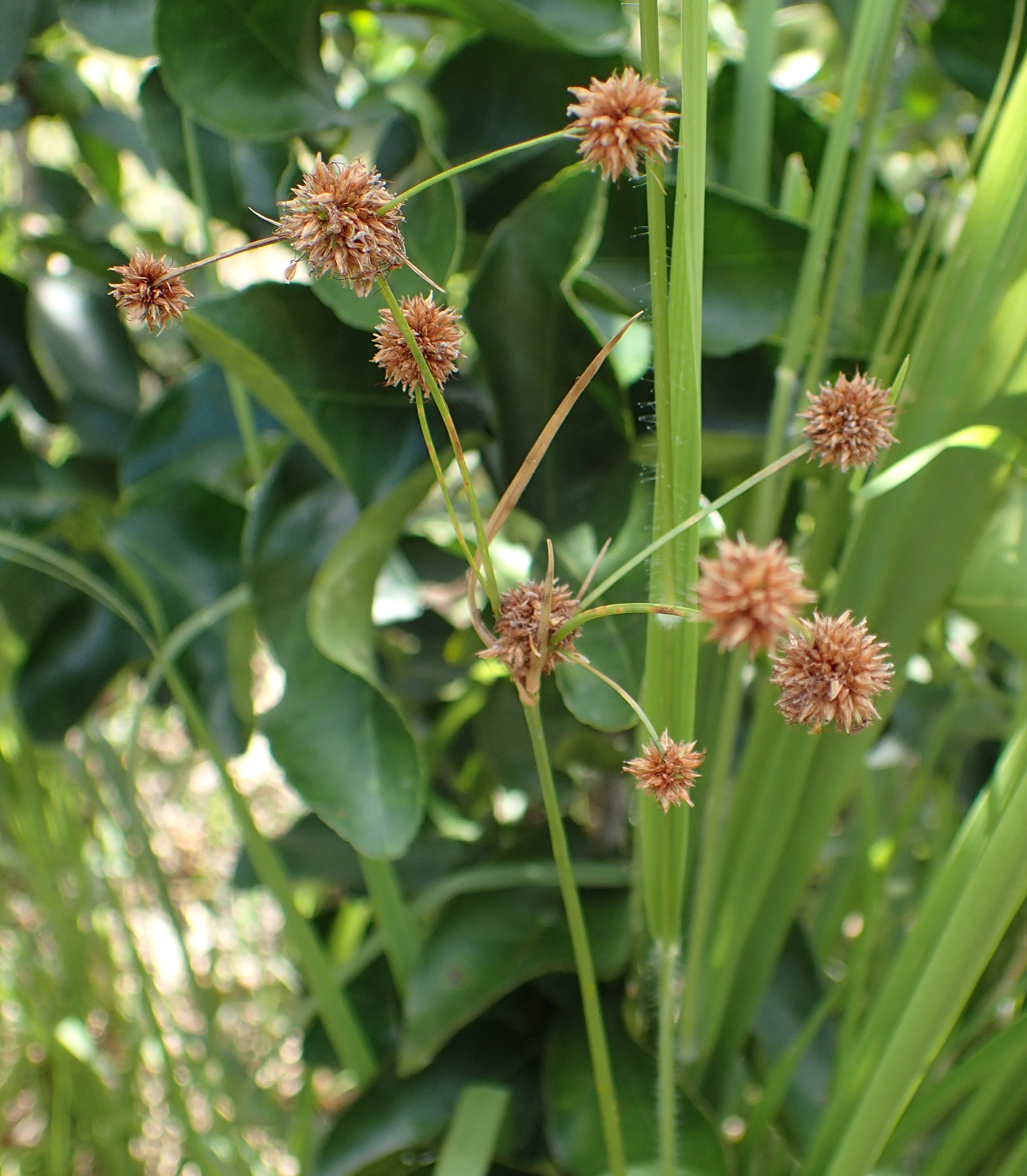

Conservation status
- Least Concern (IUCN 3.1)

Scientific classification
- Kingdom: Plantae
- Clade: Tracheophytes
- Clade: Angiosperms
- Clade: Monocots
- Clade: Commelinids
- Order: Poales
- Family: Cyperaceae
- Genus: Rhynchospora
- Species: R. holoschoenoides

Binomial name
- Rhynchospora holoschoenoides (Rich.) Herter (1953)

Synonyms
- Synonymy: Cephaloschoenus polycephalus Nees (1834); Ephippiorhynchium polycephalum (Nees) Nees (1842); Rhynchospora polycephala (Nees) Wydler ex Kunth (1837); Schoenus holoschoenoides Rich. (1792); Cephaloschoenus oligocephalus Hochst. (1845); Cephaloschoenus tenuirostris Nees (1834); Dichromena cyperoides (Mart.) J.F.Macbr. (1931); Ephippiorhynchium tenuirostre Nees (1842); Mariscus pilulifer G.Bertol. (1854); Rhynchospora arechavaletae Boeckeler (1888); Rhynchospora cyperoides Mart. (1824); Rhynchospora dolichostyla K.Schum. (1903); Rhynchospora globulifera Link (1820); Rhynchospora mauritii Steud. (1855); Rhynchospora ostenii Kük. (1914); Rhynchospora riedeliana Gand. (1919); Rhynchospora schoenoides Britton (1892); Rhynchospora sparganioides Bojer (1837); Rhynchospora sphaerocephala Boeckeler (1888); Rhynchospora tenuirostris (Nees) Kunth (1837); Rhynchospora triceps (Vahl) Hochst. (1845); Rhynchospora urvillei Steud. (1855); Schoenus cyperinus J.F.Gmel. (1792); Schoenus cyperoides Sw. (1788); Schoenus fragifer Rudge (1805); Schoenus globulifer (Link) Willd. ex Kunth (1837); Schoenus sparganioides Lindl. ex Kunth (1837); Schoenus triceps Vahl (1798); Scirpus muricatus Poir. (1805)

= Rhynchospora holoschoenoides =

Fly beaksedge

Species of plant

Rhynchospora holoschoenoides, known by the common name of fly beaksedge, is a member of the sedge family, Cyperaceae. It is a perennial herb, found throughout the Caribbean, Central and South America and western and southern Africa.

Rhynchospora holoschoenoides grows between 40 and 130 centimeters tall in swamps and ponds. It features distinctive spherical spikelets at the ends of its branches, a trait it shares with Rhynchospora rubra subsp. africana, but can be distinguished by the presence of spikelets on multiple branches, whereas R. rubra possesses only a single spikelet on its central stem.
