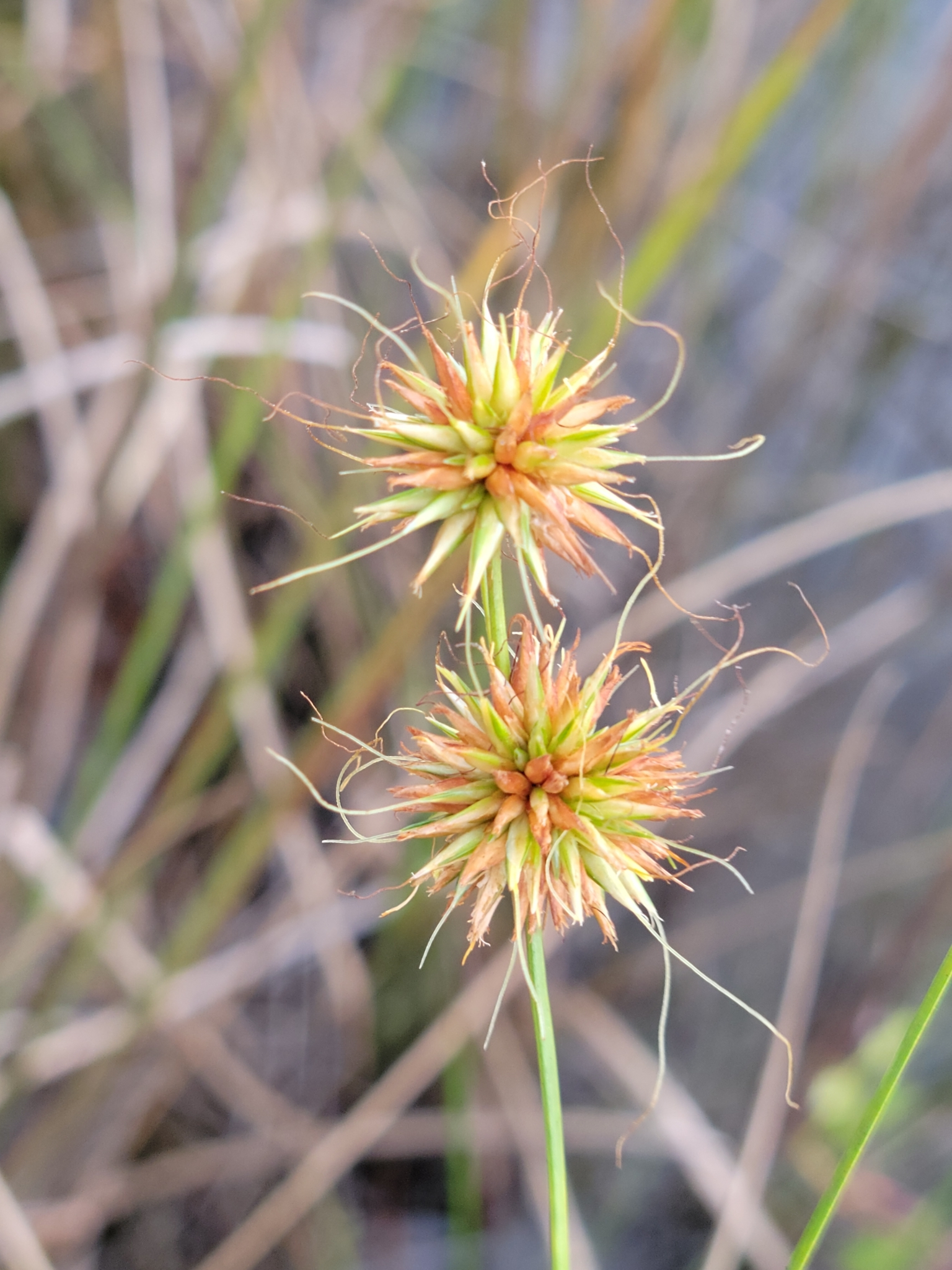

Scientific classification
- Kingdom: Plantae
- Clade: Tracheophytes
- Clade: Angiosperms
- Clade: Monocots
- Clade: Commelinids
- Order: Poales
- Family: Cyperaceae
- Genus: Rhynchospora
- Species: R. tracyi

Binomial name
- Rhynchospora tracyi Britton (1892)

Synonyms
- Ceratoschoenus capitatus Chapm. (1860); Phaeocephalum tracyi (Britton) House (1920); Rhynchospora hitchcockii Gand. (1919)

= Rhynchospora tracyi =

Tracy's beaksedge

Species of plant

Rhynchospora tracyi, known by the common name of Tracy's beaksedge, is a member of the sedge family, Cyperaceae. It is a perennial herb, native to the Southeastern United States, the Bahamas, Cuba, Belize, and Honduras.
