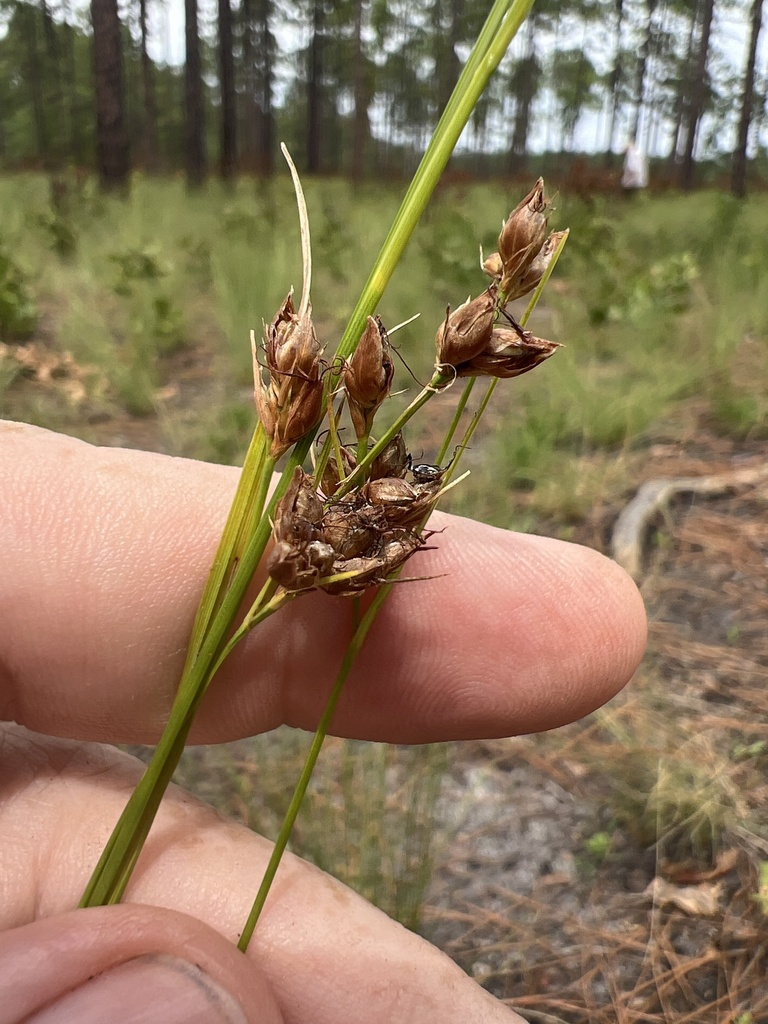

Scientific classification
- Kingdom: Plantae
- Clade: Tracheophytes
- Clade: Angiosperms
- Clade: Monocots
- Clade: Commelinids
- Order: Poales
- Family: Cyperaceae
- Genus: Rhynchospora
- Species: R. grayi

Binomial name
- Rhynchospora grayi Kunth

= Rhynchospora grayi =

Species of plant

Rhynchospora grayi, commonly known as Gray's beaksedge, is a perennial graminoid in the sedge family.

== Description ==
Rhynchospora grayi forms clumps, grows 10–100 cm tall, and lacks rhizomes. Culms are erect or slightly curved, slender, firm, and three-angled but not sharply so. Leaves are shorter than the stems, with narrow, flat bases that become triangular and taper to a sharp point. Leaf blades are 2–4 mm wide and spread outward or ascend along the stem. The inflorescence consists of 1 to 4 spikelet clusters that are loose to dense and broadly cone-shaped or rounded. These clusters sit on ascending stalks and are often overtopped by leafy bracts. Spikelets are light reddish-brown, ellipsoid or narrowly egg-shaped, 4–5 mm long, with sharply pointed tips. Each flower has around six bristles that are finely barbed and extend from the middle of the fruit to or beyond the tip of the tubercle. Fruits are typically single per spikelet, dark brown, 2.5–3 mm long, with a swollen, rounded body and a small, conical tubercle at the top. The fruit surface may appear smooth but has fine crosswise ridges or pits. It is one of the only beaksedges that can be found in dry and xeric uplands, which is a helpful identification clue.

== Distribution and habitat ==
Rhynchospora grayi is distributed from southeastern Virginia south to South Florida. It is also found in Cuba. It grows in longleaf pine sandhills, pine rocklands, and other dry sandy sites.
