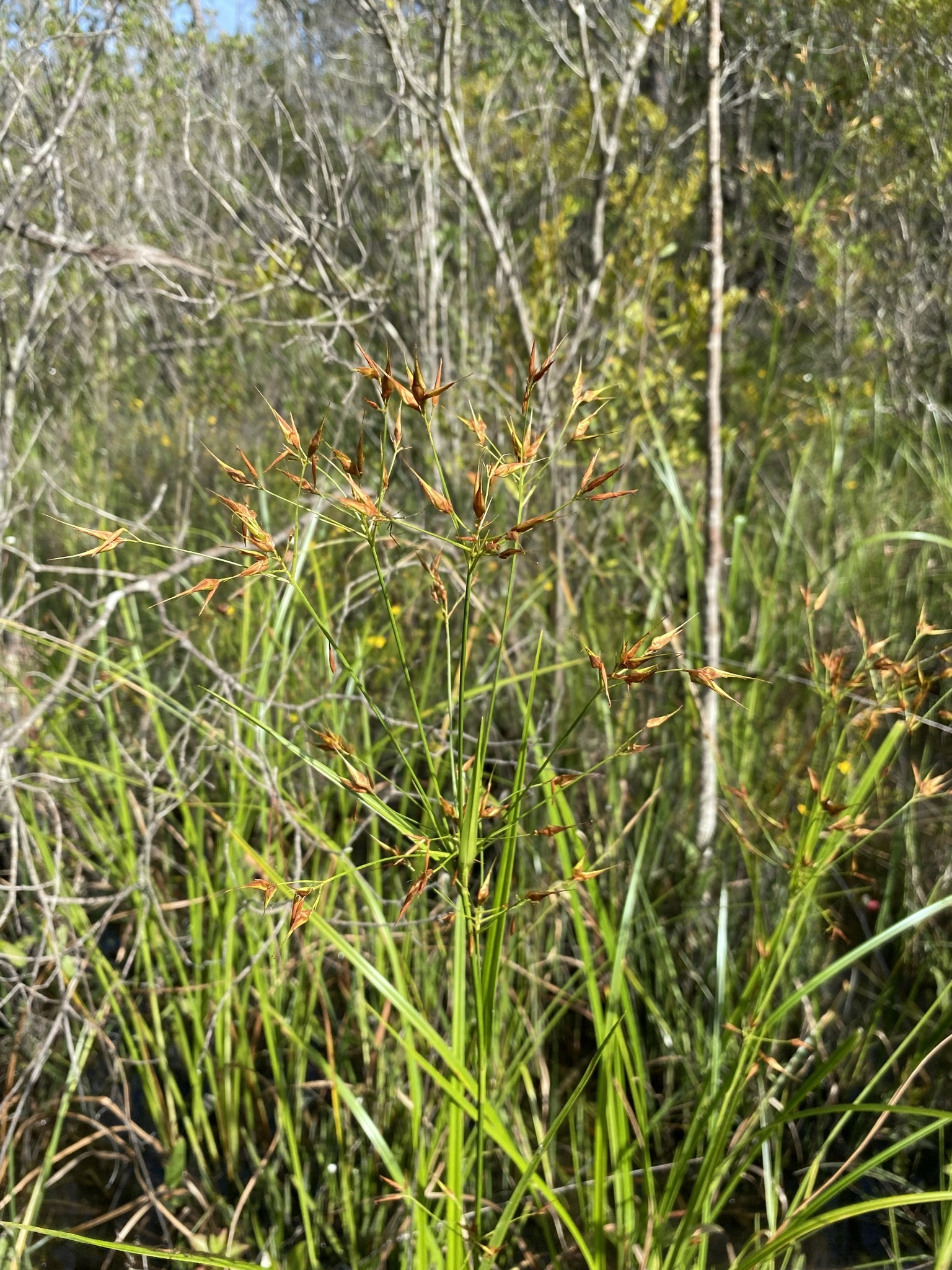

Scientific classification
- Kingdom: Plantae
- Clade: Tracheophytes
- Clade: Angiosperms
- Clade: Monocots
- Clade: Commelinids
- Order: Poales
- Family: Cyperaceae
- Genus: Rhynchospora
- Species: R. careyana

Binomial name
- Rhynchospora careyana Fernald (1918)

Synonyms
- Synonymy: Ceratoschoenus macrostachys var. patulus Chapm. (1860); Rhynchospora corniculata var. patula (Chapm.) Britton (1892); Rhynchospora macrostachya var. patula (Chapm.) Chapm. (1897)

= Rhynchospora careyana =

Broadfruit horned beaksedge

Species of plant

Rhynchospora careyana, known by the common name of broadfruit horned beaksedge, is a member of the sedge family, Cyperaceae. It is found in marshy areas near the Gulf coast of the southeastern United States, from western Louisiana to southeastern Georgia.
