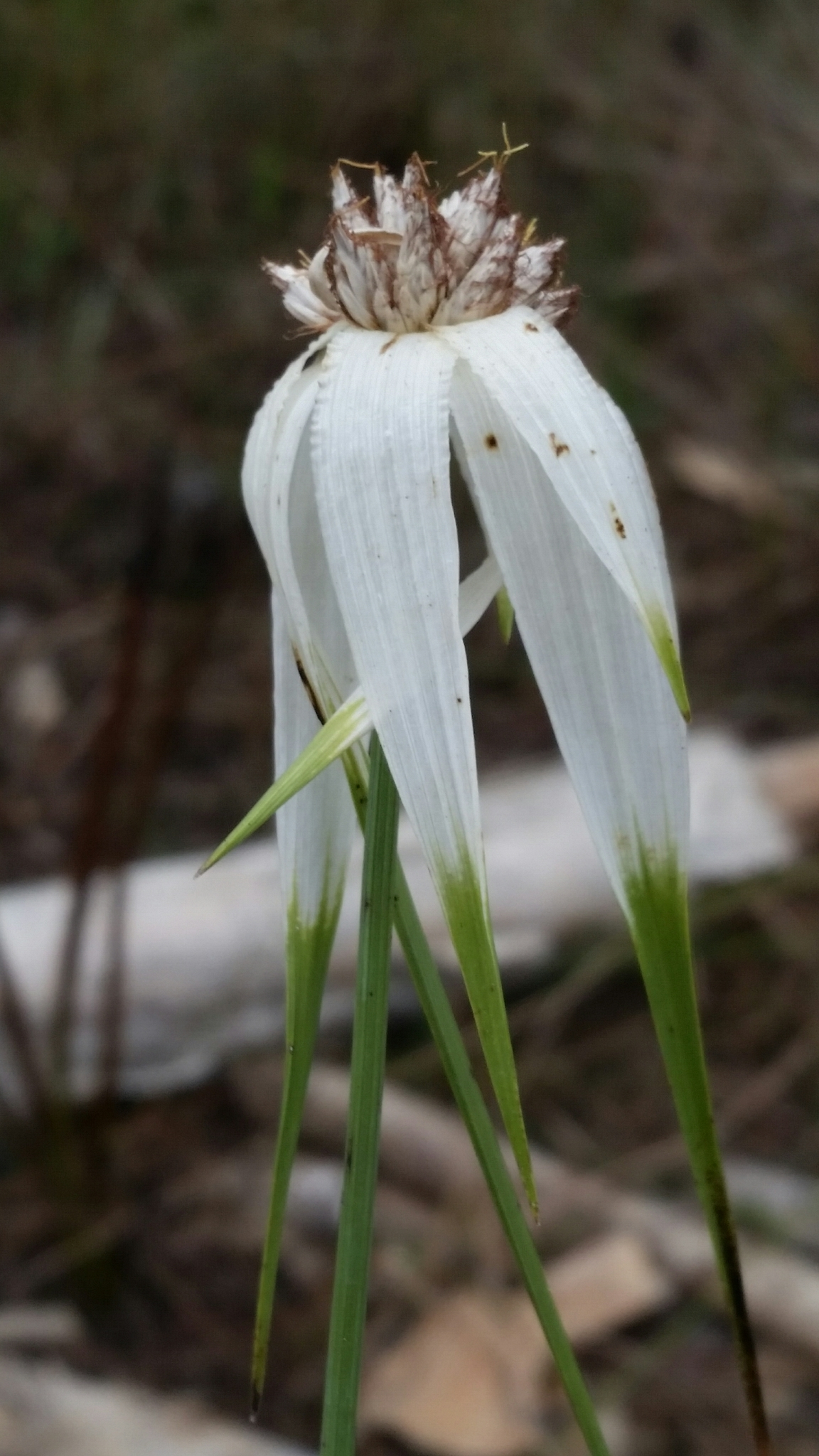

Scientific classification
- Kingdom: Plantae
- Clade: Tracheophytes
- Clade: Angiosperms
- Clade: Monocots
- Clade: Commelinids
- Order: Poales
- Family: Cyperaceae
- Genus: Rhynchospora
- Species: R. latifolia

Binomial name
- Rhynchospora latifolia (Baldw. ex Elliott) W.W.Thomas

= Rhynchospora latifolia =

Species of grass-like plant

Rhynchospora latifolia, known as sandswamp whitetop or tall whitetop sedge, is a species of flowering plant in the family Cyperaceae. Modified white leaves known as bracts grow atop this 1 to 3 foot tall, grass-like plant. It is found in much of the southeastern United States.

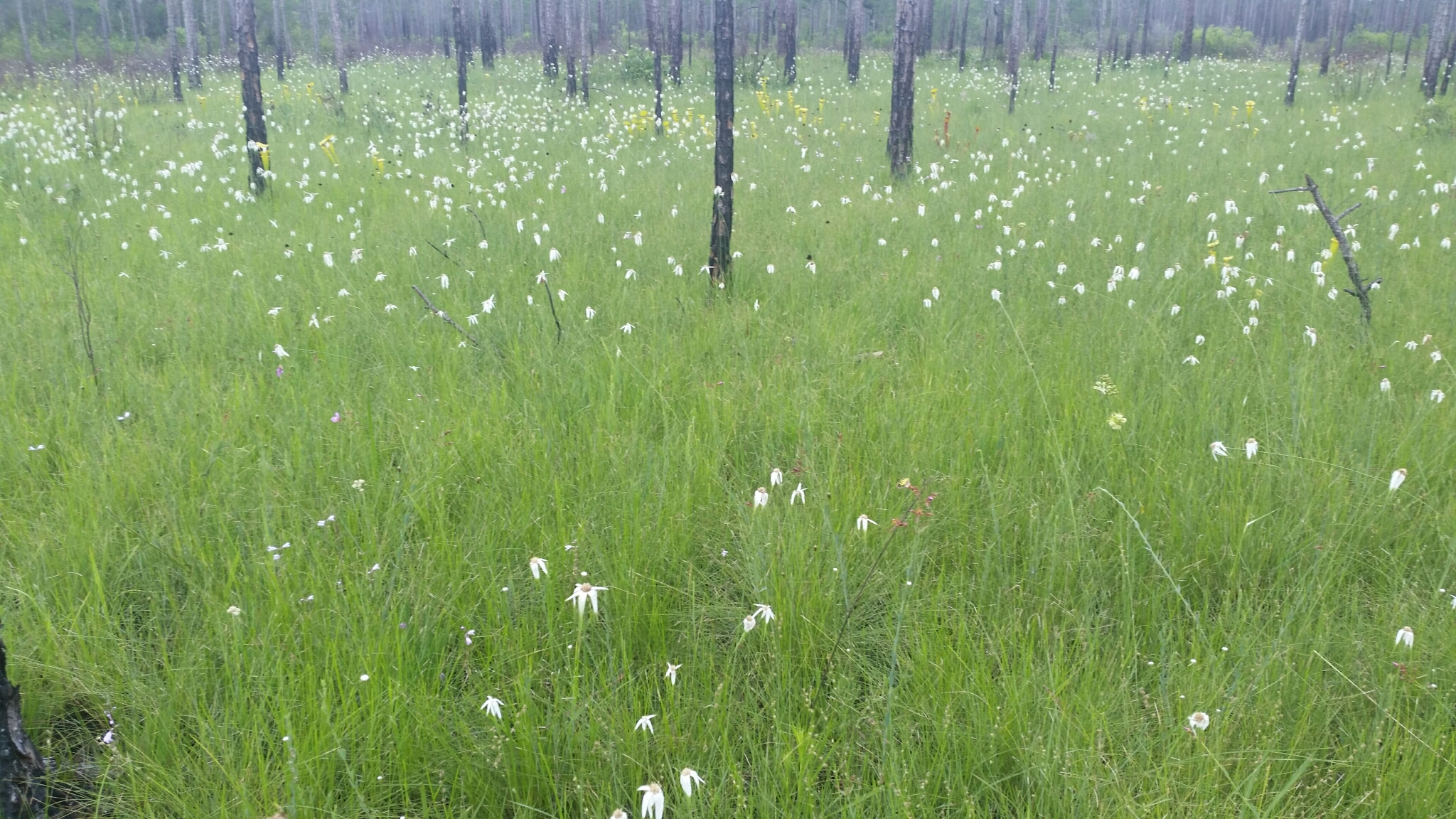
In Franklin County, Florida
