= Vernon Wildlife Area =

State Wildlife Area in Waukesha County, Wisconsin

- Vernon State Wildlife Area
- IUCN category V (protected landscape/seascape)
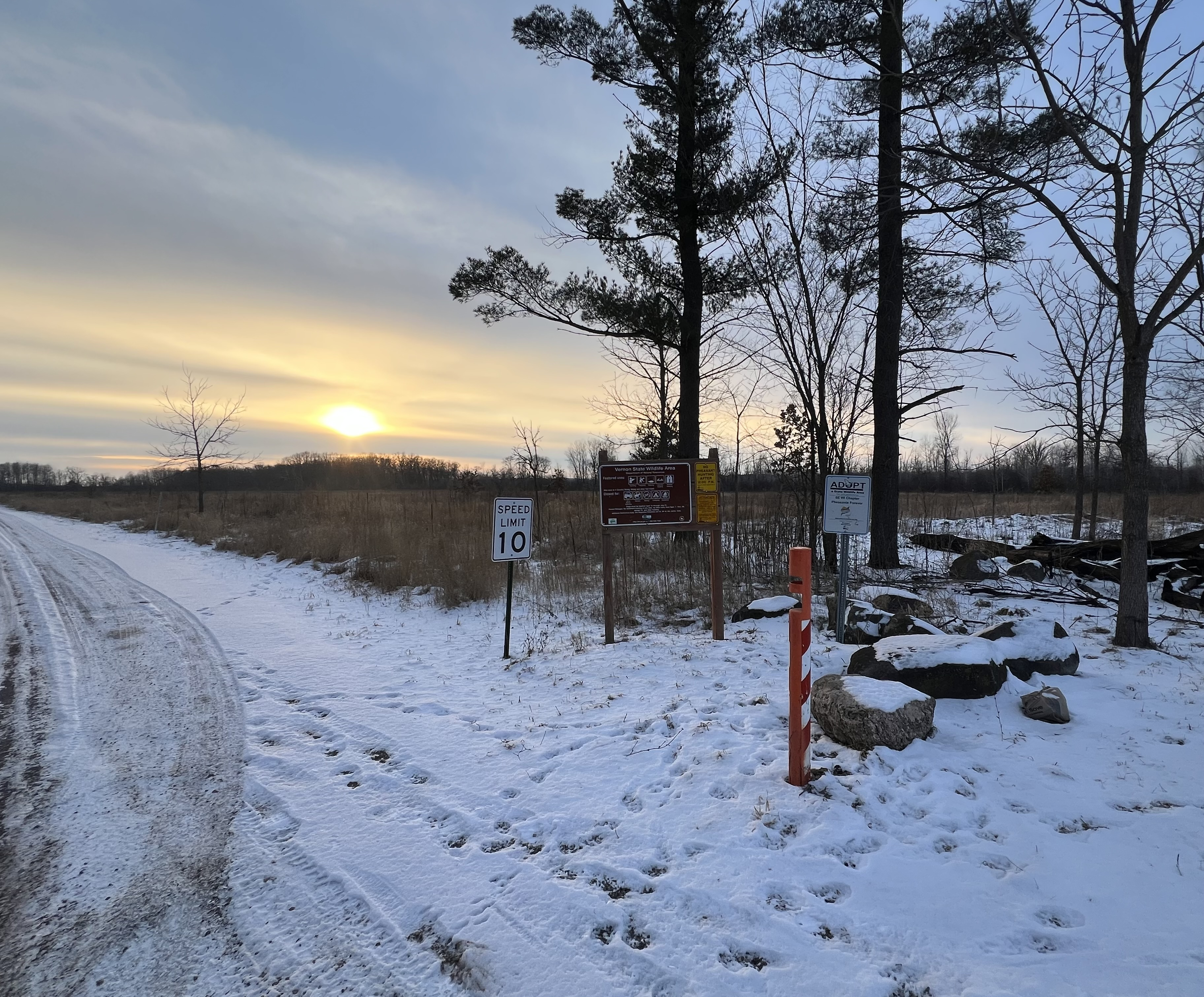

- Location within Wisconsin Location within the United States
- Location: Waukesha, Wisconsin
- Nearest city: Waukesha, Wisconsin
- Coordinates: 42°54′51″N 88°17′30″W
- Area: 5,967 acres (24.15 km^{2})
- Established: 1946
- Governing body: Wisconsin Department of Natural Resources

The Vernon Wildlife Area is a 5,967-acre (2,415 ha) tract of protected land located in Waukesha County, Wisconsin, managed by the Wisconsin Department of Natural Resources (WDNR). The first parcel of land to be used for the Wildlife Area was leased in 1946 to function as a public hunting ground, focusing primarily on small game and various game birds. The Vernon Wildlife Area is one of ten state protected areas included in the Southern Kettle Moraine Region Planning Group, a WDNR classified area.

== Flora ==
There are 14 prominent tree species in the wildlife area, including one species non-native to the region and Wisconsin in general (Norway maple). Native species include; shagbark hickory, black cherry, red maple, white ash, swamp ash, sugar maple, swamp birch, American basswood, eastern cottonwood, river birch, swamp white oak, silver maple, and American elm.

Besides species of trees, there are seven major types of brush that may be found in the wildlife area, including buckthorn, honeysuckle, dogwoods, canary grass, reed grass, garlic mustard, and narrowleaf cattail.

== Land cover ==
While the overall boundary of the area is measured at 5,967 acres (2,415 ha), only 4,330 acres (1,750 ha) are actually managed by the WDNR. An acquisition goal of 4,934 acres (1,997 ha) to be managed has been set by the WDNR.

Cover type acreage
Cover type	Acres	Percent cover
Agriculture	130	3%
Aspen	215	5%
Bottomland hardwood	75	2%
Conifer plantation	10	<1%
Developed	15	<1%
Grassland	150	4%
Lowland shrub	550	13%
Marsh/emergent wetland	2,310	53%
Non-forested wetlands	215	5%
Northern hardwoods	100	2%
Oak	185	4%
Oak savanna	50	1%
Prairie	10	<1%
Swamp conifers	20	<1%
Upland shrub	45	<1%
Water	250	6%
Total acreage	4,330	100%

== Vernon Fen ==
The Vernon Fen is a Calcareous Fen located within the boundaries of the greater Wildlife Area. The Fen has an area of 13 acres (5.3 ha) and is a Native Community objective. The Fen features peat soil and sloping hills, complete with multiple types of sedges. The Fen is home to multiple small springs that feed into the Fox River. The Fen is characterized by beak-rush and short-headed rush (Juncus brachycephalus).

== Recreation ==
The Vernon Wildlife Area was founded with the intent to create public hunting grounds in Waukesha, and as such the WDNR has made keeping game populations steady a focal point of their preservation efforts. Opportunities for hunting and trapping of mourning doves, deer, ring-necked pheasant, and turkey are available.

Fishing is also a popular activity according to the WDNR, with the Mill Brook (a passively managed Class 2 trout stream classed as an Exceptional Resource Water by the WDNR) being a key access point for trout fishing.
