= R. californica =

R. californica may refer to:

- Rafinesquia californica, the California chicory or California plumeseed, a flowering plant species native to most of the southwestern United States as far north as Oregon and to Baja California in Mexico
- Rhamnus californica, the California buckthorn or coffeeberry, a plant species native to California and southwestern Oregon
- Rhynchospora californica, the California beaked-rush or California beaksedge, a plant species endemic to California
- Rosa californica, the California wild rose, a plant species native to California and Oregon

== See also ==
- List of Latin and Greek words commonly used in systematic names § C
