= Star grass =

Star grass is a common name for several plants and may refer to:

== Grasses ==
- Cynodon, a genus of nine species of grasses
- Cynodon dactylon, a species of grass in the genus Cynodon
- Heteranthera dubia

== Others ==
- Aletris, a genus of flowering plants in the Nartheciaceae
- Callitriche a genus of flowering plants in the family Nartheciaceae
- Chloris, a genus of flowering plants in the family Nartheciaceae
- Halophila engelmannii, a seagrass
- Hypoxis, a genus of flowering plants of the family Hypoxidaceae
- Rhynchospora colorata, a sedge
