= Rhynchospora pineticola =

Scientific classification
- Kingdom: Plantae
- Clade: Tracheophytes
- Clade: Angiosperms
- Clade: Monocots
- Clade: Commelinids
- Order: Poales
- Family: Cyperaceae
- Genus: Rhynchospora
- Species: R. pineticola

Binomial name
- Rhynchospora pineticola C.B. Clarke

Species of plant

Rhynchospora pineticola, commonly known as pinebarren beaksedge, is a perennial graminoid in the sedge family.

== Description ==
Rhynchospora pineticola is a densely tufted sedge that grows 20–70 cm tall, with a deep reddish-brown base and no rhizomes. Culms are upright to slightly angled and stiff, with leaves mostly shorter than the scape. Leaf blades are narrow (1–3 mm wide), with rolled margins and tapering, three-angled tips. The inflorescence typically consists of 1 or 2 dense clusters, which are broadly cone-shaped to rounded or lobed. A stiff, narrow bract rises above the flower clusters. Spikelets are reddish-brown, lance-shaped, and 3.5–6 mm long, with pointed tips. Fertile scales are ovate, convex, and 3–3.5 mm long. Each flower has six bristles that are plumose (feathery) for over half their length and reach at least to the base of the tubercle. Each spikelet usually produces a single fruit, which is dark reddish-brown, rounded, and 2–2.8 mm long. The fruit surface is finely and irregularly wrinkled. The tubercle on top is broadly cone-shaped, often with a small point at the tip and a distinctly two-lobed base.

== Distribution and habitat ==
Rhynchospora pineticola is distributed from northeastern Florida to eastern panhandle Florida south to South Florida. It is also found in Cuba. It grows in sandhills, dry sandy pinelands, and scrub.
