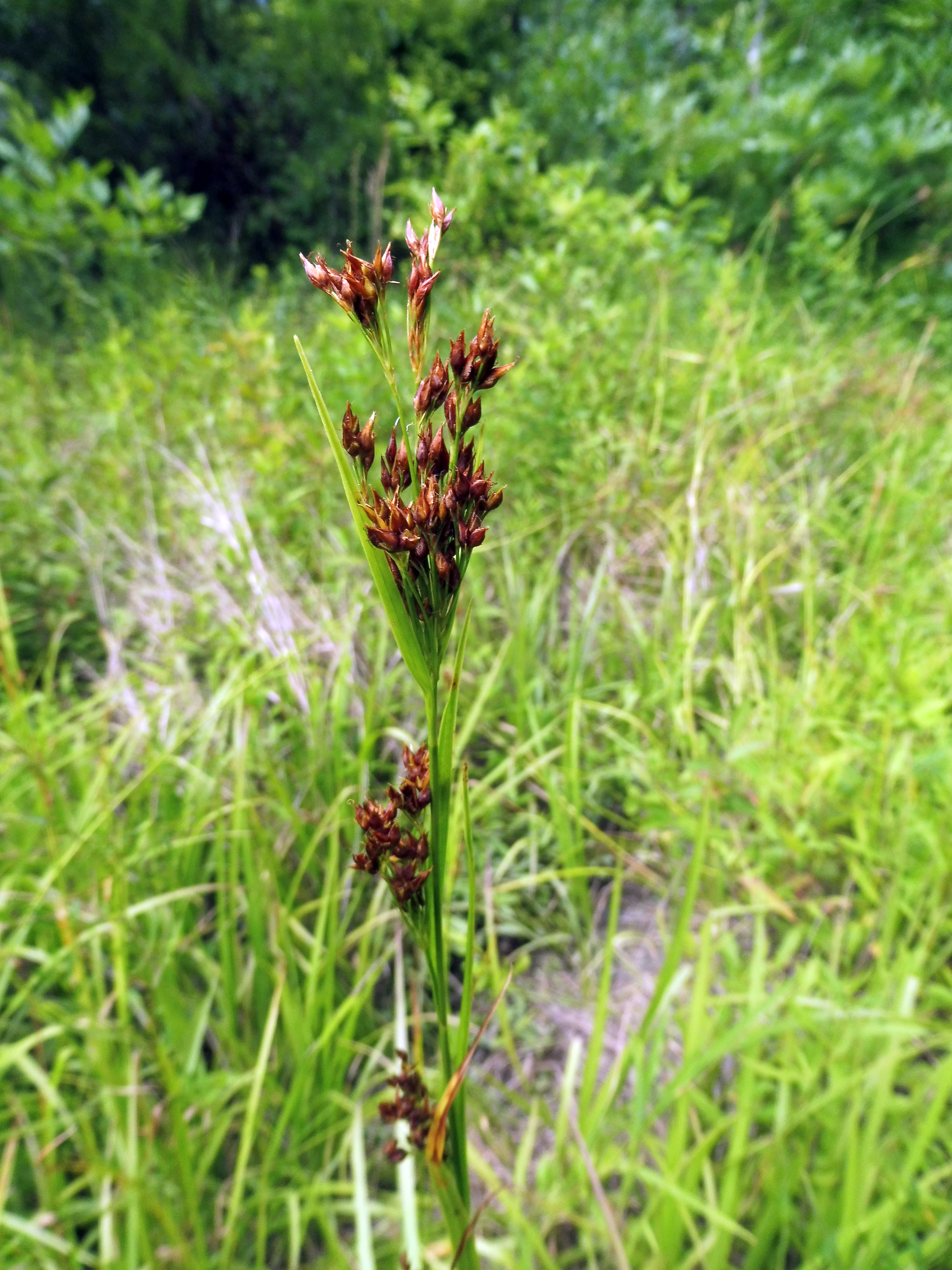

Scientific classification
- Kingdom: Plantae
- Clade: Tracheophytes
- Clade: Angiosperms
- Clade: Monocots
- Clade: Commelinids
- Order: Poales
- Family: Cyperaceae
- Genus: Rhynchospora
- Species: R. caduca

Binomial name
- Rhynchospora caduca Elliott

= Rhynchospora caduca =

Species of grass-like plant

Rhynchospora caduca, commonly called anglestem beaksedge, is a species of flowering plant in the sedge family (Cyperaceae). It is native to North America, where it is found in the southeastern United States. Its typical natural habitat is in low, wet areas, such as in marshes, seeps, tidal swamps, pine savannas, and flatwoods.

Rhynchospora caduca is a cespitose perennial, usually with short scaly rhizomes. It is tall for a Rhynchospora, growing up to 150 cm high. It produces fruits in summer through fall. It is closely related to Rhynchospora mixta and Rhynchospora odorata, and local introgressant populations have been noted.
