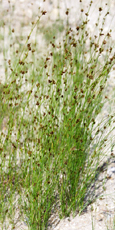

Conservation status
- Imperiled (NatureServe)

Scientific classification
- Kingdom: Plantae
- Clade: Tracheophytes
- Clade: Angiosperms
- Clade: Monocots
- Clade: Commelinids
- Order: Poales
- Family: Cyperaceae
- Genus: Rhynchospora
- Species: R. knieskernii

Binomial name
- Rhynchospora knieskernii Carey

= Rhynchospora knieskernii =

Species of grass-like plant

Rhynchospora knieskernii is a rare species of sedge known by the common name Knieskern's beaksedge. It is endemic to the state of New Jersey in the United States, where it occurs naturally in the Pine Barrens. Reports have cited it present in Delaware as well, but these populations appear to have been introduced. It is threatened by the destruction and degradation of its habitat. It is a federally listed threatened species of the United States.

This perennial sedge produces clumps of very narrow, triangular stems lined with thin leaves. Inflorescences occur at the tips and on the sides of the stems. Each contains two to four tight clusters of dark brown spikelets and leaflike bracts. The seeds require cold and wet stratification, as well as light, in order to germinate.

The plant is limited to the Pine Barrens of southern New Jersey. It has been collected within the state of Delaware, but it has not been seen there in over a century and it is considered extirpated. It is a plant of wetlands. It grows in wet, disturbed habitat, such as recently burned areas. Its habitat has fluctuating groundwater levels; it is tolerant of drought but also prefers very wet substrates. It appears in early successional stages of disturbed habitat, taking hold before most other plants move in; it does not compete well with other plants. It grows in habitat that has relatively few other plants due to disturbance, chemistry, a variable water supply, and other factors. Substrates are low in nutrients and high in minerals. It is known from streams rich in bog iron deposits, where a slow current causes gradual erosion and the soil chemistry is not hospitable to many other species. The habitat is often dominated by pitch pine (Pinus rigida) in the Pine Barrens. Other plants in the area include poverty grass (Aristida longispica), warty panic-grass (Panicum verrucosum), and spatulate-leaved sundew (Drosera intermedia).

This sedge is intolerant of shade and it does not grow in areas where large and woody vegetation would shade it out. It naturally grows in pine forest that is maintained by a natural fire regime featuring periodic wildfire. Fires prevent the buildup of vegetation and allow sun to reach smaller plants, such as the sedge. The seeds probably cannot germinate if there is a large buildup of organic matter on the soil surface, such as leaf litter. Today there are few areas where such a natural fire regime can still occur because of the widespread practice of fire suppression. This has reduced the sedge's population and it now grows in areas that are artificially disturbed. These habitat types may include gravel, clay, and sand mines, pits, and ditches, railroads, clearings, and unpaved roads.

Threats to this species mostly involve the loss of its wet, disturbed habitat. In areas where fire is suppressed, the overgrowth of vegetation shades out the sedge and populations disappear. In artificially cleared habitat it faces threats from human activity, such as mining, off-road vehicle use, road maintenance, and development. Trash dumping occurs at some sites.

In 2007 there were 45 occurrences of the plant, but few of these have been surveyed recently enough to confirm the presence of the plant.
