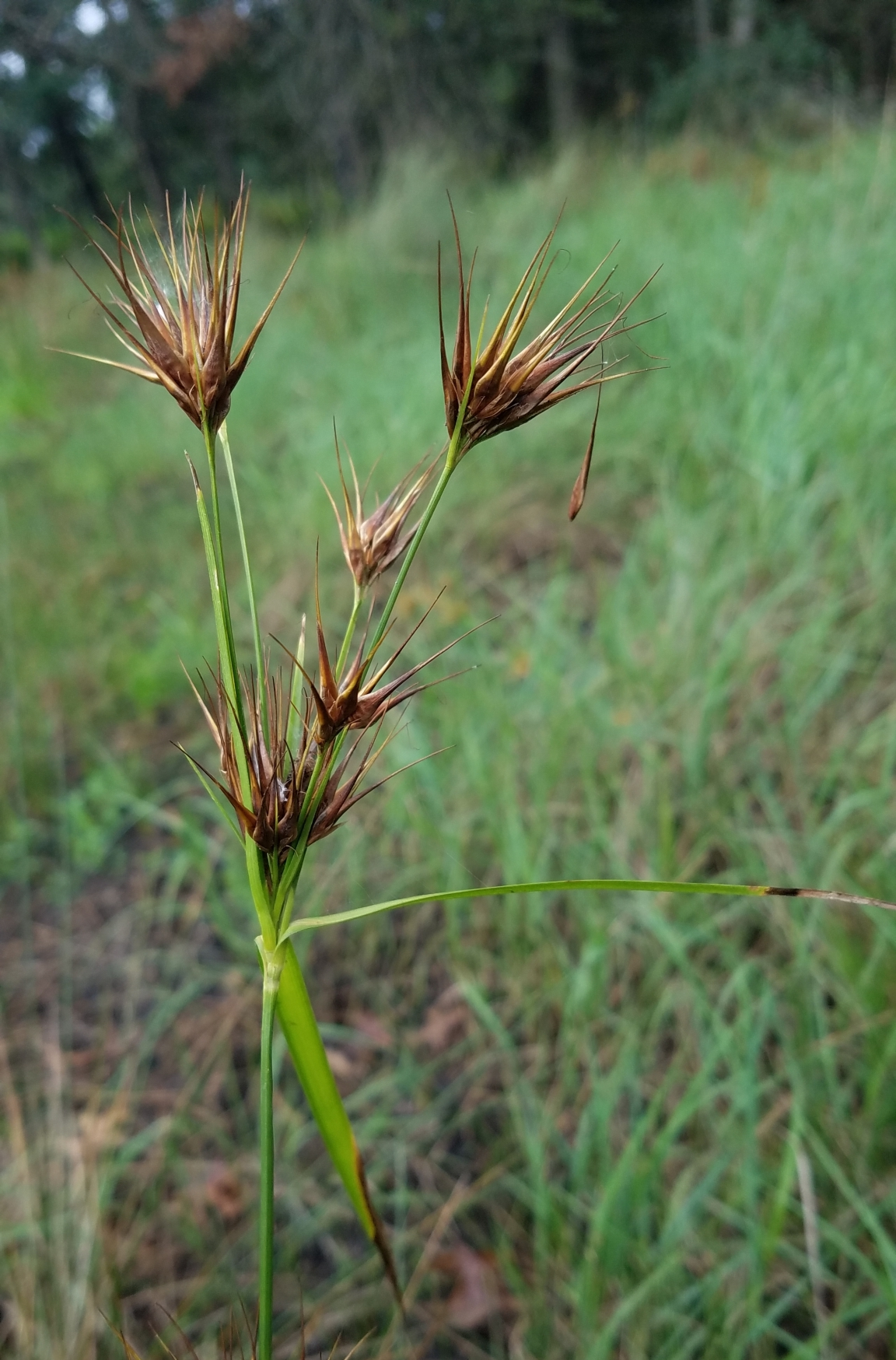

Scientific classification
- Kingdom: Plantae
- Clade: Tracheophytes
- Clade: Angiosperms
- Clade: Monocots
- Clade: Commelinids
- Order: Poales
- Family: Cyperaceae
- Genus: Rhynchospora
- Species: R. macrostachya

Binomial name
- Rhynchospora macrostachya Torr. ex A.Gray

= Rhynchospora macrostachya =

Species of grass-like plant

Rhynchospora macrostachya, the tall horned beaksedge or tall beaksedge, is a plant in the sedge family, Cyperaceae. It is a perennial.

== Conservation status in the United States ==
It is listed as threatened in Connecticut and Rhode Island. It is listed as rare in Indiana, and as endangered in Kentucky and Maine.
