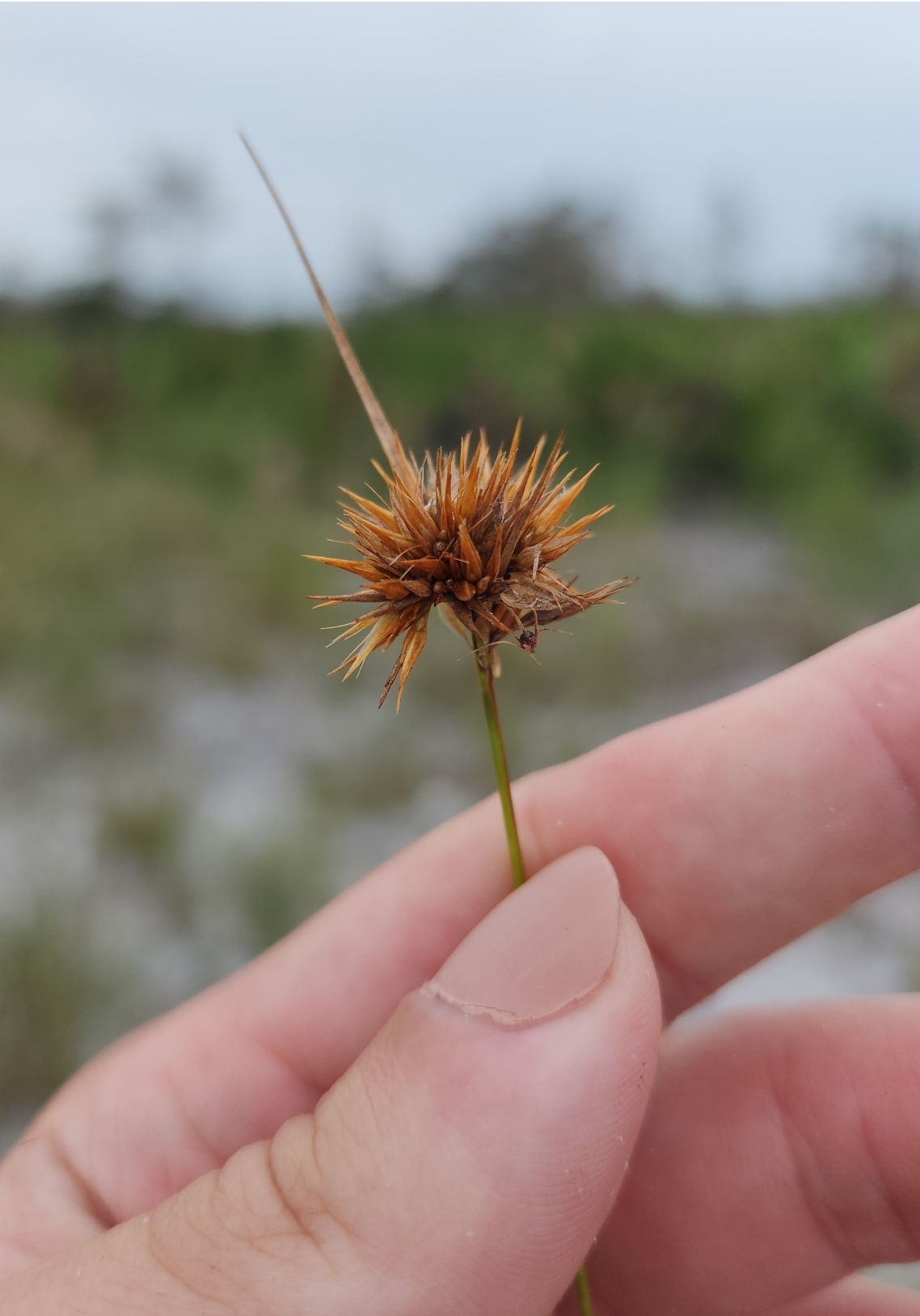

Conservation status
- Imperiled (NatureServe)

Scientific classification
- Kingdom: Plantae
- Clade: Tracheophytes
- Clade: Angiosperms
- Clade: Monocots
- Clade: Commelinids
- Order: Poales
- Family: Cyperaceae
- Genus: Rhynchospora
- Species: R. megaplumosa

Binomial name
- Rhynchospora megaplumosa E.L.Bridges & S.L.Orzell

= Rhynchospora megaplumosa =

Manatee beaksedge

Species of grass-like plant

Rhynchospora megaplumosa, the Manatee beaksedge, is a plant species endemic to a small region in central Florida. It is known from only 4 Counties: Polk, Hillsboro, Manatee and Sarasota. It generally grows on sandy soil in pine woodlands.

Rhynchospora megaplumosa is a perennial herb up to 90 cm tall, often forming clumps. Culms are round in cross-section. Spikelets are densely crowded together, tapering at both ends, light brown, about 9 mm long, with bristles nearly twice as long as the fruit, sticking out of the spikelet and giving a feathery appearance.
