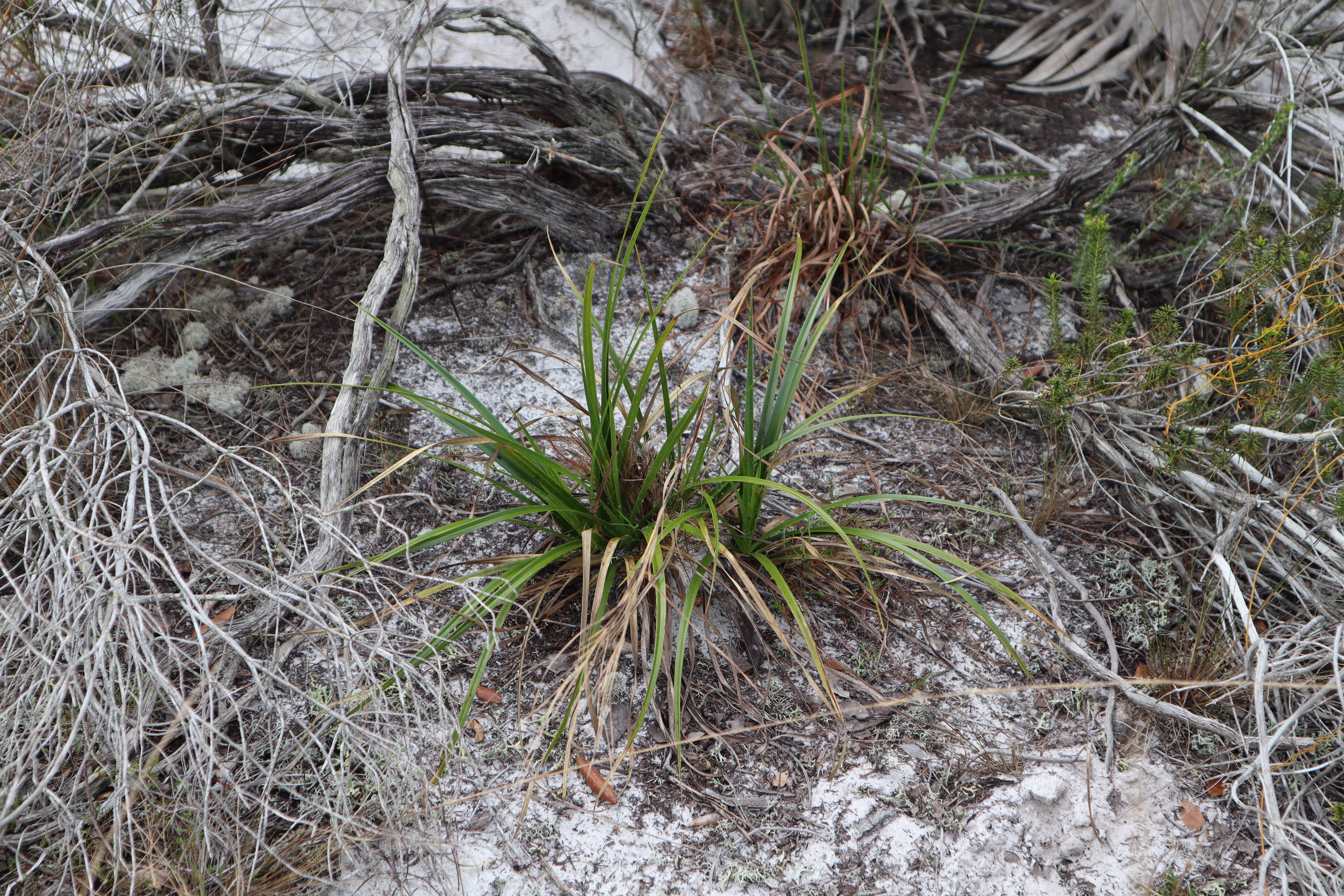

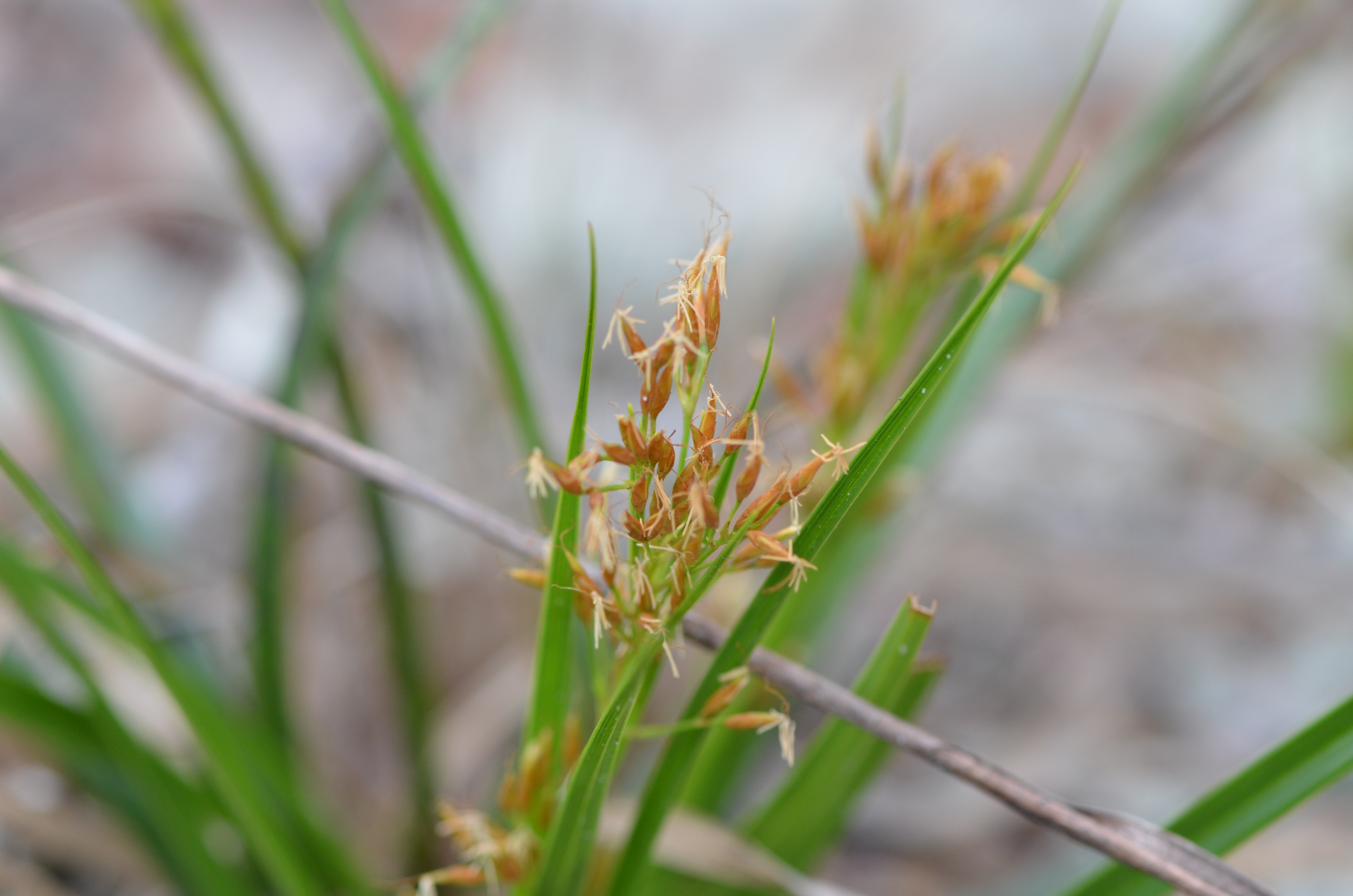
- R. megalocarpa inflorescence

Conservation status
- Secure (NatureServe)

Scientific classification
- Kingdom: Plantae
- Clade: Tracheophytes
- Clade: Angiosperms
- Clade: Monocots
- Clade: Commelinids
- Order: Poales
- Family: Cyperaceae
- Genus: Rhynchospora
- Species: R. megalocarpa

Binomial name
- Rhynchospora megalocarpa A. Gray

Synonyms
- Phaeocephalum dodecandrum; Rhynchospora dodecandra; Rhynchospora pycnocarpa

= Rhynchospora megalocarpa =

Species of grass-like plant

Rhynchospora megalocarpa, commonly called sandyfield beaksedge, is a species of flowering plant in the sedge family (Cyperaceae). It is native to North America, where it is found in the southeastern United States.

== Distribution ==
Rhynchospora megalocarpa is found in the southeastern part of the United States in Florida, Georgia, Alabama, Mississippi, North Carolina, and South Carolina. It is prominently located in Florida. It enjoys a white or yellow sand-hill environment to grow in. It has also been found in scrub, scrubby flatwoods, and xeric hammock environments.

== Description ==
Rhynchospora megalocarpa is a perennial plant. It has been known to grow 130 cm in diameter. It has a scaly rhizome that form stolons. The culm is typically erect to arching. Like most sedges, R. megalocarpa forms leaves spirally arranged in three ranks. The leaves are linear, around 3–7 mm wide. The inflorescence forms 2-6 spikelet clusters, that are light red-brown color. The fruits are achenes; each spikelet contains 1-2 fruits. The achene is typically 4–5 mm wide. It has a dark brown to black coloration. It fruits from summer through fall.
