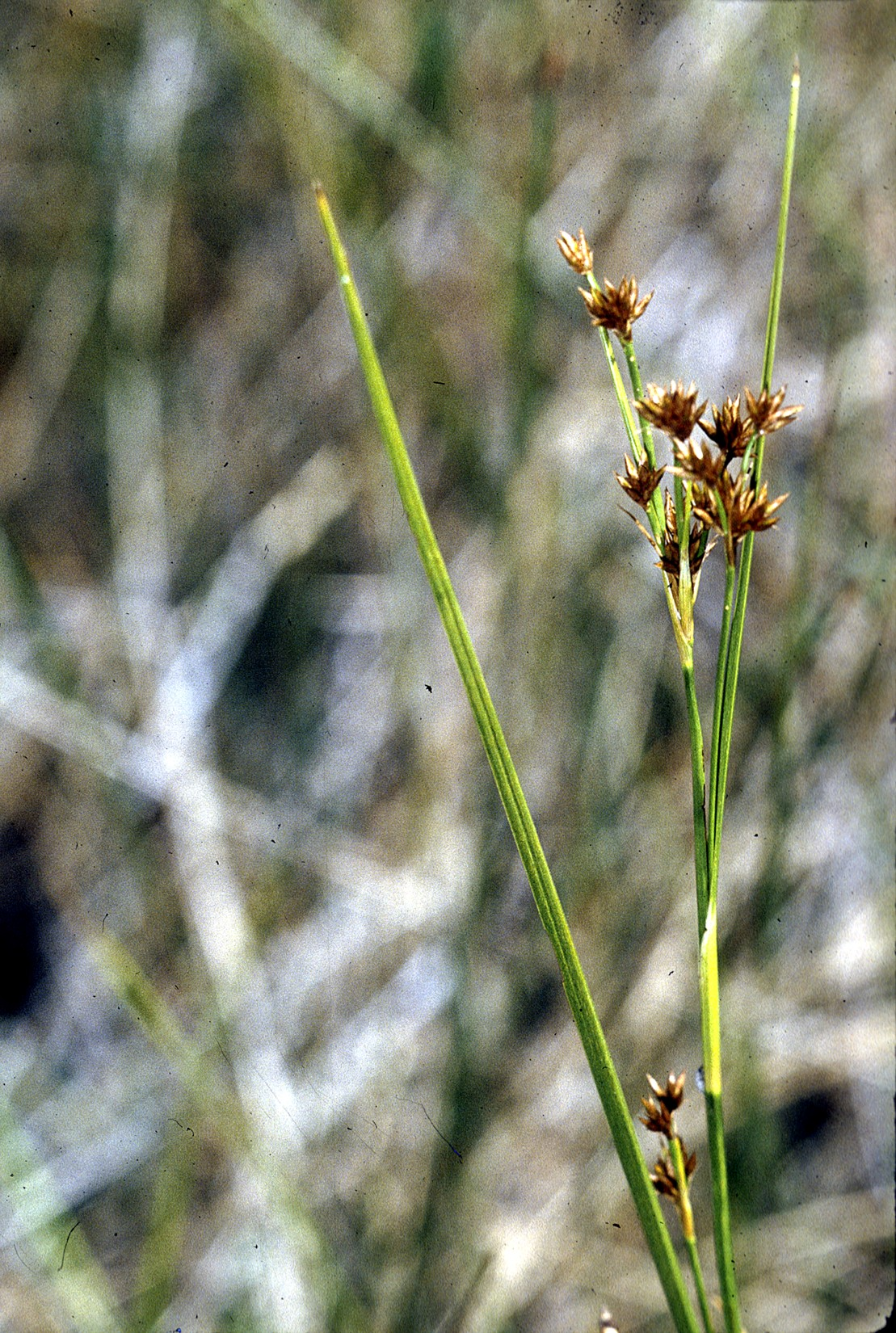

Scientific classification
- Kingdom: Plantae
- Clade: Tracheophytes
- Clade: Angiosperms
- Clade: Monocots
- Clade: Commelinids
- Order: Poales
- Family: Cyperaceae
- Genus: Rhynchospora
- Species: R. capitellata

Binomial name
- Rhynchospora capitellata (Michx.) Vahl

= Rhynchospora capitellata =

Species of grass-like plant

Rhynchospora capitellata is a species of sedge known by the common names brownish beaksedge and brownish beaked-rush. It is native to eastern North America and a few spots in the western United States. It grows in wet habitat, such as swamps, springtime meadows, and moist areas in forests. It is a perennial herb producing clumps of stems 20 to 100 centimeters tall, each stem sheathed with several narrow, pointed leaves. The inflorescence is a cluster of brown spikelets each about 3 or 4 millimeters long.
