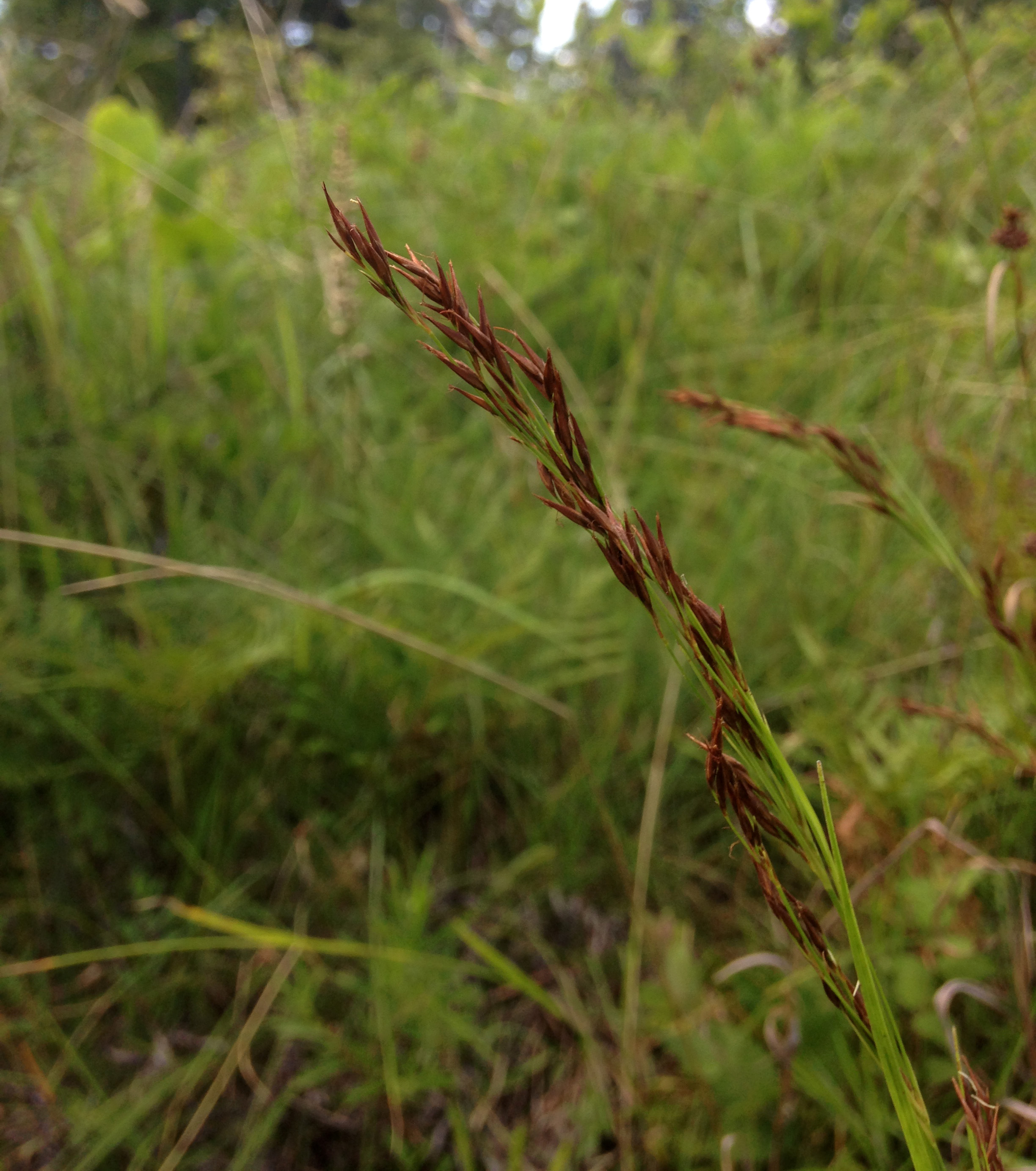

Scientific classification
- Kingdom: Plantae
- Clade: Tracheophytes
- Clade: Angiosperms
- Clade: Monocots
- Clade: Commelinids
- Order: Poales
- Family: Cyperaceae
- Genus: Rhynchospora
- Species: R. inexpansa

Binomial name
- Rhynchospora inexpansa (Michx.) Vahl.

= Rhynchospora inexpansa =

Species of grass-like plant

Rhynchospora inexpansa, commonly called nodding beaksedge, is a species of flowering plant in the sedge family (Cyperaceae). It is native to North America, where it is found in the southeastern United States and West Indies. Its typical natural habitat is in moist meadows, flatwoods, and pond edges. It is a weedy species that responds positively to ecological disturbance.

== Description ==
Rhynchospora inexpansa is a tufted perennial, with flexuous stems that droop at the tip. The cespitose plant reaches 30–120 cm (12–47 in) in height. The arching and drooping culms are slender and ribbed. The leaves exceed the culms. The ascending or spreading leaf blades are 2–3.5 mm (0.079–0.138 in) with a trigonous and tapering apex. The inflorescences consist of clusters of three to six spikelets progressively spaced further away from each other. The spikelets are narrow and elongated, and the leafy bracts are slender and exceed the clusters. The reddish brown, lanceoloid spikelets are 5–7 mm (0.20–0.28 in) long with acuminate apices. The flowers have six perianth bristles that exceed the tubercle and are antrorsely barbellate. The two to three brown fruits in each spikelet are 3–3.2 mm (0.12–0.13 in) long with a wavy rugose surface.

It fruits from June to October.
