= Rhynchospora longisetis =

Scientific classification
- Kingdom: Plantae
- Clade: Tracheophytes
- Clade: Angiosperms
- Clade: Monocots
- Clade: Commelinids
- Order: Poales
- Family: Cyperaceae
- Genus: Rhynchospora
- Species: R. longisetis

Binomial name
- Rhynchospora longisetis R.Br.

Species of grass-like plant

Rhynchospora longisetis is a species of plant in the family Cyperaceae first described by Robert Brown. No subspecies listed in the Catalogue of Life.
