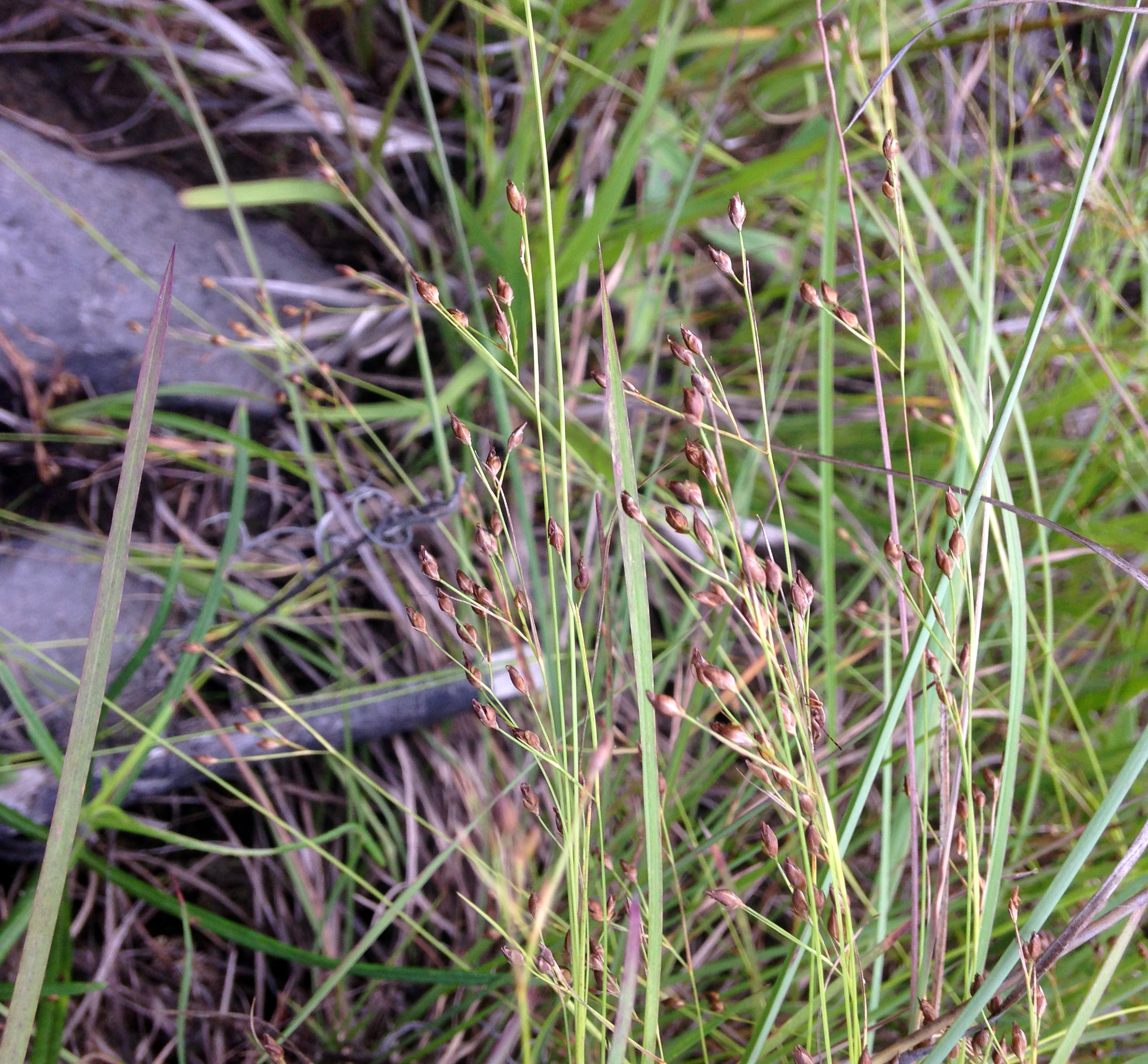

Scientific classification
- Kingdom: Plantae
- Clade: Tracheophytes
- Clade: Angiosperms
- Clade: Monocots
- Clade: Commelinids
- Order: Poales
- Family: Cyperaceae
- Genus: Rhynchospora
- Species: R. rariflora

Binomial name
- Rhynchospora rariflora (Michx.) Elliott

= Rhynchospora rariflora =

Species of grass-like plant

Rhynchospora rariflora, commonly called fewflower beaksedge, is a species of flowering plant in the sedge family (Cyperaceae). It is native to North America, where it is found in the southeastern United States, Mexico, Belize, Honduras, Nicaragua, and the West Indies. Its typical natural habitat is sandy or peaty areas, in wet savannas, seeps, and bogs.

Rhynchospora rariflora is a densely tufted perennial with delicate, lax stems. Its leaves are nearly thread-like. Its inflorescence is loose and sparsely flowered. In the northern area of its range it fruits from late spring to summer, while in the southern area it is reproductive year-round.

It is similar to Rhynchospora stenophylla, from which Rhynchospora rariflora can be distinguished by having bristles that are shorter than the achene body, and by its smaller tubercle.
