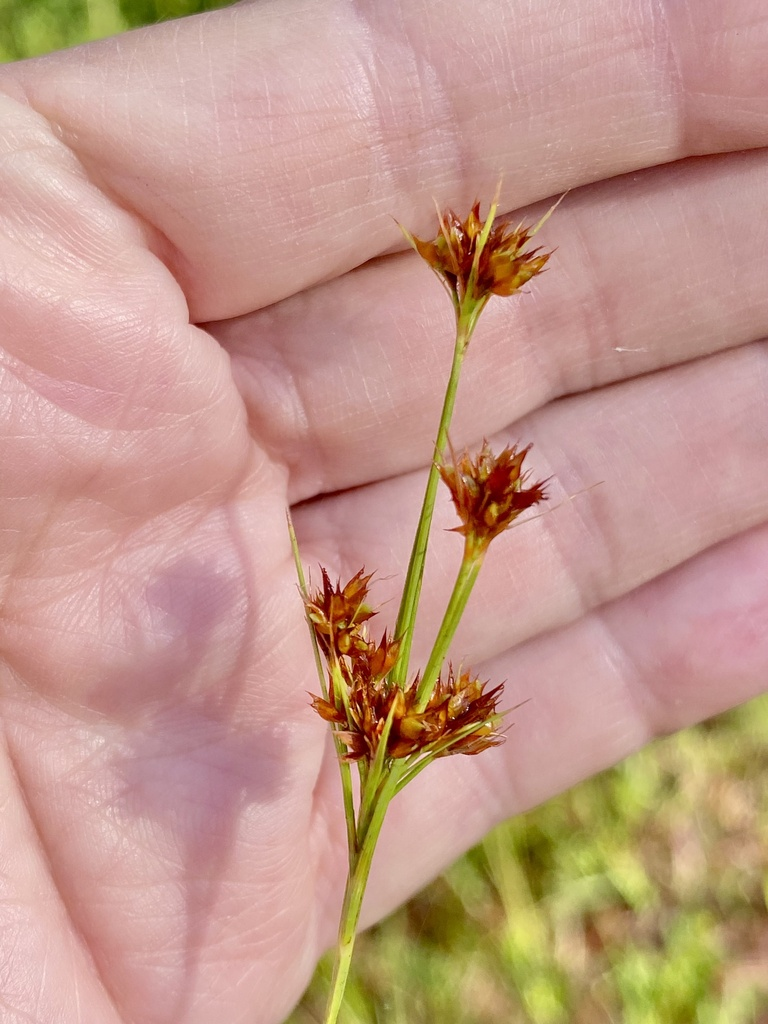

Scientific classification
- Kingdom: Plantae
- Clade: Embryophytes
- Clade: Tracheophytes
- Clade: Spermatophytes
- Clade: Angiosperms
- Clade: Monocots
- Clade: Commelinids
- Order: Poales
- Family: Cyperaceae
- Genus: Rhynchospora
- Species: R. fascicularis

Binomial name
- Rhynchospora fascicularis (Michx.) Vahl

= Rhynchospora fascicularis =

Species of plant

Rhynchospora fascicularis, commonly known as the fascicled beaksedge, is a perennial grass within the family Cyperaceae.

== Description ==
Rhynchospora fascicularis is a perennial graminoid, which forms tussocks that reach around 1 to 1.5 metres tall. The leaves are narrow and around 1 to 4mm wide. When it blooms the flowers form in a spikelet clusters of around 1 to 4 flowers. The spikelets are range between 3.5 and 5 mm in size and are reddish brown in color. Flowers have 5 or 6 bristles that possess barbs that point forward. This species also lacks rhizomes.

== Distribution ==
Rhynchospora fascicularis is distributed in areas that possess subtropical and tropical climates, which exhibit mild winters and hot summers, where frost is consequently rare. In the Southeastern United States, R. fascicularis can be found growing in Virginia, extending south into Florida and west to Texas, and is also present in Alabama, Georgia, Louisiana, Mississippi, North Carolina, and South Carolina. In Mexico, the species occurs in both the Gulf and southeastern regions. Its range further extends through Central America, including Belize, Guatemala, Honduras, and Nicaragua and further into northern South America, where it is present in Guyana, Suriname and Venezuela. The species can also be found in the Caribbean, with records from Bermuda, Cuba, the Dominican Republic, Jamaica, and Puerto Rico.

== Habitat ==
Rhynchospora fascicularis can be found growing within sandy and peaty soils. The species commonly inhabits pine savana habitat, but also coastal plains.
