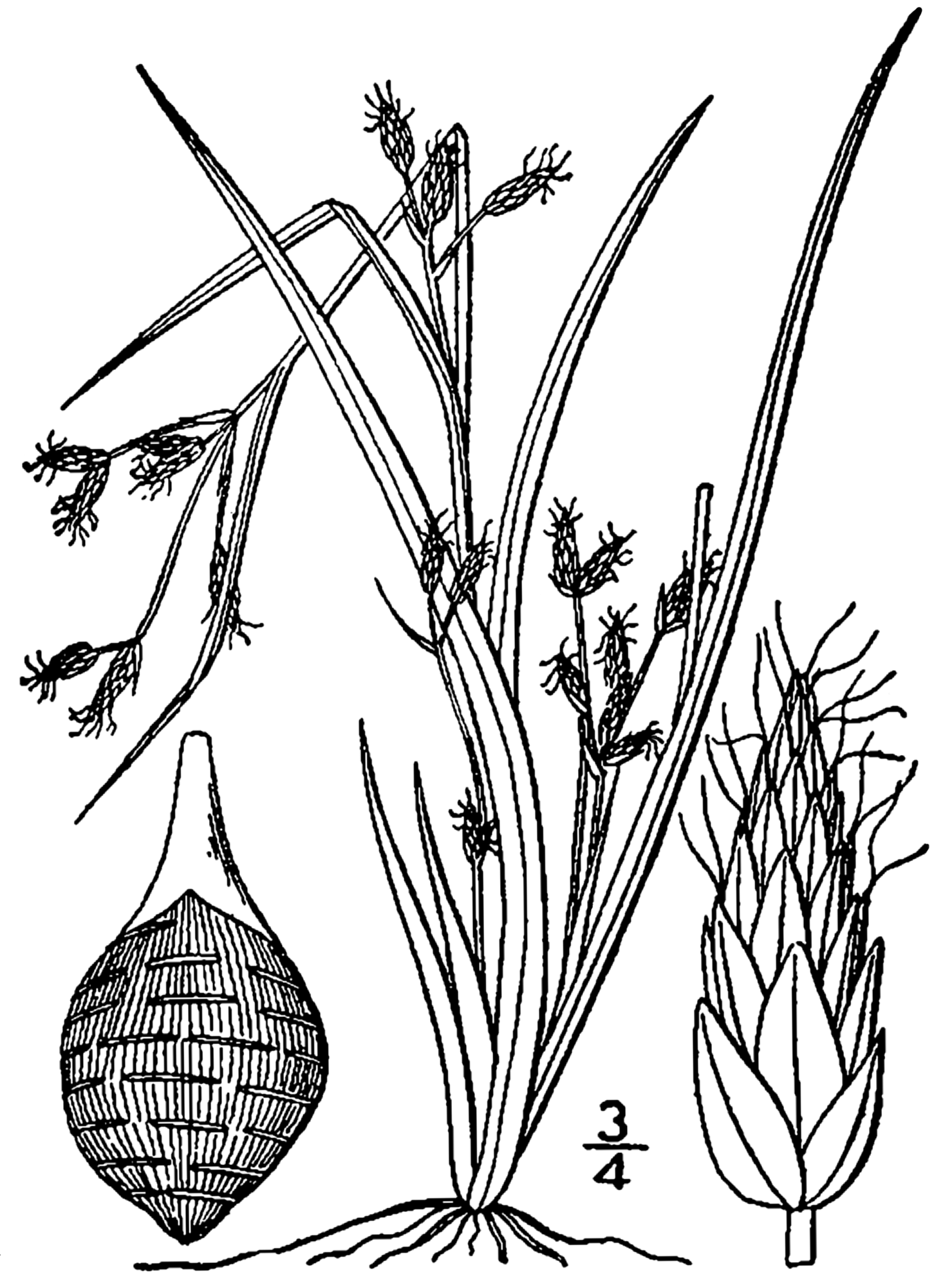

Scientific classification
- Kingdom: Plantae
- Clade: Tracheophytes
- Clade: Angiosperms
- Clade: Monocots
- Clade: Commelinids
- Order: Poales
- Family: Cyperaceae
- Genus: Rhynchospora
- Species: R. scirpoides

Binomial name
- Rhynchospora scirpoides (Torr.) A.Gray

Synonyms
- Psilocarya scirpoides

= Rhynchospora scirpoides =

Species of grass-like plant

Rhynchospora scirpoides, also referred to as Psilocarya scirpoides; common names long-beaked beaksedge and long-beaked bald rush; is a plant in the Rhynchospora genus found in North America.

== Conservation status ==
It is listed as endangered in Connecticut and Rhode Island. It is listed as threatened Indiana, Maryland and Michigan. It is listed as special concern in Massachusetts and as rare in New York (state).
