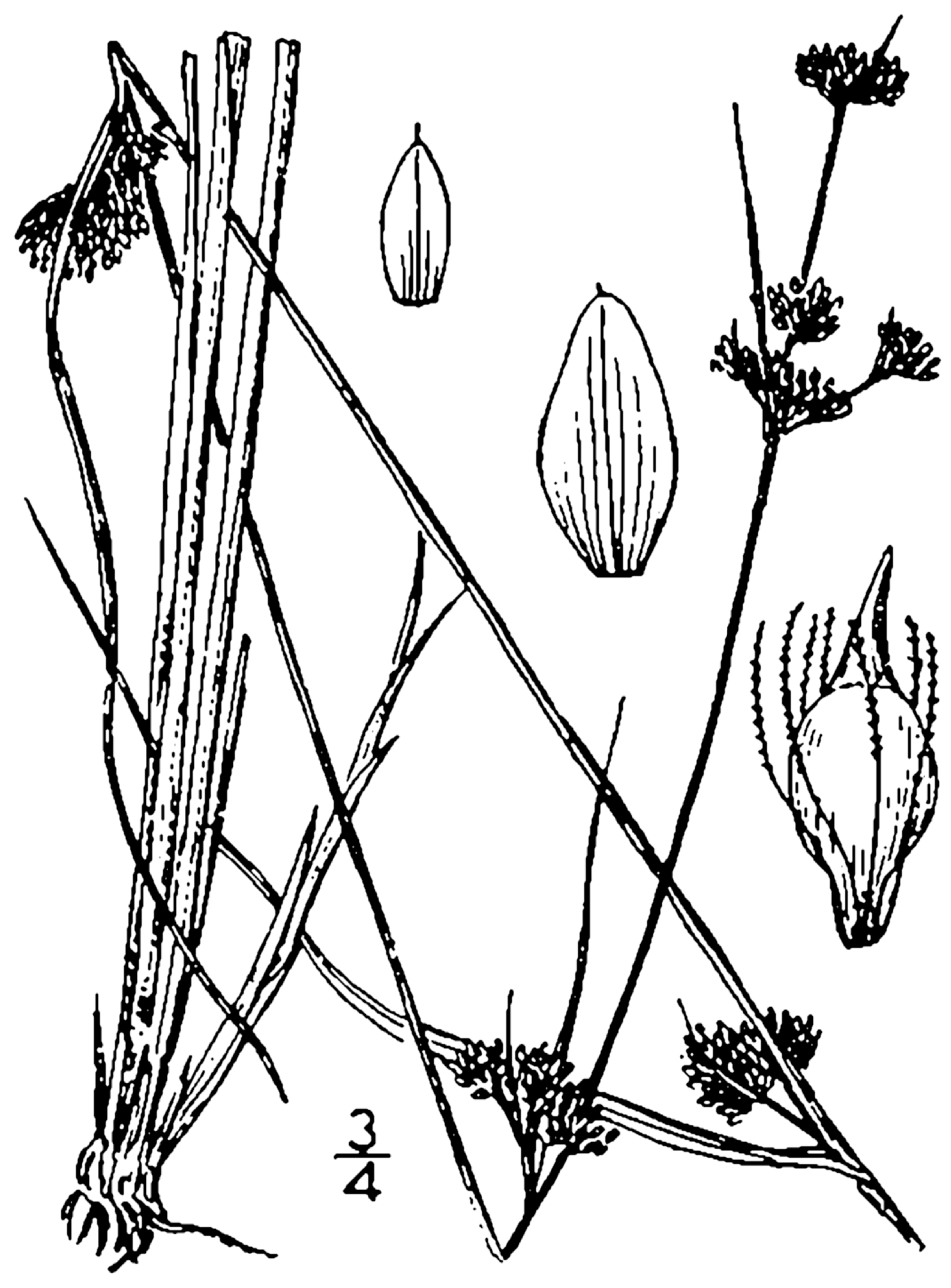

Conservation status
- Apparently Secure (NatureServe)

Scientific classification
- Kingdom: Plantae
- Clade: Tracheophytes
- Clade: Angiosperms
- Clade: Monocots
- Clade: Commelinids
- Order: Poales
- Family: Cyperaceae
- Genus: Rhynchospora
- Species: R. capillacea

Binomial name
- Rhynchospora capillacea Torr.

= Rhynchospora capillacea =

Species of grass-like plant

Rhynchospora capillacea is a species of sedge known by the common names needle beaksedge, slender beakrush and needle beakrush. It is native to eastern North America from Labrador to Alberta, and south to Texas. It grows in wet, usually calcareous habitat, such as fens, sandy or stony shores, interdunal flats, and wet meadows It is a perennial herb producing clumps of stems 10 to 40 centimetres (3.9 to 15.7 in) tall, each stem with very narrow, filiform leaves. The inflorescence consists of few (1–4) narrow brown spikelets each about 6 or 7 millimetres long.
