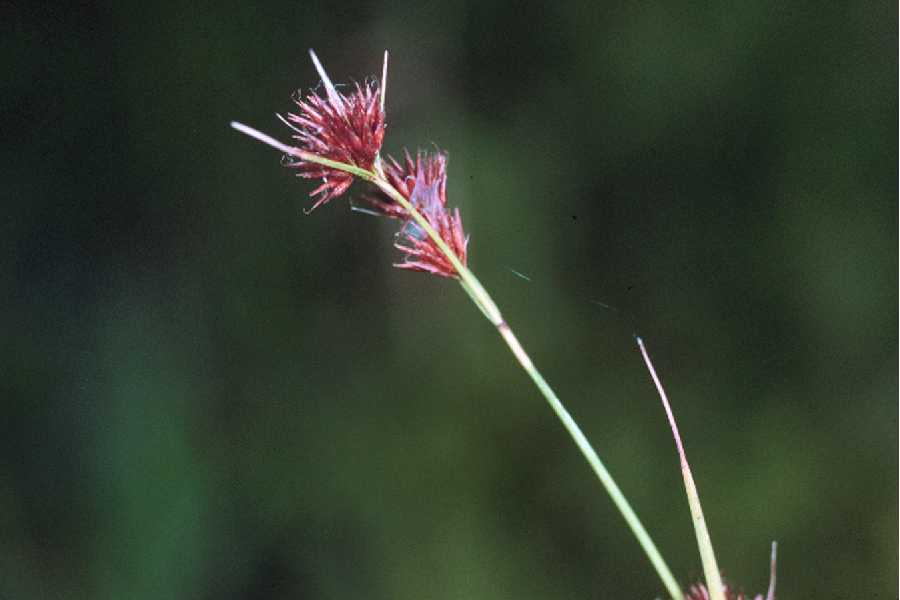
- Rhynchospora fascicularis

Scientific classification
- Kingdom: Plantae
- Clade: Embryophytes
- Clade: Tracheophytes
- Clade: Angiosperms
- Clade: Monocots
- Clade: Commelinids
- Order: Poales
- Family: Cyperaceae
- Genus: Rhynchospora; Vahl

Type species
- Rhynchospora alba (L.) Vahl.

Synonyms
- Asteroschoenus Nees; Astroschoenus Lindl.; Calyptrolepis Steud.; Calyptrostylis Nees; Cephaloschoenus Nees; Ceratoschoenus Nees; Cleistocalyx Steud.; Dichroma Ham.; Dichromena Michx.; Diplochaete Nees; Echinoschoenus Nees & Meyen; Ephippiorhynchium Nees; Eriochaeta Torr. ex Steud.; Haloschoenus Nees; Haplostylis Nees; Hygrocharis Nees; Kleistrocalyx Steud.; Leptoschoenus Nees; Lonchostylis Torr.; Microchaeta Rchb.; Micropapyrus Suess.; Mitrospora Nees; Morisia Nees; Nemochloa Nees; Nomochloa Nees; Pachymitra Nees; Phaeocephalum Ehrh; Pleurostachys Brongn.; Psilocarya Torr.; Pterochaete Arn. ex Boeckeler; Pterotheca C.Presl; Ptilochaeta Nees; Ptilosciadium Steud.; Spermodon P.Beauv. ex Lestib.; Sphaeroschoenus Nees; Syntrinema H.Pfeiff.; Trichochaeta Steud.; Triodon Pers.; Zosterospermon P.Beauv. ex Lestib.

= Rhynchospora =

Beak-sedge

Genus of flowering plants in the sedge family

Rhynchospora (beak-rush or beak-sedge) is a genus of about 400 species of sedges with a cosmopolitan distribution. The genus includes both annual and perennial species, mostly with erect 3-sided stems and 3-ranked leaves. The achenes bear a beak-like tubercule (hence the name "beak-rush", although the plants are sedges, not rushes) and are sometimes subtended by bristles. Many of the species are similar in vegetative appearance, and mature fruits are needed to make a positive identification.

The inflorescences (spikelets) are sometimes subtended by bracts which can be leaf-like or showy, often white that attract insects.

Members of this genus have holocentric chromosomes and have become a model for the study of chromosome evolution and meiotic recombination in holocentric plants. The genomes of Rhynchospora pubera, R. breviuscula, and R. tenuis have been published in 2022.

== Ecology ==
Rhynchospora occurs on all continents except Antarctica, but is most diverse in the neotropics. It is most frequent in sunny habitats with wet, acidic soils. In marshes and savannas, Rhynchospora may be the dominant form of vegetation.

== Evolution ==
Chromosome evolution models point to polyploidy as the major driver of chromosome evolution in Rhynchospora (which is characterized as having holocentric chromosomes), followed by dysploidy. Lineages that stayed in wet high acidity environments seemingly preserved low chromosome numbers and a high long terminal repeat retrotransposons (LTR-RTs) and DNA transposons content. However lineages (like those in North America) that rapidly diversified into less rainy regions underwent multiple fission events accompanied by a quick loss of LTR-RTs due to holokinetic drive and environmental constraints.

A time-calibrated phylogenetic analysis of 115 taxa within the tribe, together with 11 outgroup taxa, estimated the mean crown-group age of the tribe at approximately 43.2 million years. Ancestral state reconstruction using stochastic character mapping inferred that the most recent common ancestor (MRCA) occupied open (savanna) habitats. This habitat type accounted for 77% of the total reconstructed branch lengths across the phylogeny. Despite this predominance, an average of 22 independent transitions from open habitats to forest understory or forest-edge environments were inferred among descendant lineages. The ancestral soil association was reconstructed as seasonally wet savanna soils. Occurrence in dry, well-drained soils was reconstructed along 4% of the total branch lengths, with an estimated mean of 11.2 independent transitions to this condition. An average of 3.7 transitions were inferred to habitats characterized by standing or flowing water. Changes in inflorescence traits were also reconstructed. An average of 5.9 transitions from nondescript brown or green inflorescences associated with wind pollination to white (or occasionally other color) spikelets and/or bracts associated with insect pollination were inferred. These transitions were not correlated with shifts to forest habitats. Taxa exhibiting C_{4} photosynthetic anatomy formed a distinct clade that diverged from a sister clade comprising taxa with C3 photosynthetic anatomy approximately 26 million years ago, earlier than previously estimated.

== Taxonomy ==
Contemporary taxonomic treatments include Rhynchospora and the related genus Pleurostachys in the tribe Rhynchosporae, a well-supported clade within Cyperaceae. The most comprehensive monograph of the genus divides Rhynchospora into two subgenera and 29 sections. A recent molecular analysis identifies two primary clades within the genus, with well-supported subgroups that agree with several of the sections identified by Kükenthal. However, this molecular analysis also suggests that Pleurostachys is embedded within one of the primary clades of Rhynchospora and that several of the recognized sections are not monophyletic.

Selected species

- Rhynchospora alba – White beak-sedge. Europe, North America
- Rhynchospora caduca – Southeast North America
- Rhynchospora californica – California beaked-rush, occurring in Marin and Sonoma County, California
- Rhynchospora capillacea – Slender beakrush. Eastern North America
- Rhynchospora capitellata – Brownish beak-sedge
- Rhynchospora colorata – White star sedge. Southeast North America
- Rhynchospora fusca – Brown beak-sedge. Europe
- Rhynchospora glomerata – Clustered beak-sedge. North America.
- Rhynchospora inexpansa – Southeastern North America and West Indies
- Rhynchospora knieskernii – Knieskern's beak-sedge
- Rhynchospora longisetis
- Rhynchospora macrostachya – Tall horned beaksedge. Eastern North America
- Rhynchospora megalocarpa – Southeastern United States
- Rhynchospora megaplumosa – Florida
- Rhynchospora nervosa – Tropical New World
- Rhynchospora rariflora – Southeastern North America, West Indies, Central America
- Rhynchospora scirpoides – North America
- Rhynchospora waspamensis – New World

== Other sources ==
- Acevedo-Rodríguez, P. & Strong, M.T. (2005). Monocotyledons and Gymnosperms of Puerto Rico and the Virgin Islands. Contributions from the United States National Herbarium 52: 1–415.
- Gale, S. 1944. Rhynchospora sect. Eurhynchospora in Canada, the United States and the West Indies. Rhodora 46: 80–134, 159–197, 255–278.
- Kral, R. 1996. Supplemental notes on Rhynchospora crinipes and related species in sect. Fuscae (Cyperaceae). Sida 17: 385–411.
- Strong, M.T. (2006). Taxonomy and distribution of Rhynchospora (Cyperaceae) in the Guianas, South America. Contributions from the United States National Herbarium 53: 1–225.
- Thomas, W. W. 1994. 1. Rhynchospora Vahl. 6: 404–422. In G. Davidse, M. Sousa Sánchez & A.O. Chater (eds.) Flora Mesoamericana. Universidad Nacional Autónoma de México, México, D. F.
