= Rhynchospora californica =

Conservation status
- Critically Imperiled (NatureServe)

Scientific classification
- Kingdom: Plantae
- Clade: Tracheophytes
- Clade: Angiosperms
- Clade: Monocots
- Clade: Commelinids
- Order: Poales
- Family: Cyperaceae
- Genus: Rhynchospora
- Species: R. californica

Binomial name
- Rhynchospora californica Gale

Species of grass-like plant

Rhynchospora californica is a species of sedge known by the common names California beaked-rush and California beaksedge. It is endemic to California where it is mainly distributed in the northwestern corner of the state south to the San Francisco Bay Area. It bears long, thin stems topped with dense inflorescences of dark brown flowers enfolding grainlike fruits that have white-fuzzy tubercles. It is a plant of marshes and bogs.
