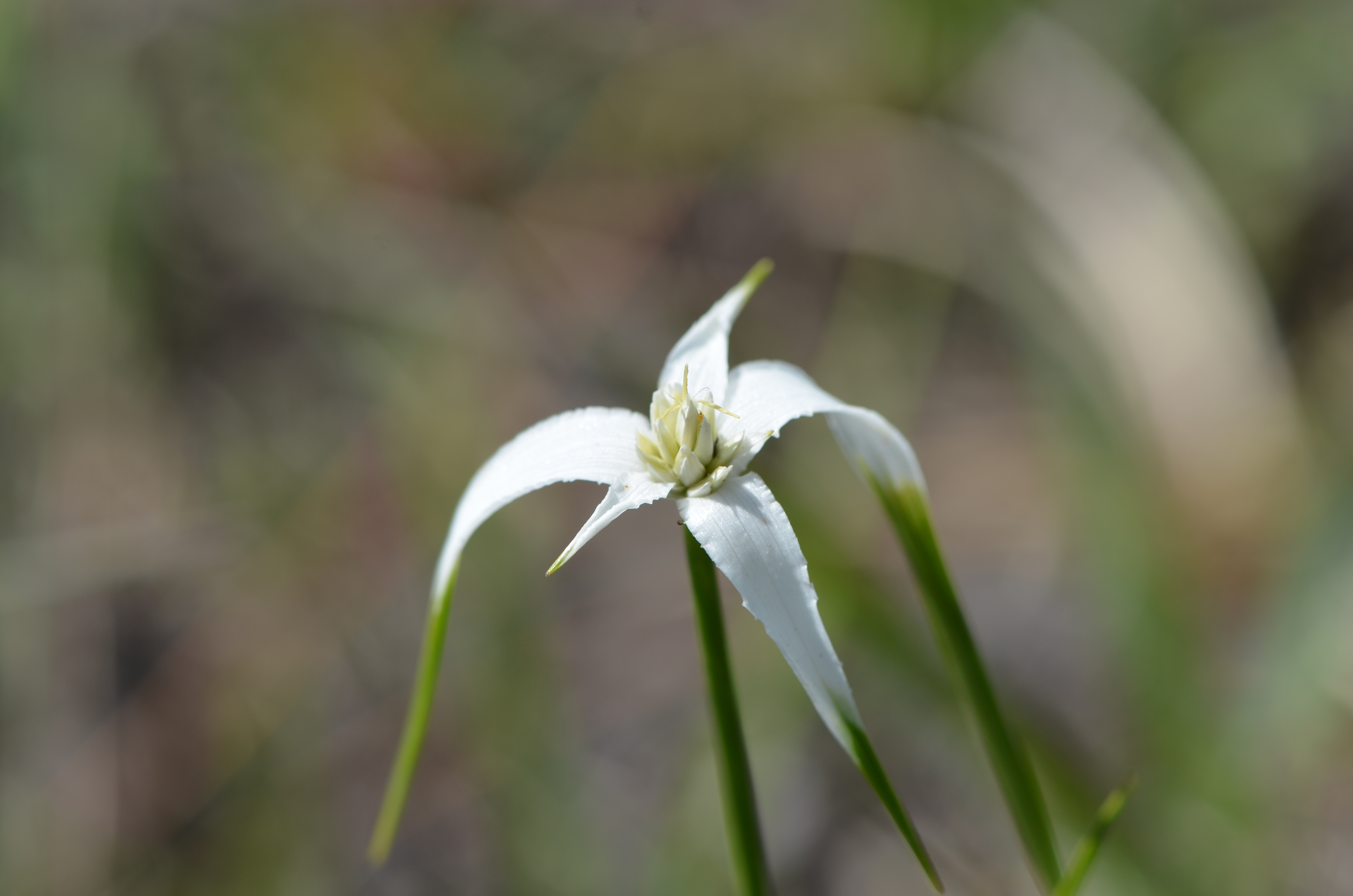

Conservation status
- Least Concern (IUCN 3.1)

Scientific classification
- Kingdom: Plantae
- Clade: Tracheophytes
- Clade: Angiosperms
- Clade: Monocots
- Clade: Commelinids
- Order: Poales
- Family: Cyperaceae
- Genus: Rhynchospora
- Species: R. colorata

Binomial name
- Rhynchospora colorata (Hitchcock) H.Pfeiff.

= Rhynchospora colorata =

Species of grass-like plant

Rhynchospora colorata, also known as starrush whitetop, white star sedge and white-topped sedge, is a perennial flowering plant in the sedge family. It has white bracts, giving it the appearance of white petals with long, green points. It is native to southeastern North America, from Virginia west to New Mexico in the United States, and south into the Caribbean islands.

The inflorescence is a dense cluster of small spikes, each containing several tiny flowers. It sits on top of 3–10 green and white bracts that grow to 10–15 cm long. These bracts look much like leaves, but the actual leaves arise from the base of the plant.

== Gallery ==
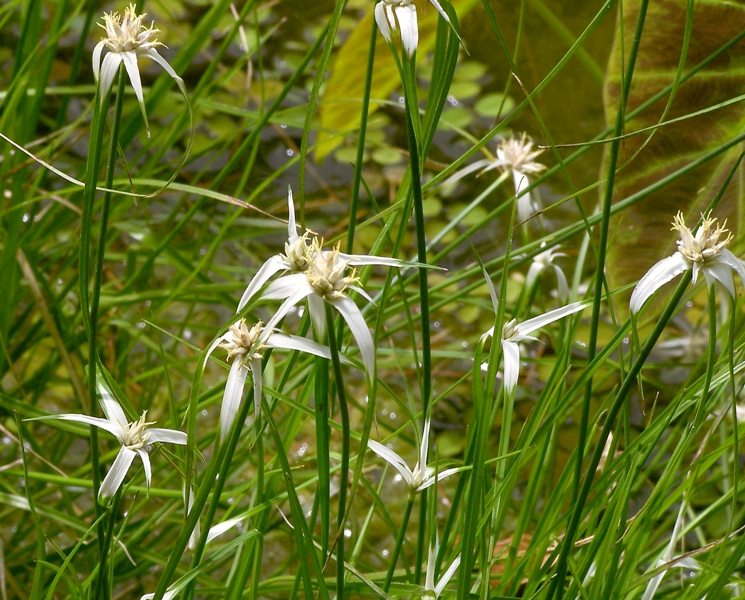

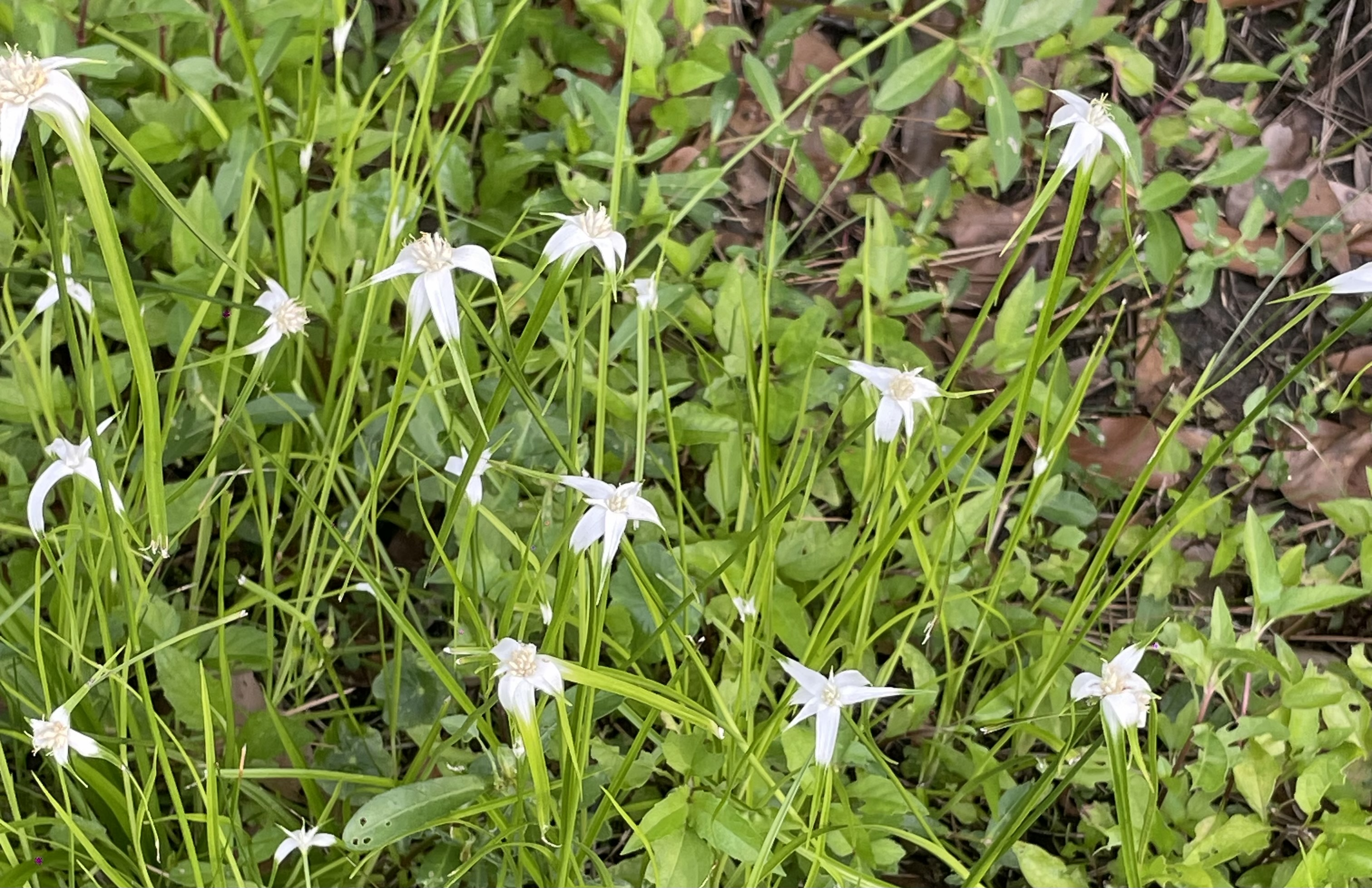
