= Nymph (disambiguation) =

In Greek mythology, a nymph or nymphe (Ancient Greek: νύμφη) is a female nature-spirit.

Nymph or nymphe may also mean:

== Flora and fauna ==
- Nymph (biology), the immature form of an insect having incomplete metamorphosis
- Nymph (fishing), a lure that imitates an insect nymph
- Jungle nymph, a type of large stick insect found in Malaysia
- Water nymph, several species of aquatic plants in the Nymphaeaceae family
- Tree nymph, butterflies of the genus Idea
- Wood nymph, butterflies of the genus Cercyonis
- Wood nymph, moths of the genus Eudryas

== Literature ==
- The Nymphs (poem), by Leigh Hunt, published in 1818
- Nymph, the "Beta Angeloid: Electronic Warfare Type" in the anime Sora no Otoshimono from the manga series Heaven's Lost Property

== Movies and television ==
- Nymph (1973 film), a 1973 American film
- The Nymph (Ninfa plebea), a 1996 Italian film directed by Lina Wertmüller
- Nymph (2009 film), a 2009 Thai film
- Nymphs (TV series), a 2013 Finnish television series
- Mamula (film), a 2014 Serbian-American film

== Music ==
- Nymphs (band), a 1990s US-American alternative rock band
- Nymphs (album), an album by The Nymphs released in 1991
- "Nymph", a song by Brooke Candy from the 2019 album Sexorcism
- Nymph (album), a 2022 album by British rapper Shygirl

== Ships ==
- French ship Nymphe, various French Navy ships
- HMS Nymph, a Royal Navy sloop launched in 1778
- HMS Nymphe, the name of several Royal Navy ships
- USS Nymph (1863), a United States Navy steamer that served in the American Civil War

== Other uses ==
- 875 Nymphe, a minor planet that orbits the Sun
- NAC Freelance, an airplane originally known as the BN-3 Nymph
- Nymph (Central Figure for "The Three Graces"), a bronze sculpture in Washington, D.C.
- Nymph (Dungeons & Dragons), a monster in the Dungeons & Dragons role-playing game
- Nymph, Alabama, a populated place in Conecuh County, Alabama, United States
- Nymphomaniac, a term for hypersexuality

== See also ==
- Nymphet
- Nymphadora Tonks, Harry Potter character
- Nympha (disambiguation)
