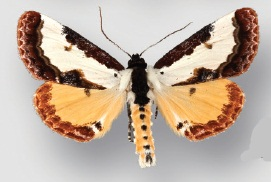
- Male

Scientific classification
- Kingdom: Animalia
- Phylum: Arthropoda
- Clade: Pancrustacea
- Class: Insecta
- Order: Lepidoptera
- Superfamily: Noctuoidea
- Family: Noctuidae
- Genus: Eudryas
- Species: E. unio

Binomial name
- Eudryas unio (Hübner, [1831])

Synonyms
- Euthisanotia unio Hübner, [1831]

= Eudryas unio =

Species of moth

Eudryas unio, the pearly wood-nymph, is a species of moth of the family Noctuidae. It is found in most of the eastern United States from central New Hampshire and southern Ontario, south to southern Florida. In the west it ranges to the eastern Great Plains, south to southern Texas and Veracruz along the eastern coast of Mexico.

The wingspan is 26–35 mm. Adults are on wing from May to August. The larvae feed on Vitis, Oenothera biennis, Ludwigia, Lythrum, Decodon verticillatus and Hibiscus.

Eudryas brevipennis was once considered a possible subspecies of Eudryas unio, however, the genitalia of both sexes differ between the species.
