= Ninfa =

Ninfa may refer to:

- Garden of Ninfa, a landscape garden in central Italy
- Santa Ninfa, a town and comune in Sicily, southern Italy
- Punta Ninfas in Chubut Province, Patagonia, Argentina
- Ninfa, a 12th-13th centuries town in Italy, near Norba
- Ninfa, a 3rd century Christian saint and patron of Palermo; see Tryphon, Respicius, and Nympha
- Santa Ninfa dei Crociferi, a Baroque-Mannerist church of Palermo
- Ninfa plebea, a 1996 Italian comedy-drama film directed by Lina Wertmüller
- La fida ninfa, an opera by Antonio Vivaldi to a libretto by Scipione Maffei

== People ==
- Ninfa Baronio (1874-1969) was an Italian-American anarcha-feminist activist
- Ninfa Huarachi (born 24 December 1955), Bolivian politician and trade unionist
- Ninfa Laurenzo, (May 11, 1924 – June 17, 2001), a restaurateur from Houston, Texas who founded the restaurant Ninfa's
- Ninfa Marra (born 3 July 1974), a Venezuelan former professional tennis player.
- Ninfa Salinas Sada (born May 1, 1980), a Mexican politician, and former Mexican Senator
- Ninfa Segarra (born June 4, 1950) is the last President of the New York City Board of Education

== See also ==
- Nympha (disambiguation)
