= Huarachi =

Huarachi may refer to:

- Huarachi Kkollu, mountain in Bolivia

== People with the name ==
- Ninfa Huarachi (born 1955), Bolivian politician
