= SMS Nymphe =

SMS Nymphe is the name of the following ships of the German Navy

- SMS Nymphe (1863), lead Nymphe-class corvette, broken up in 1891
- SMS Nymphe (1899), a Gazelle-class cruiser, scrapped in 1932
- SMS Nymphe (1940), a Norwegian coastal defence ship captured in 1940, returned to Norway after WWII

== See also ==
- Nymphe (disambiguation)
