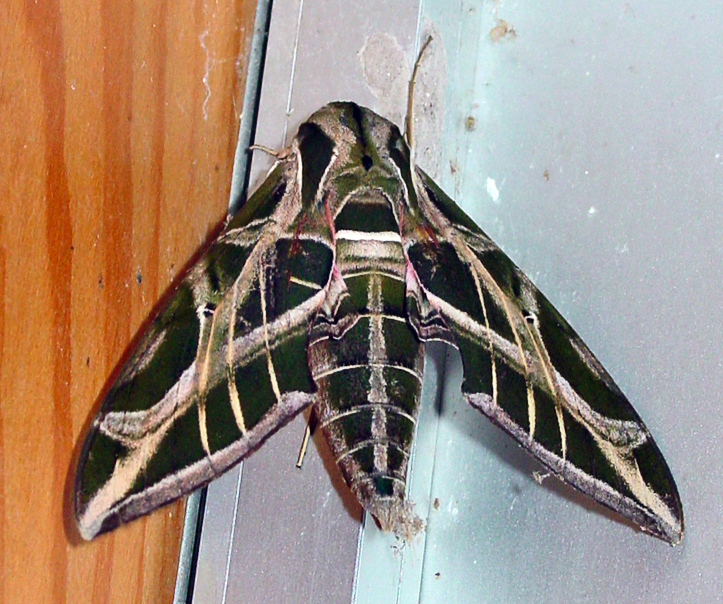

Scientific classification
- Kingdom: Animalia
- Phylum: Arthropoda
- Class: Insecta
- Order: Lepidoptera
- Family: Sphingidae
- Genus: Eumorpha
- Species: E. vitis

Binomial name
- Eumorpha vitis (Linnaeus, 1758)

Synonyms
- Sphinx vitis Linnaeus, 1758; Philampelus linnei Grote & Robinson, 1865; Philampelus hornbeckiana Harris, 1839; Eumorpha vitis pallida Closs, 1917; Pholus vitis hesperidum Kirby, 1880; Pholus vitis fuscatus Rothschild & Jordan, 1906

= Eumorpha vitis =

Vine sphinx

Species of moth

Eumorpha vitis, known as the vine sphinx, is a moth of the family Sphingidae.

== Distribution ==
It lives from Argentina north through Central America, the West Indies, and Mexico to southern Arizona, Texas, Mississippi, and Florida. Strays north to Nebraska.

== Description ==
The wingspan is 85–105 mm.

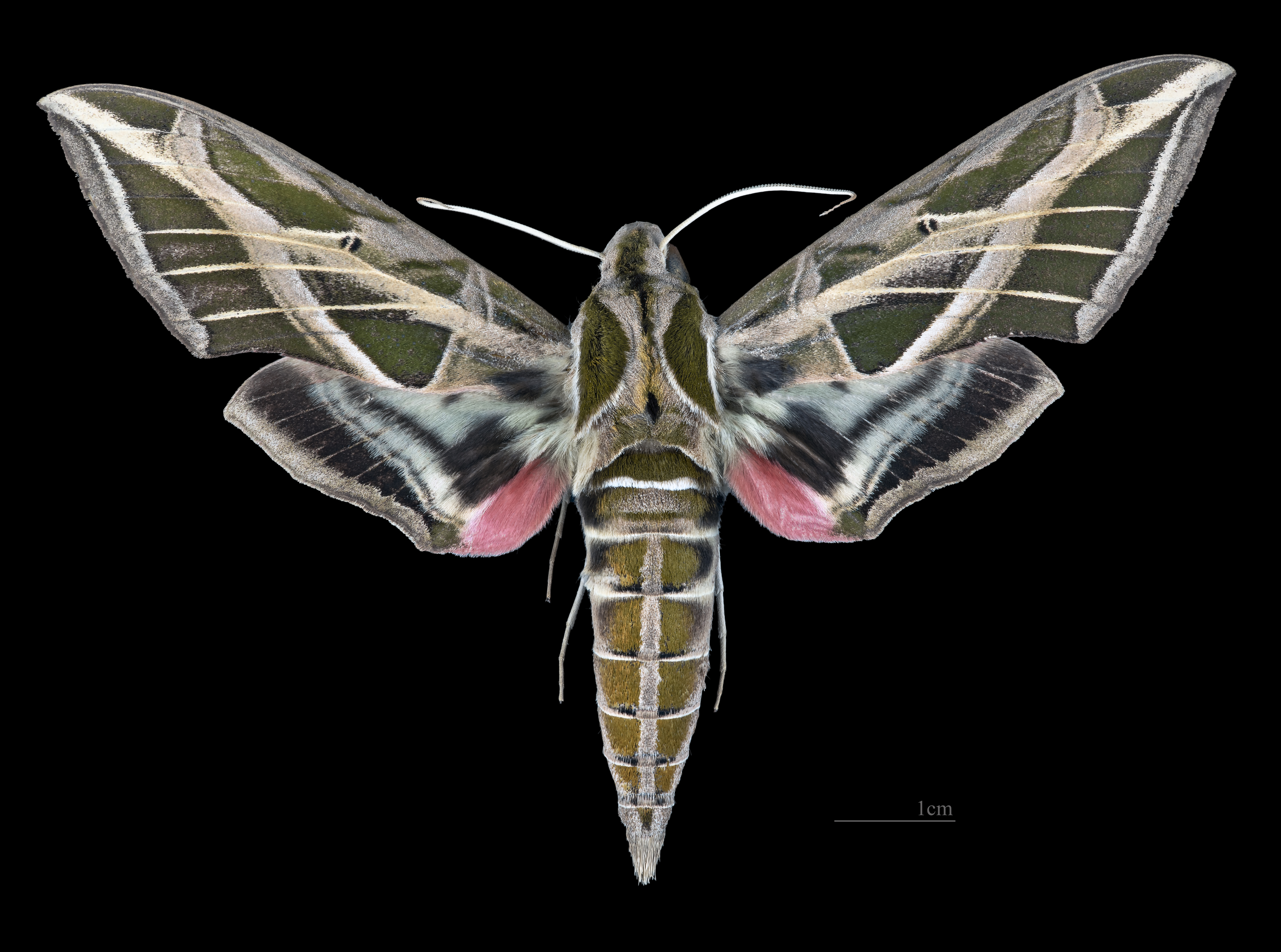
Male dorsal

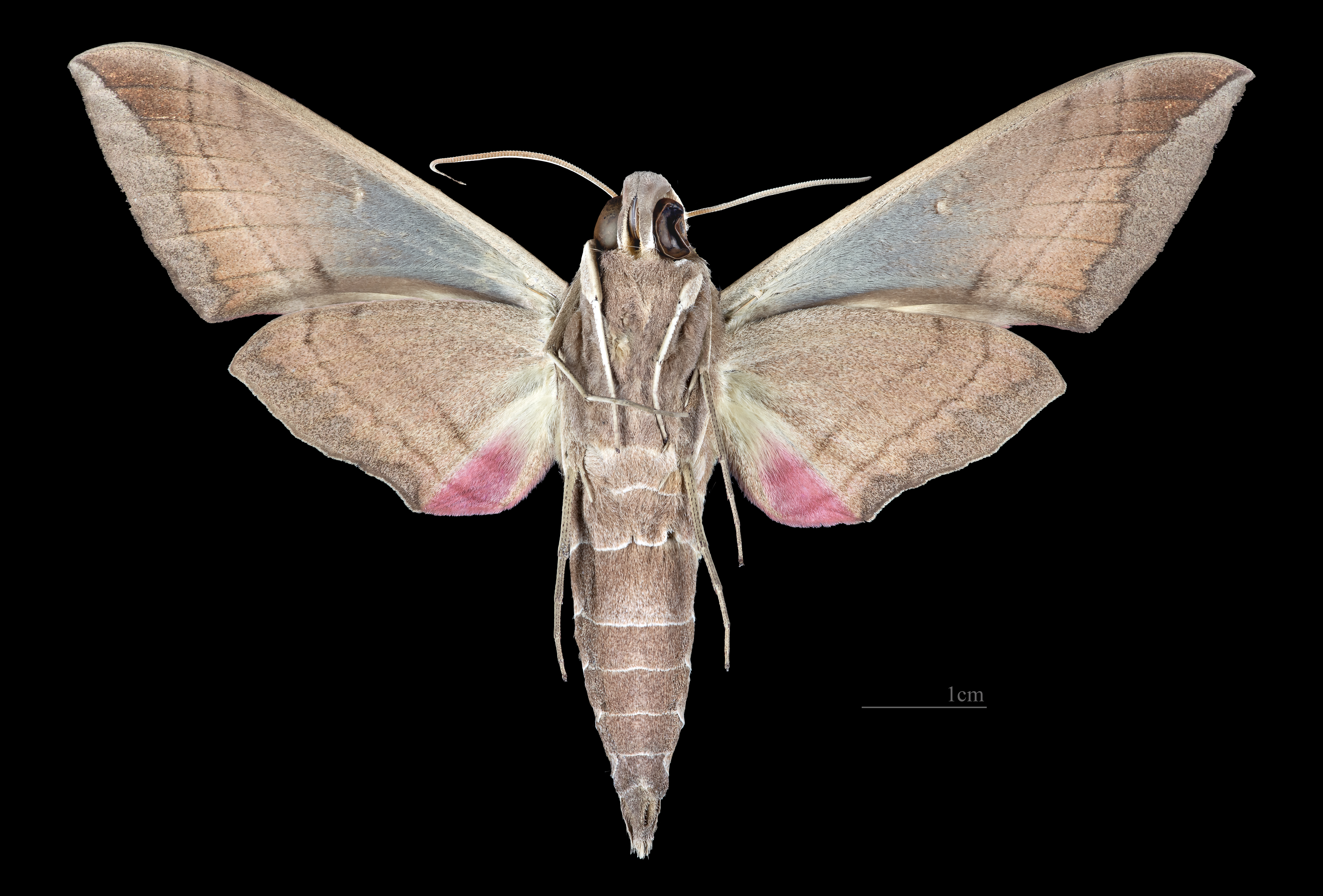
Male ventral

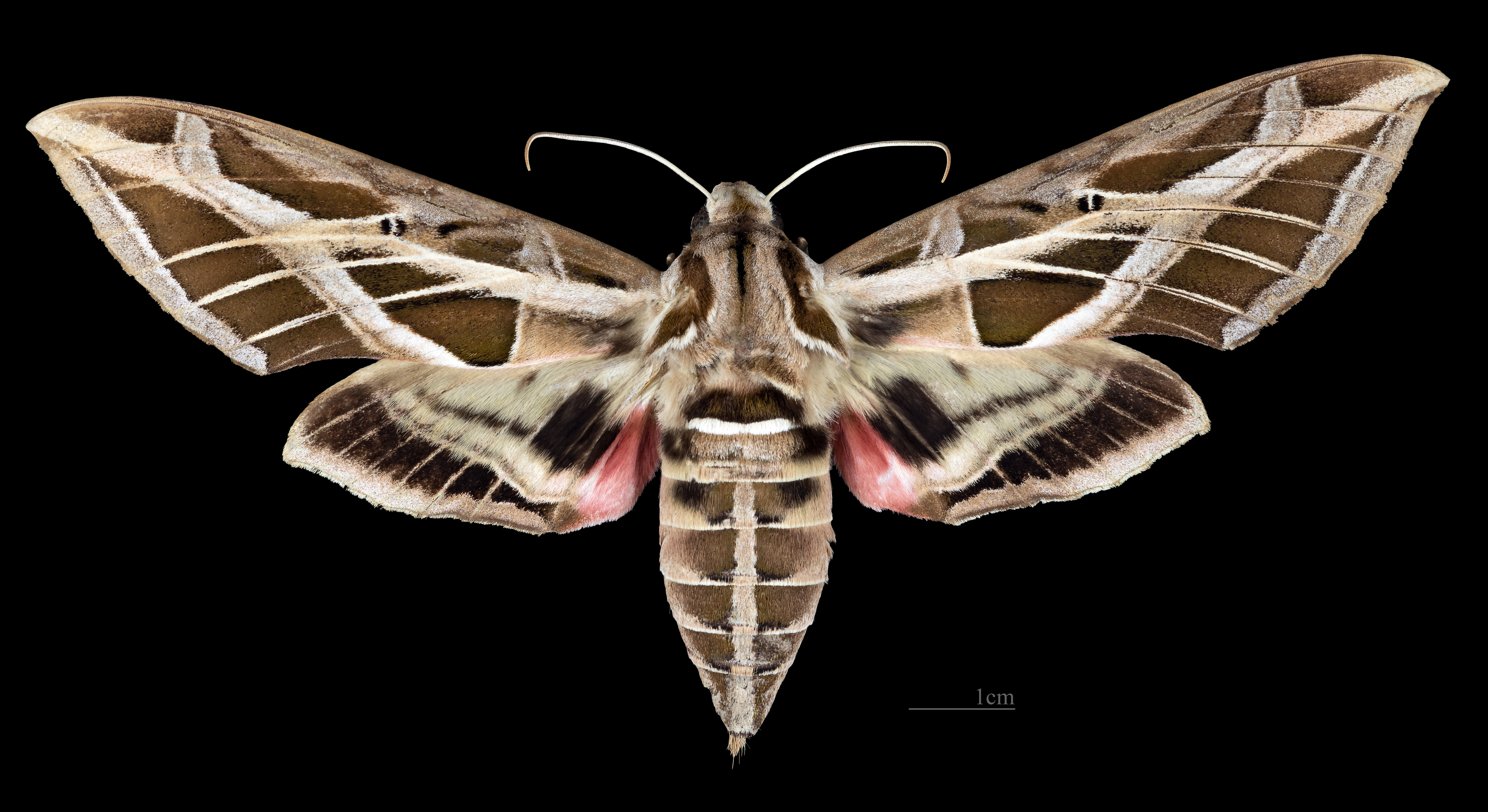
Female dorsal

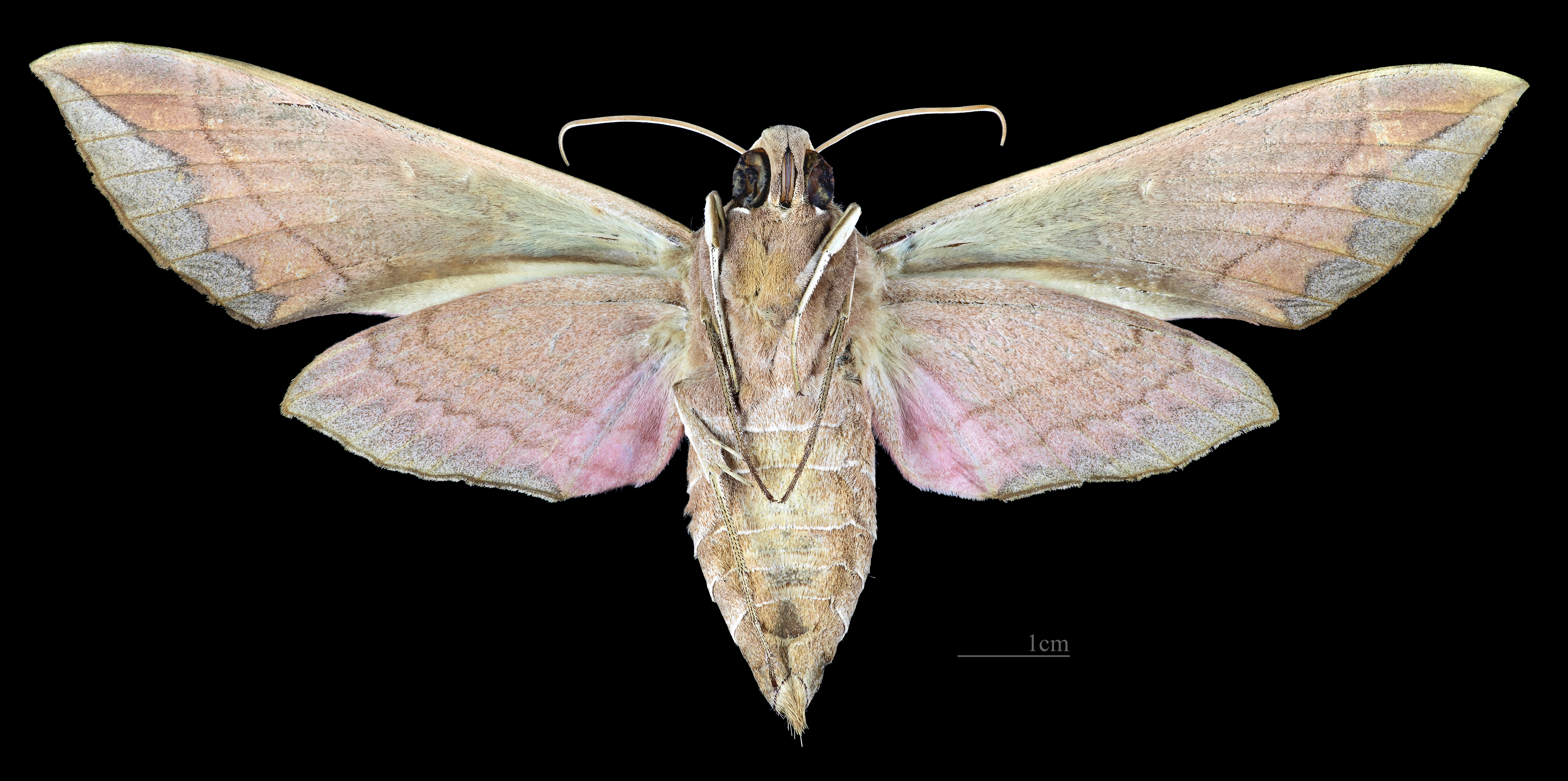
Female ventral

== Biology ==
Adults are on wing from April to May and again from July to October in Florida, from July to September in one generation in the northern part of the range and year-round in the tropics. They feed on the nectar of various flowers, including Vinca rosea.

The larvae feed on Vitis species (including Vitis vinifera), Cissus species (including Cissus incisa, Cissus pseudosicyoides, Cissus rhombifolia, Cissus sicycoides and Cissus verticillata), Ludwigia decurrens, Ludwigia erecta, Magnolia virginiana and Parthenocissus species.

== Subspecies ==
- Eumorpha vitis vitis (Argentina, Bolivia, Brazil, Colombia, Ecuador, Peru, French Guiana, Guyana, Paraguay, Suriname, Uruguay, Venezuela, Mexico, Belize, Guatemala, Honduras, Nicaragua, Costa Rica, Panama, the Caribbean, southern United States)
- Eumorpha vitis fuscatus - (Rothschild & Jordan, 1906) (St. Lucia, Guadeloupe and Martinique)
- Eumorpha vitis hesperidum - (Kirby, 1880) (Jamaica)
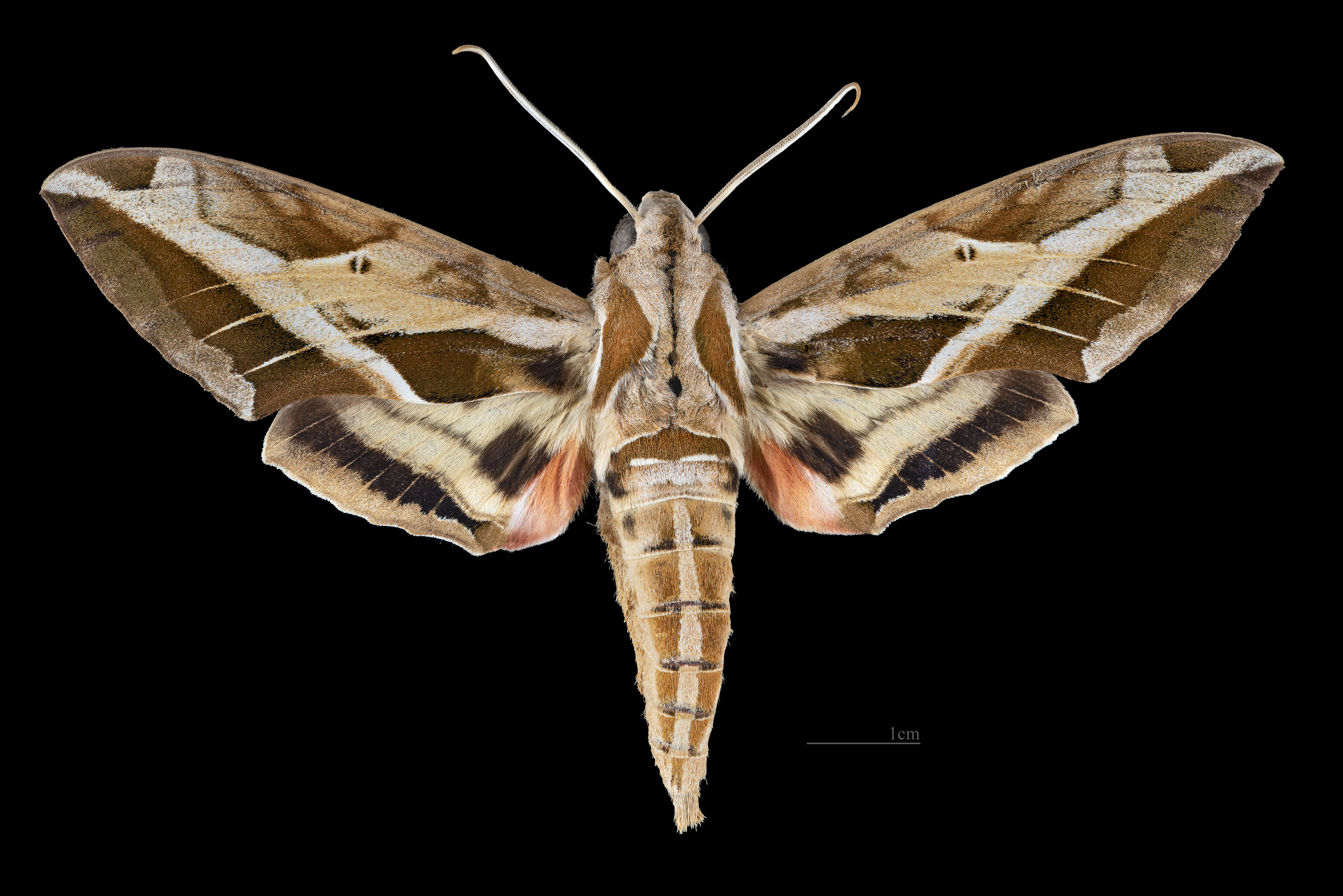
Eumorpha vitis fuscatus
Male dorsal

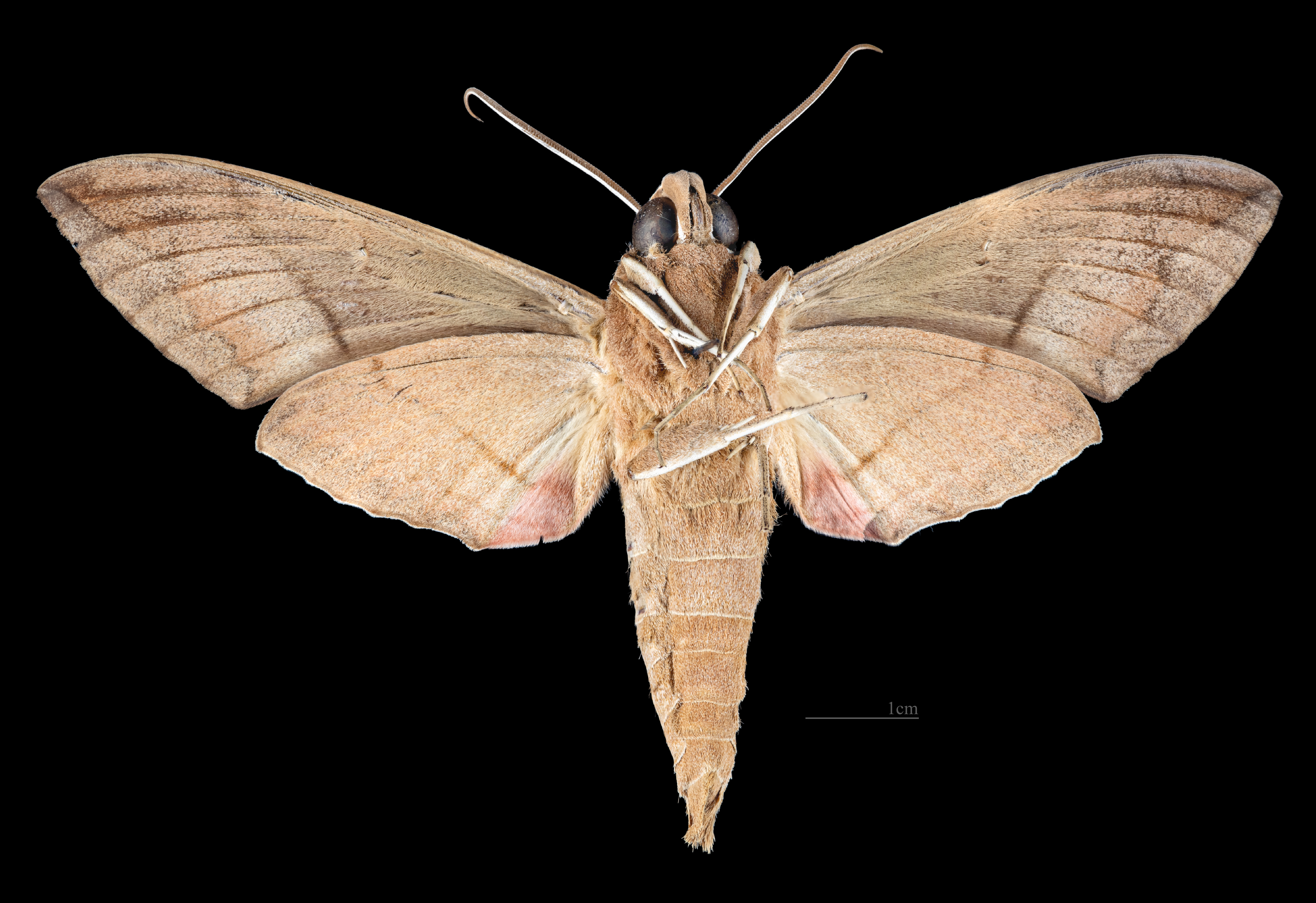
Eumorpha vitis fuscatus
Male ventral

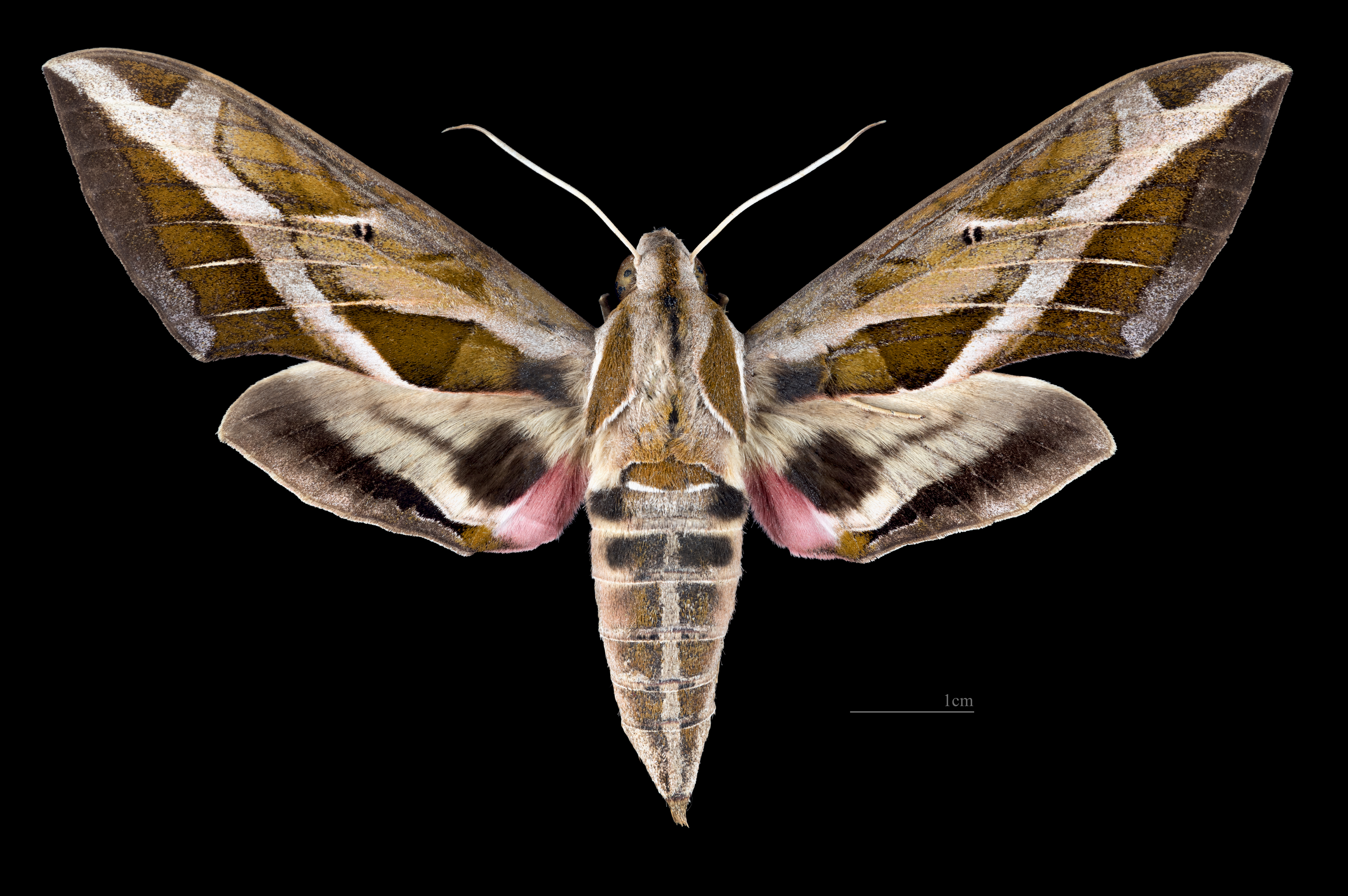
Eumorpha vitis fuscatus
Female dorsal

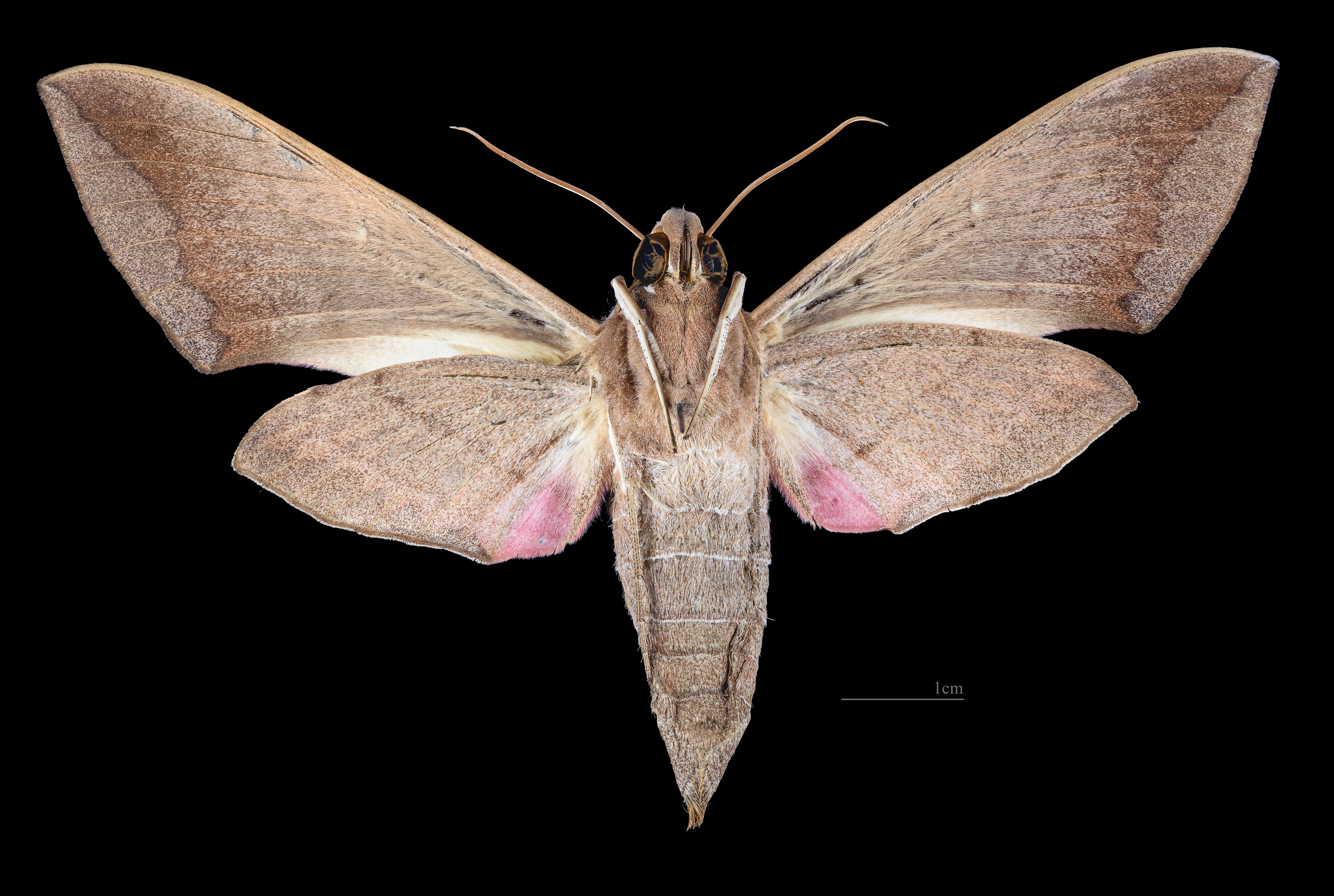
Eumorpha vitis fuscatus
Female ventral
