= Isnardia palustris =

Isnardia palustris is a botanical synonym of two species of plant:

- Hippuris vulgaris, synonym published in 1823 by Johann Wilhelm Ludwig von Lucé
- Ludwigia palustris, the original name for the species published in 1753 synonym by Carl Linnaeus
