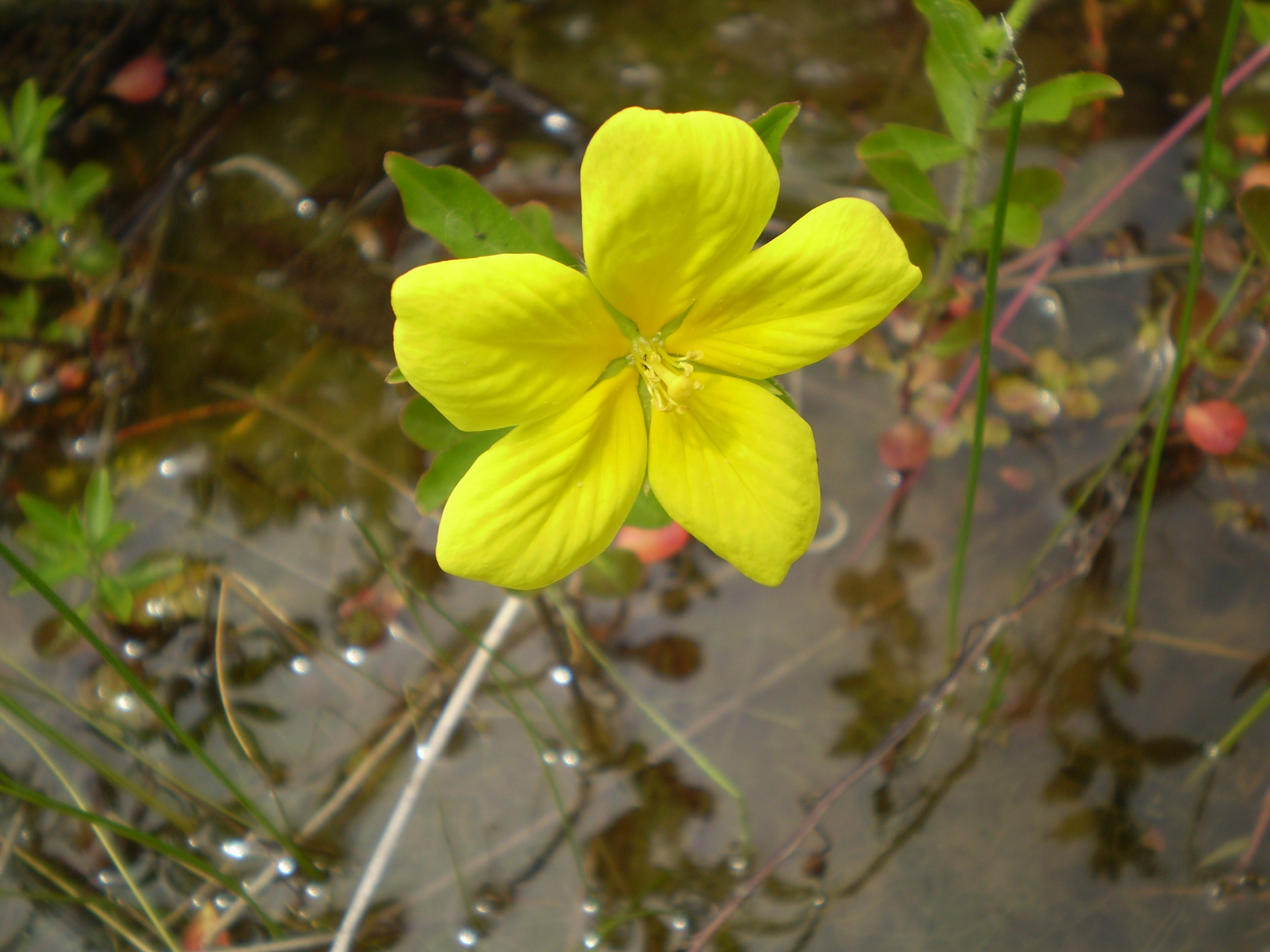

Scientific classification
- Kingdom: Plantae
- Clade: Tracheophytes
- Clade: Angiosperms
- Clade: Eudicots
- Clade: Rosids
- Order: Myrtales
- Family: Onagraceae
- Genus: Ludwigia
- Species: L. grandiflora

Binomial name
- Ludwigia grandiflora (Michx.) Greuter & Burdet

Synonyms
- List: Adenola grandiflora (Michx.) Raf.; Jussiaea grandiflora Michx.; Jussiaea grandiflora f. natans Glück; Jussiaea grandiflora f. semiserrata Glück; Jussiaea grandiflora f. terrestris Glück; Jussiaea michauxiana Fernald; Jussiaea repens subsp. grandiflora (Michx.) P.Fourn.; Jussiaea repens var. grandiflora (Michx.) Micheli; Jussiaea repens var. grandiflora Micheli; Jussiaea repens var. hispida Hauman; Jussiaea repens f. intermedia Hassl.; Jussiaea repens var. major Hassl.; Jussiaea repens var. uruguayensis Hassl.; Jussiaea uruguayensis Cambess.; Jussiaea uruguayensis var. genuina Munz; Jussiaea uruguayensis f. major (Hassl.) Munz; Ludwigia clavellina var. grandiflora (Michx.) M.Gómez; Ludwigia uruguayensis (Cambess.) H.Hara; Ludwigia uruguayensis var. major (Hassl.) Munz

= Ludwigia grandiflora =

Species of flowering plant in the willowherb family

Ludwigia grandiflora, the water primrose, is an aquatic plant of the order Myrtales.

It is closely related and easily confused with Ludwigia hexapetala. The two species can be distinguished at a chromosomal level, because L. grandiflora is hexaploid and L. hexapetala is decaploid. However, they can be distinguished morphologically. L. grandiflora has villous hairs, smaller flowers and smaller pollen grains. Some authorities consider that these differences are too slight to consider these different species and so separate these taxa as two varieties or two subspecies.

== Invasive species ==
Ludwigia grandiflora has been listed on the List of Invasive Alien Species of Union concern since 2016 and in the United States it is on the South Carolina State-listed Noxious Weed list. It out-competes other plants by forming dense mats at the margins and in ponds. It is introduced to warm temperate areas of North America, Japan and Europe and has formed large stable populations, particularly in France. As of summer 2024, the Portuguese city of Arganil announces measures against the species in its river Alva.

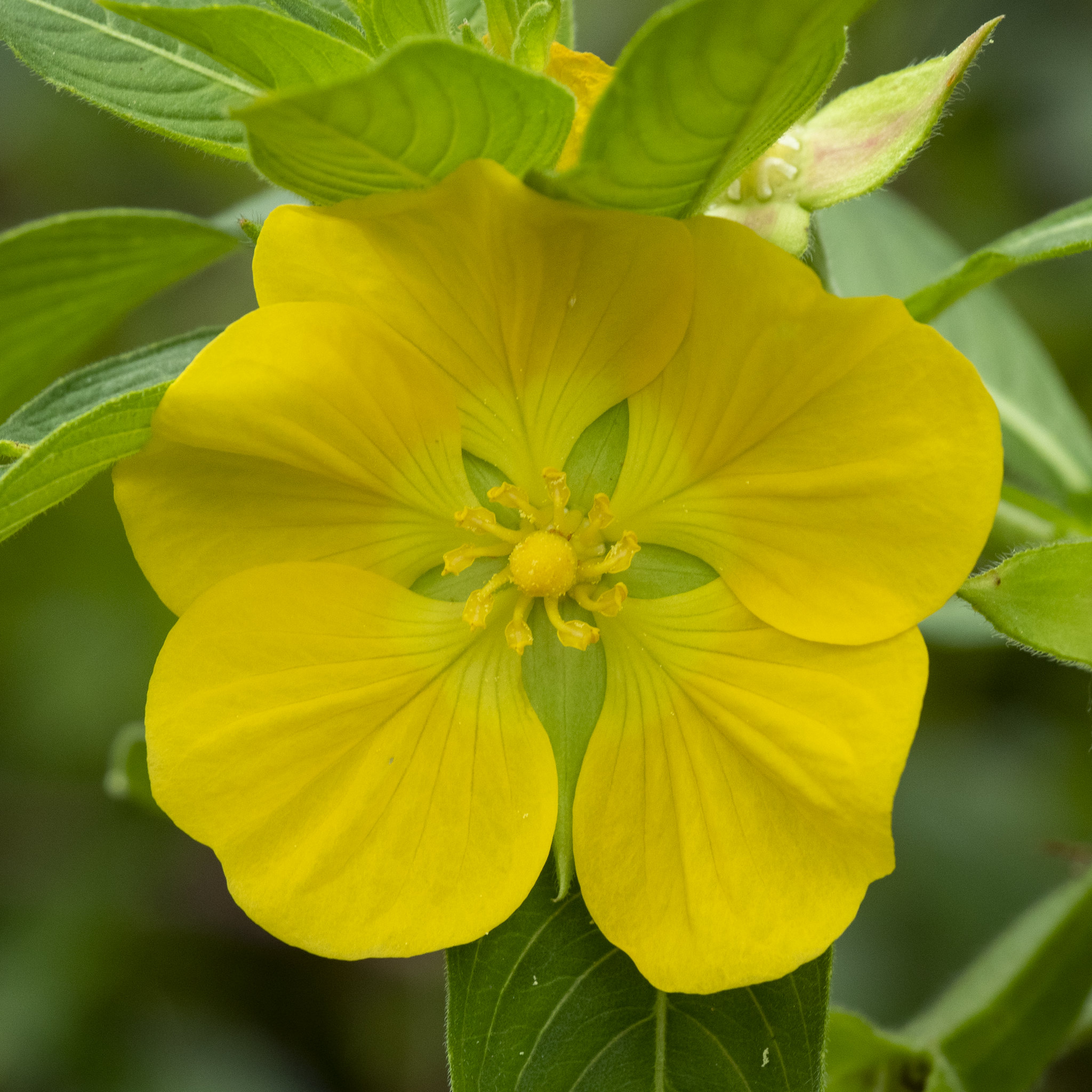
Ludwigia grandiflora found in the Lower Hillsborough River Wilderness Preserve in Florida.

== Life history ==
Ludwigia grandiflora can, and does, produce viable seed, but it is also highly effective at vegetative reproduction and apparently recruitment of new plants from seed is low. The large showy flowers attract a wide variety of insects. A study in Belgium, where L. grandiflora is introduced, showed that the flowers are visited by a wide variety of insects including bees, Lepidoptera, beetles and hoverflies.
