= Ludwigia helminthorrhiza =

Scientific classification
- Kingdom: Plantae
- Clade: Tracheophytes
- Clade: Angiosperms
- Clade: Eudicots
- Clade: Rosids
- Order: Myrtales
- Family: Onagraceae
- Genus: Ludwigia
- Species: L. helminthorrhiza

Binomial name
- Ludwigia helminthorrhiza Mart.

Species of flowering plant

Ludwigia helminthorrhiza, known commonly as floating Ludwigia, originally known as Jussiaea natans Bonpl. or Jussiaea helminthorrhiza C. Martius is a herbaceous perennial plant of the family Onagraceae. Native to south Mexico, Colombia and South America, its habitat includes wet, swampy localities.

== Physiology ==
Ludwigia helminthorrhiza grows from the water's edge into the water and along the stem and roots develops 1 - 1.2 cm long white rootlets which function as floating bodies to keep the main plant floating on the surface. At each nodus, the plant may develop roots, which may reach through the water to the bottom of the water. The flowers have white petals and oval to almost round shaped leaves.
