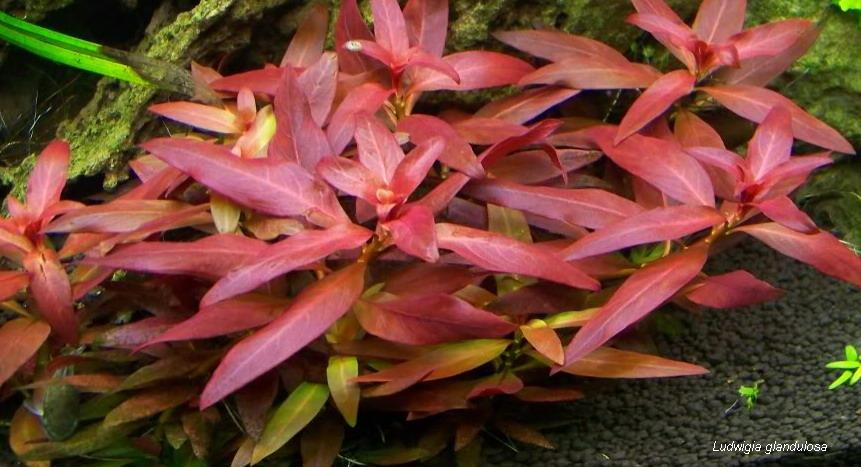

Scientific classification
- Kingdom: Plantae
- Clade: Tracheophytes
- Clade: Angiosperms
- Clade: Eudicots
- Clade: Rosids
- Order: Myrtales
- Family: Onagraceae
- Genus: Ludwigia
- Species: L. glandulosa

Binomial name
- Ludwigia glandulosa Walter

= Ludwigia glandulosa =

Cylindricfruit primrose-willow

Species of flowering plant

Ludwigia glandulosa, the small-flowered seedbox or the cylindricfruit primrose-willow, is an amphibious plant from southeast United States. It can grow partially or fully submerged. It grows very slowly and needs carbon dioxide in order to grow well. The leaves of this plant will turn greener if insufficient light is provided.

== Distribution and conservation status ==
Ludwigia glandulosa can be found in wetland areas and roadside ditches throughout most of the southern states in North America. It is a threatened species in Indiana and endangered in Maryland. When including these wetland plant species, necessary protections may be restricted to the wetland and a buffer area. However, special precautions beyond the normal 100-foot buffer may be needed in order to protect the plants from invasive species and human activities. It is imperative that recommendations and guidance be done from the Maryland Department of Natural Resources before disturbance occurs.

== Habitat and ecology ==
Ludwigia glandulosa is a plant that has a difficult time growing in most environments. As long as phosphates and nitrates are present in any amount, the plant will benefit from it tremendously. It is a perennial that will grow up to a foot and three inches maximum. Ludwigia glandulosa needs warm temperatures and much light in order to survive.

The study of the association between climate and the regeneration of species can give substantial information about the effects of climate change for the future distribution of natural ecosystems. Studies have now been employed in order to find information on the regenerative response to some plants in agreement to how landscapes change the environment. Fourteen species of swamp plants were observed in order to see their patterns in flooded and non-flooded areas. Some species, including Ludwigia glandulosa did not germinate in flooded conditions.

== Morphology ==
Individuals of this species are perennials that grow as herb/forb(s). They can grow up to a foot and six inches. With a lot of light, they will be red/purple in color. If insufficient light is present, they will fade to a green color. To check for another sign of poor growth, the lower leaves of the plant will start to shed off before the entire plant dies. Ludwigia glandulosa will grow to a maximum height of about 40 cm and requires the water to be a pH of about 6-7.5.

== Usage ==
Four stems of this plant is sometimes bought for about three American dollars and used in aquariums as a mid-ground/focal point plant or as a background plant. With sufficient light, the red/purple leaves will thrive and provide a very aesthetic setting in the aquarium. As stated before, carbon dioxide would need to be added frequently to the aquarium in order for the plant to grow well.
