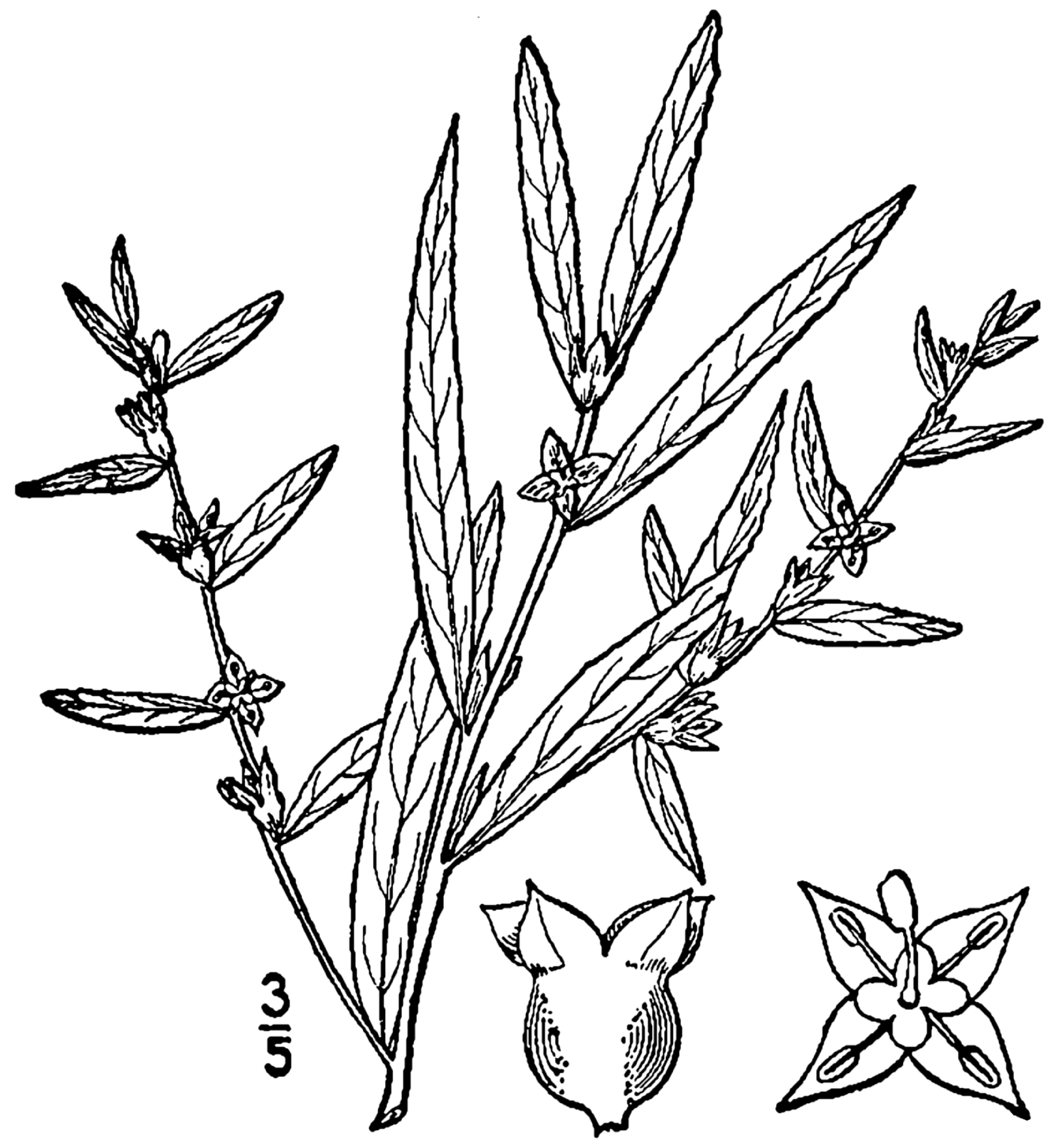
- 1913 illustration

Scientific classification
- Kingdom: Plantae
- Clade: Tracheophytes
- Clade: Angiosperms
- Clade: Eudicots
- Clade: Rosids
- Order: Myrtales
- Family: Onagraceae
- Genus: Ludwigia
- Species: L. sphaerocarpa

Binomial name
- Ludwigia sphaerocarpa Elliott

= Ludwigia sphaerocarpa =

Species of flowering plant

Ludwigia sphaerocarpa, common names globe-fruited false-loosestrife, globefruit primrose-willow, round-fruited false-loosestrife, globe-fruited seedbox, globe-fruited ludwigia, spherical-fruited seedbox and round-fruited false loosestrife; is a plant in the Myrtales family Onagraceae found in North America. It is listed as endangered in Connecticut, Indiana, Massachusetts and Rhode Island, and as threatened in Michigan and New York (state). It is listed as extirpated in Pennsylvania.
