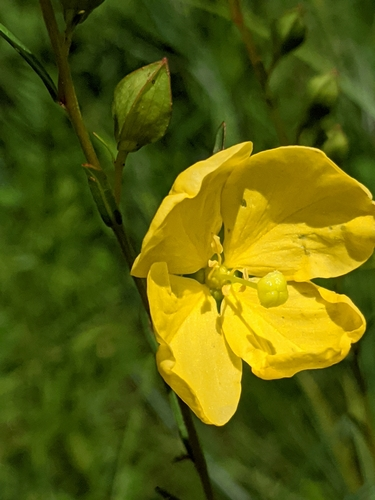

Scientific classification
- Kingdom: Plantae
- Clade: Embryophytes
- Clade: Tracheophytes
- Clade: Spermatophytes
- Clade: Angiosperms
- Clade: Eudicots
- Clade: Rosids
- Order: Myrtales
- Family: Onagraceae
- Genus: Ludwigia
- Species: L. virgata

Binomial name
- Ludwigia virgata Michx. 1803

= Ludwigia virgata =

Species of flowering plant

Ludwigia virgata, also known by the common names savanna primrose-willow and savannah seedbox, is a flowering plant indigenous to the southeastern United States. It is in the family Onagraceae. A perennial, it grows in moist habitats including wet pine savannas and pine flatwoods. The plant generally grows to around 3 ft (0.91 m) tall, with the leaves being around 2.5 in (64 mm) long and 0.5 in (13 mm) wide. Present over the southern half of the Coastal Plain, including the Carolina Sandhills region, ranging north to Dare, Pitt, Johnston, etc. in North Carolina.

It serves as an important larval host for insects like the banded sphinx moth and naturally attracts a variety of local pollinators, including bees and butterflies.
