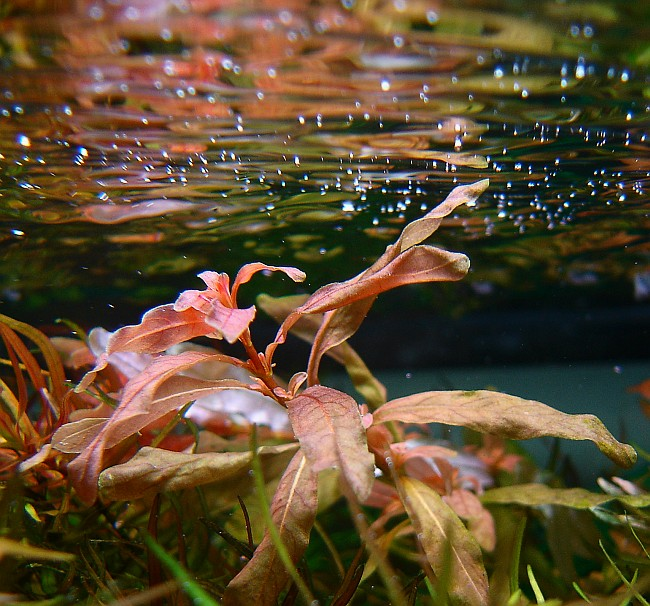

Scientific classification
- Kingdom: Plantae
- Clade: Tracheophytes
- Clade: Angiosperms
- Clade: Eudicots
- Clade: Rosids
- Order: Myrtales
- Family: Onagraceae
- Genus: Ludwigia
- Species: L. inclinata

Binomial name
- Ludwigia inclinata (L.f.) M.Gómez

= Ludwigia inclinata =

Species of aquatic plant

Ludwigia inclinata is a highly variable herb from Central and South America, usually found growing emersed or submersed on the beds of dried ponds or lakes, either submerged or with emergent stems.

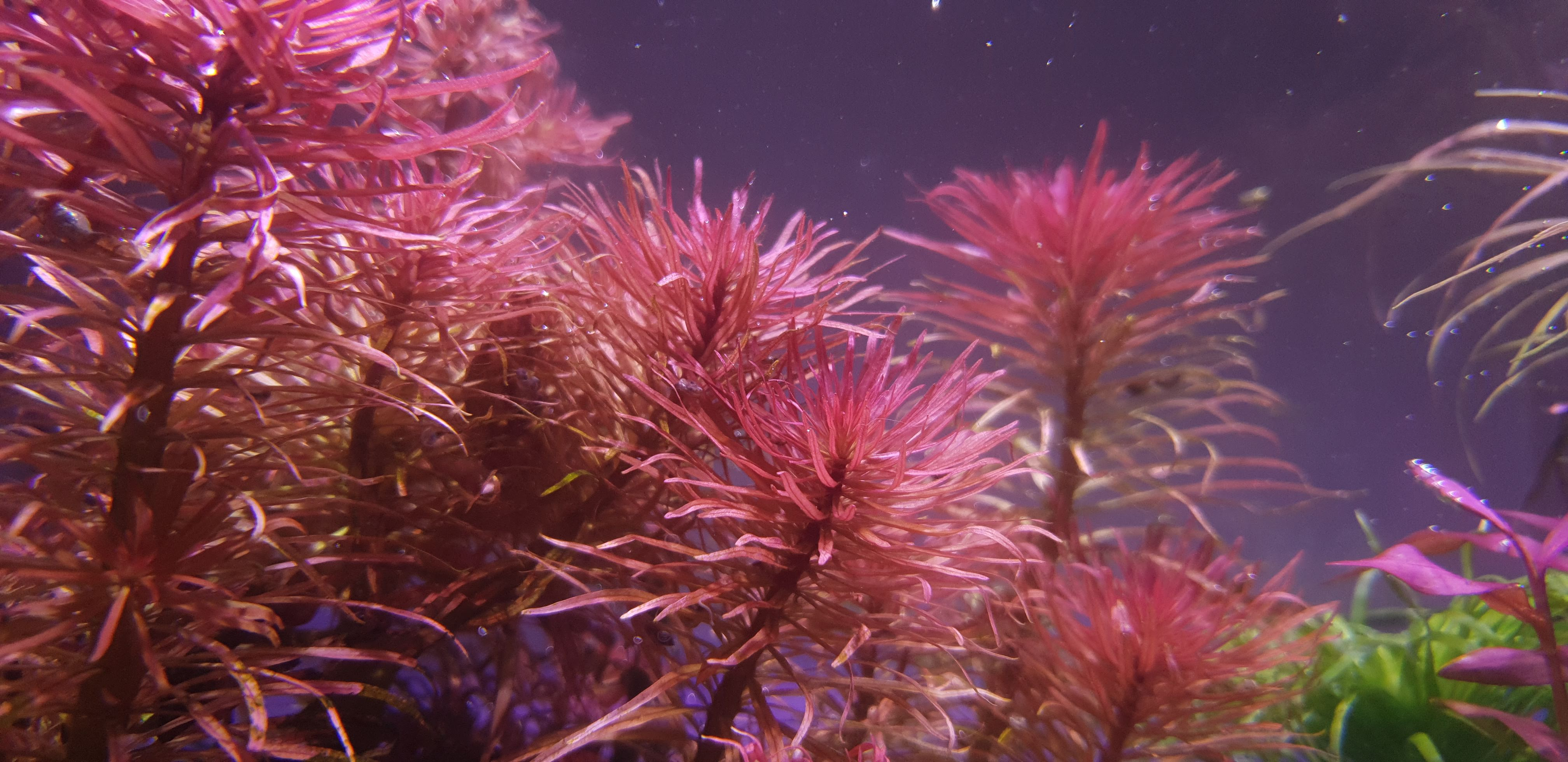
Ludwigia inclinata var. verticillata 'Pantanal'

The verticillate forms, of which several are known, are among the most highly prized aquarium plants in the trade. They include Ludwigia inclinata var. verticillata "Pantanal" and Ludwigia inclinata var. verticillata "Cuba". When grown to its full height, Ludwigia inclinata var. verticillata "Pantanal" is one of the most beautiful stem plants.

== Description ==
Ludwigia inclinata is a fragile plant with leaves that are long, narrow, and very colorful. They transition from green at the base to orange/yellow with deep red on the crown. The yellow and red leaves that a dramatic contrast to the green foliage. They plants have oblong, rounded leaves with a wavy texture that grow in opposite pairs along the length of the stem.

Ludwigia inclinata prefers medium to high light. Consistent dosing of micronutrients will help the plant grow very quickly. High iron content will bring out more red tones in the plant. CO_{2} injection is highly recommended for the cultivation of this plant. The plant can be grown submersed or emersed.

Propagation can be achieved by taking cuttings from the main stem of the plant that are replanted into the substrate.
