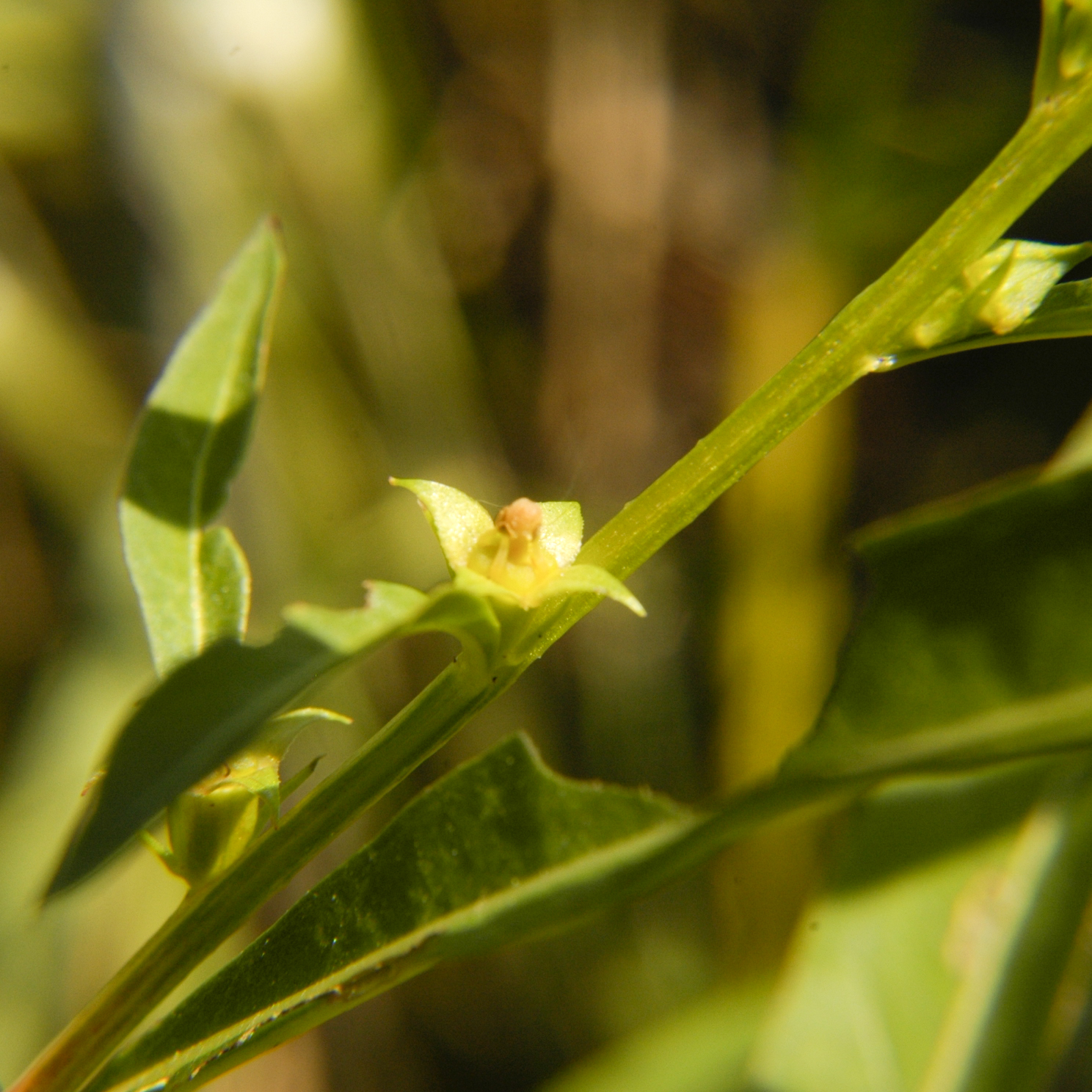

Scientific classification
- Kingdom: Plantae
- Clade: Tracheophytes
- Clade: Angiosperms
- Clade: Eudicots
- Clade: Rosids
- Order: Myrtales
- Family: Onagraceae
- Genus: Ludwigia
- Species: L. polycarpa

Binomial name
- Ludwigia polycarpa Short & Peter

= Ludwigia polycarpa =

Species of flowering plant

Ludwigia polycarpa, common names many-fruited false-loosestrife and false loosestrife seedbox, is a plant found in North America. It is listed as a special concern and believed extirpated in Connecticut, and as endangered in Massachusetts, Pennsylvania and Vermont.
