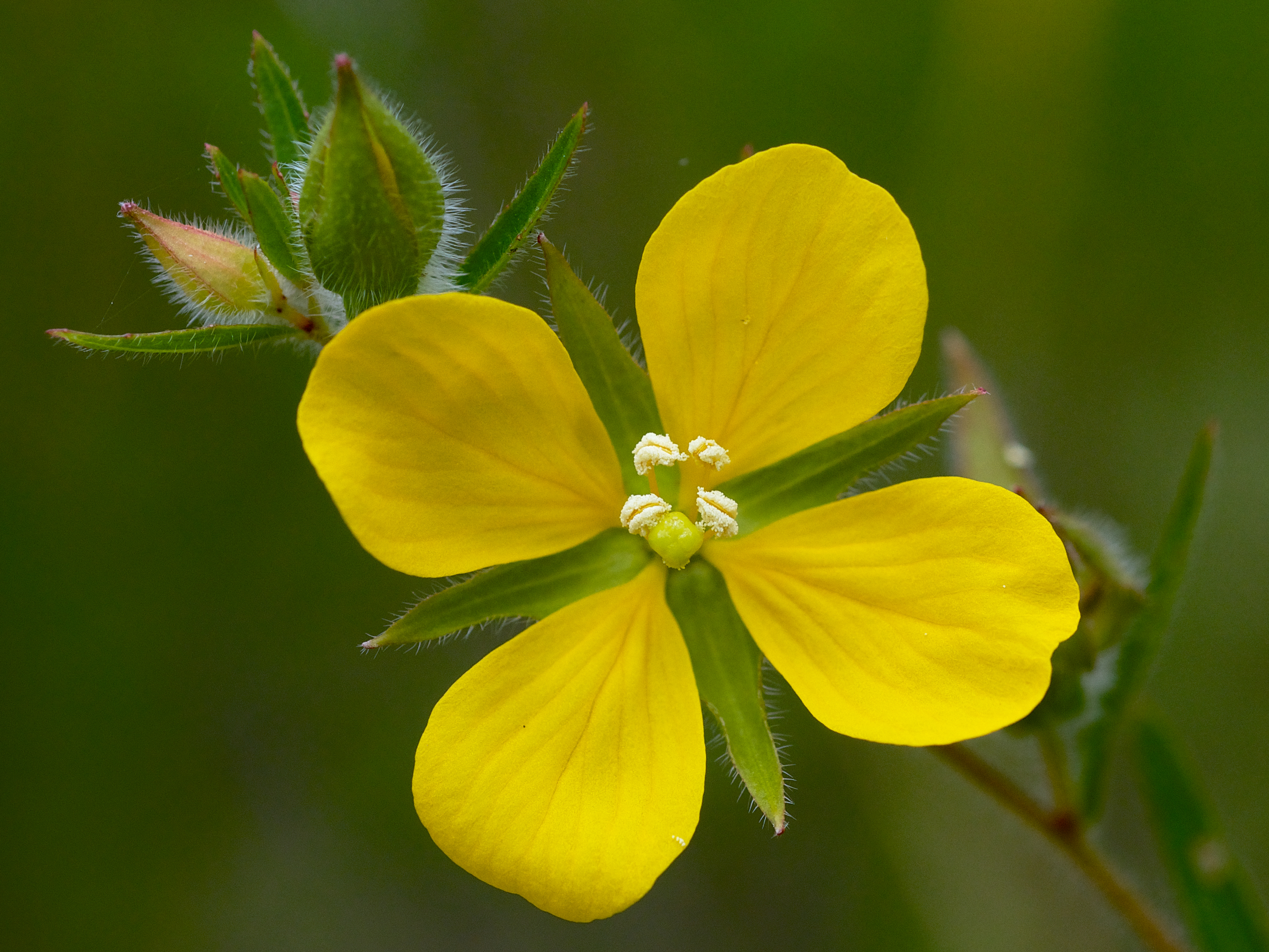

Scientific classification
- Kingdom: Plantae
- Clade: Tracheophytes
- Clade: Angiosperms
- Clade: Eudicots
- Clade: Rosids
- Order: Myrtales
- Family: Onagraceae
- Genus: Ludwigia
- Species: L. hirtella

Binomial name
- Ludwigia hirtella (Raf.)

= Ludwigia hirtella =

Species of plant

Ludwigia hirtella, commonly called spindleroot, is a species of plant in the evening primrose family that is native to the south-central United States of America.

== Description ==
This species is an erect perennial, with alternately arranged leaves that reach a length up to 10 centimeters and a width up to 2.5 centimeters in width. Each flower has four petals that range in length from 7 to 15 millimeters.

== Distribution and habitat ==
L. hirtella's range stretches from New Jersey to Florida and west to Texas.

This species has been observed growing in habitats such as wiregrass-longleaf pinewoods, pine-saw palmetto flatwoods, and wet thickets.
