= Ludwigia pilosa =

Scientific classification
- Kingdom: Plantae
- Clade: Tracheophytes
- Clade: Angiosperms
- Clade: Eudicots
- Clade: Rosids
- Order: Myrtales
- Family: Onagraceae
- Genus: Ludwigia
- Species: L. pilosa

Binomial name
- Ludwigia pilosa Walter

Aquatic plant species

Ludwigia pilosa, the hairy primrose-willow, is a species of plant in the family Onagraceae.

== Description ==
This aquatic plant is perennial and flowers through late June until late November. Ludwigia pilosa is pubescent all over and sometimes described as velvety. The stem can measure up to 1.2 meters tall with alternating leaves. Leaves are simple and attached at the petiole. Leaves are also elliptical shaped, gauging roughly 20 - 100 mm in length and 3-14 mm in width. The flowers are characterized by no petals but having 4-7 yellow sepals averaging 4-5 mm long. Ludwigia pilosa is plentiful in seeds measuring 0.5mm and incapsulated in a dry seed pod. The seed box in cubed shaped with a thick exterior and estimates 3-4 mm in length. Ludwigia pilosa has proven to be a very resourceful plant. Waterfowl feed on the seeds of the hairy primrose-willow and the immersed portion creates habitat for many invertebrates. Once the plants start to decay, the detritus then sustains the invertebrates also.

== Habitat and distribution ==
Ludwigia pilosa prefers wet ground and can be found along road side ditches, ponds, and shallow swampy areas. Distribution spreads from eastern TX to the southern half of MS, AL, GA, NC, SC, the northern portion of FL, and two counties in southeastern VA.
