= Ludwigia anastomosans =

Conservation status
- Vulnerable (IUCN 2.3)

Scientific classification
- Kingdom: Plantae
- Clade: Tracheophytes
- Clade: Angiosperms
- Clade: Eudicots
- Clade: Rosids
- Order: Myrtales
- Family: Onagraceae
- Genus: Ludwigia
- Species: L. anastomosans

Binomial name
- Ludwigia anastomosans (DC.) Hara

Species of flowering plant

Ludwigia anastomosans is a species of plant in the family Onagraceae. It is endemic to Brazil.
