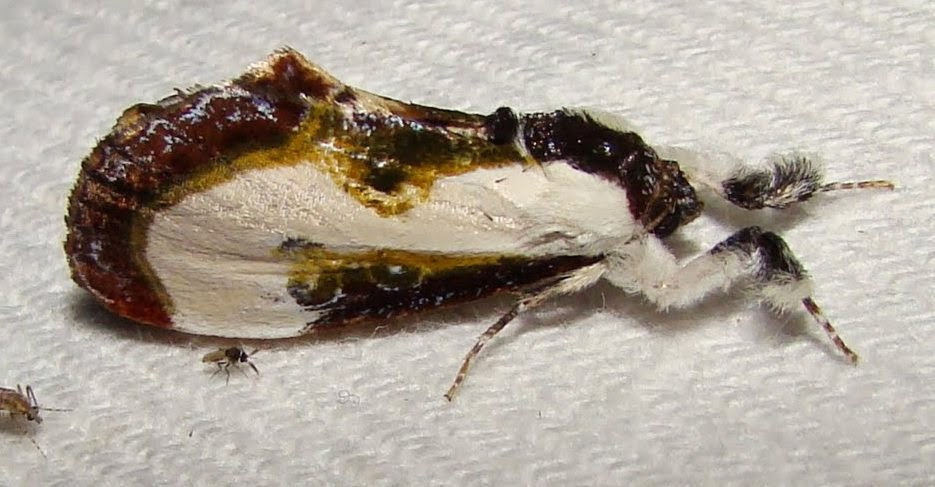

Scientific classification
- Domain: Eukaryota
- Kingdom: Animalia
- Phylum: Arthropoda
- Class: Insecta
- Order: Lepidoptera
- Superfamily: Noctuoidea
- Family: Noctuidae
- Genus: Eudryas
- Species: E. grata

Binomial name
- Eudryas grata Fabricius, 1793

= Eudryas grata =

Species of moth

Eudryas grata is a moth known as the beautiful wood nymph. They are known for their mimicry of bird droppings. This species is found predominantly across the entire eastern United States. Hosts for the caterpillar include Ampelopsis, buttonbush, grapes, hops, and Virginia creeper.

== Gallery ==
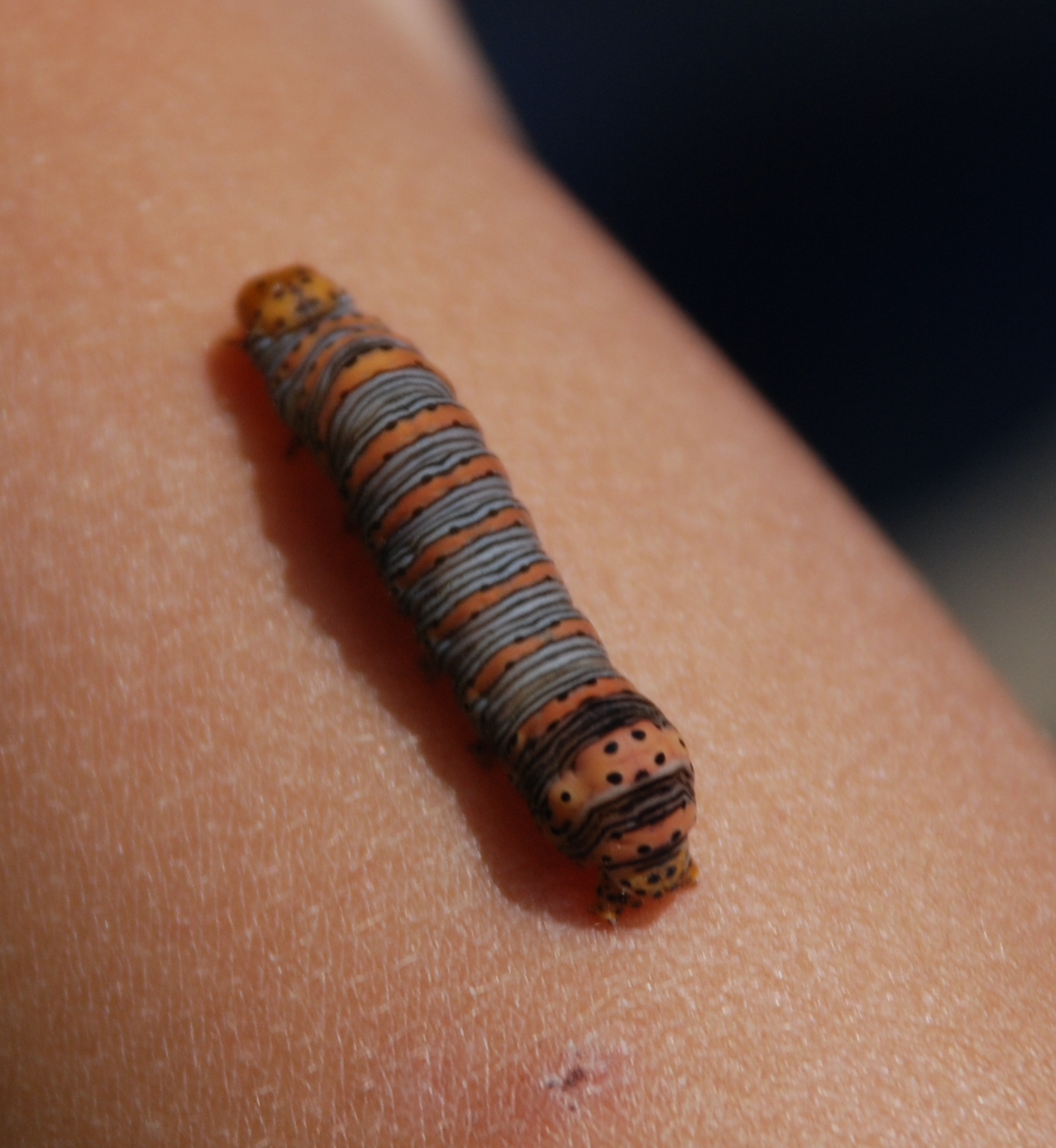
Larvae or caterpillar of Eudryas grata.

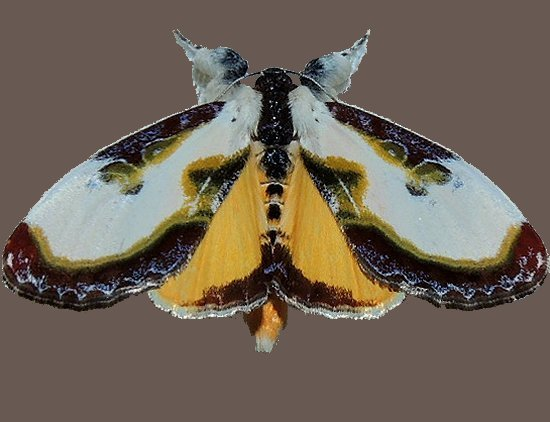
Eudryas grata adult

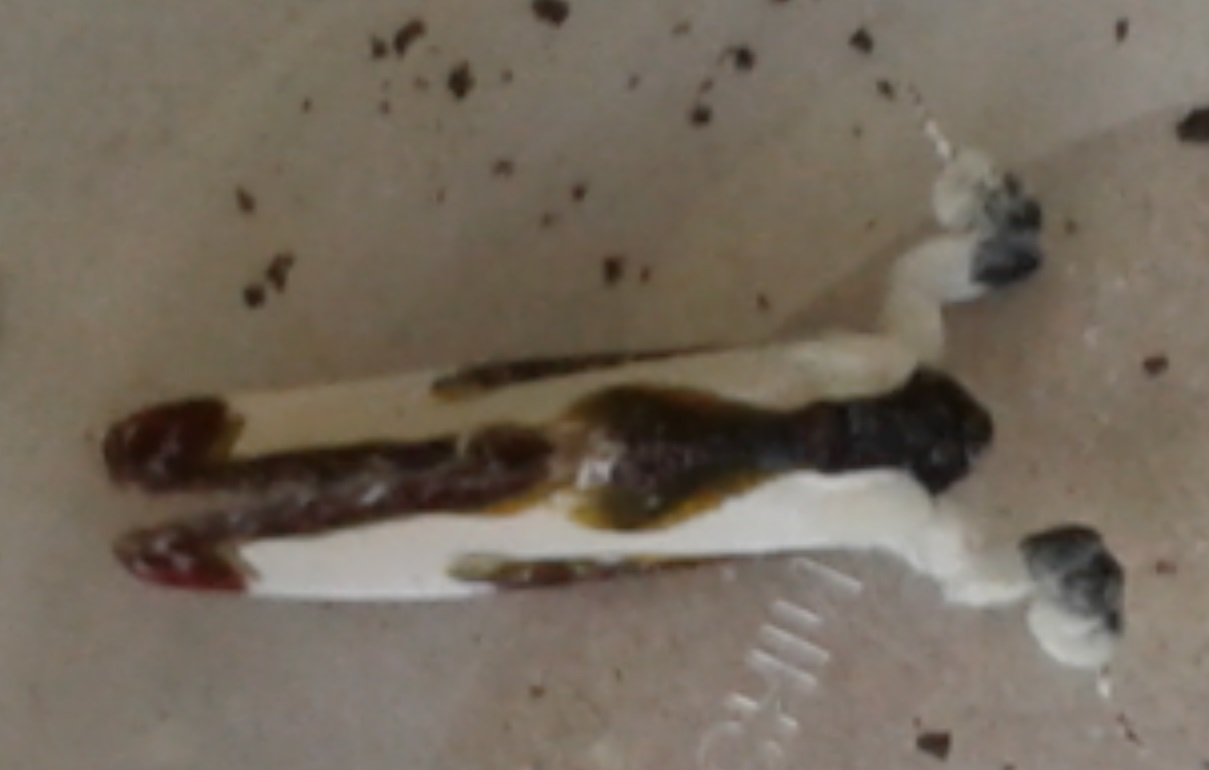
Eudryas grata at rest, shown from above

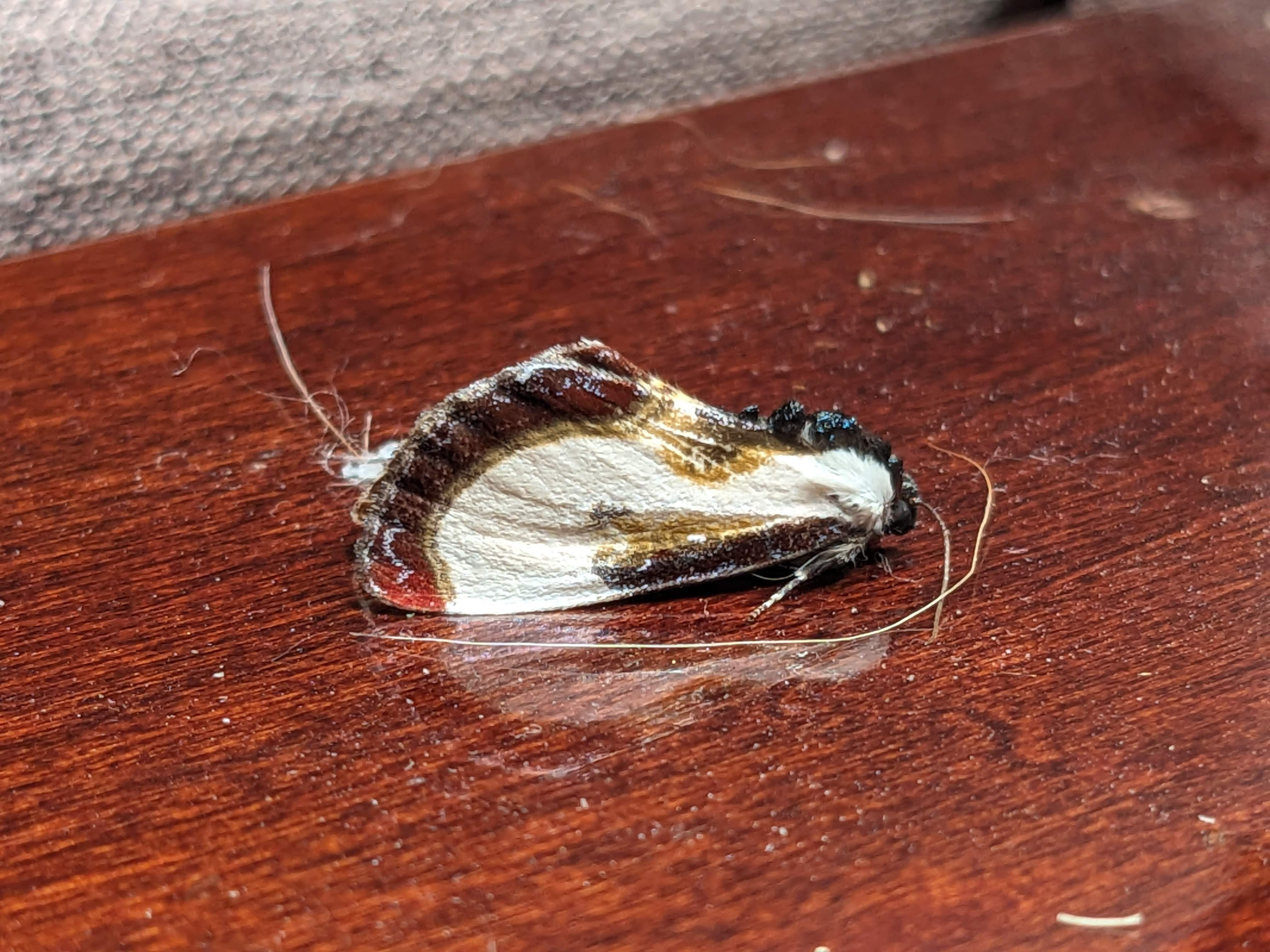
Eudryas grata in August in NY
