= Ludwigia alata =

Scientific classification
- Kingdom: Plantae
- Clade: Tracheophytes
- Clade: Angiosperms
- Clade: Eudicots
- Clade: Rosids
- Order: Myrtales
- Family: Onagraceae
- Genus: Ludwigia
- Species: L. alata

Binomial name
- Ludwigia alata Elliott

Species of plant

Ludwigia alata is a species of plant in the family Onagraceae. It is native to Southeastern United States and has been introduced to Jamaica.

== Habitat ==
Ludwigia alata lives in freshwater to oligohaline tidal marshes.
