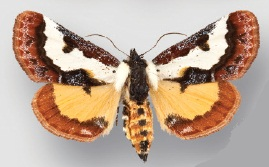
- Eudryas brevipennis

Scientific classification
- Kingdom: Animalia
- Phylum: Arthropoda
- Class: Insecta
- Order: Lepidoptera
- Superfamily: Noctuoidea
- Family: Noctuidae
- Subfamily: Agaristinae
- Genus: Eudryas; Boisduval in Boisduval & Guenée, 1836

Species
- See text

Synonyms
- Cyphocampa Harris, 1869; Parathisanotia Kiriakoff, 1977

= Eudryas =

Genus of moths

Eudryas is a genus of moths of the family Noctuidae.

== Species ==
The genus includes the following species:

- Eudryas brevipennis Stretch, 1872
- Eudryas grata – beautiful wood nymph Fabricius, 1793
- Eudryas unio – pearly wood nymph Hübner, [1831]
