= The Nymphs (poem) =

1818 poem by Leigh Hunt

The Nymphs was composed by Leigh Hunt and published in Foliage, his 1818 collection of poems. The work describes the spirits of a rural landscape that are connected to Greek mythology. The images serve to discuss aspects of British life along with promoting the freedom of conscience for the British people. The collection as a whole received many attacks by contemporary critics, but later commentators viewed the poem favourably.

== Background ==
During the end of 1816, Hunt began to put together his ideas for a poem that would become The Nymphs. While working on the poem in 1817, Hunt was staying at the Albion House in Marlow and spent much of his time in the garden or walking through the countryside. During this time, he heard stories of Francis Dashwood and his Hell-Fire Club, which its members spent their time drinking and pursuing women. The poem was included in Hunt's collection of poems called Foliage, which was published in early 1818. The Nymphs was the first poem in the book. When Hunt republished The Nymphs in his collected works, he did not republish portions of the poem possibly because of the themes not matching those found in his other works.

== Poem ==
The poem begins with a discussion on health and philosophy:

the motes of Bigotry's sick eye,
Or the blind feel of false Philosophy

The poem describes the nymphs that were part of the landscape:

Those are the Naiads, who keep neat
The banks from sedge, and from the dull-dropp'd feet
Of cattle that break down the fibrous mould.
They snap the selfish nets, that, overbold
Cross the whole river, and might trip the keels
Of summer boats.

The poem ends with a command that the reader should spread the message of the poem:

Go tell our song
To such as hang their pale home-withered heads
For winter-time, and do our kindness wrong:
And say, that they might bear,
The more they know us, the moist weight of air

== Themes ==
Although supposedly located in Thessaly, the description used in the poem is based on the landscape surrounding Marlow and the Thames river valley. In addition to the landscape, elements of the Hell-Fire Club enter into the poem. These British based subjects are combined with Greek mythology along with creatures that Hunt made up on his own. All of the creatures are related to Pan and natural religion that was based in liberty. In doing so, the poem discusses British society and how to fix the problems in the world. In particular, Hunt attacked the established Anglican faith and problems related to the religion. While working on the poem, Hunt defended John Wright against claims that the Unitarian minister was promoting blasphemy. The poem serves to defend the freedom of conscience while attacking the intolerant people. The work as a whole was a parallel to John Keats's Endymion written at the same time, and both Keats and Hunt were influenced in their understanding of paganism by Samuel Taylor Coleridge's Wallenstein.

== Critical response ==
The poem, along with the collection Foliage, was attacked by critics. In particular, the Literary Gazette claimed that the work fell short of the sublime aspects that were part of what they labelled "true poetry". In the only review that was accepting of the collection, the Eclectic Review claimed that the poem described the "demonology of Paganism" as a possible reality. However, Percy Bysshe Shelley, Hunt's friend and fellow poet, claimed that the work was "truly poetical, in the intense and emphatic sense of the word."

In 1930, Edmund Blunden stated that the poem was "finer than any of Hunt's previous poetry, and though free and easy in form yet sustained by a strong philosophical design. Ann Blainey, in 1985, argued that the poem "may well be one of Hunt's best poems [...] The poem has a sensitive joy in nature which owed much to Shelley's vigorous poetical and sexual outlook, and a sensuousness more open and genuine than Hunt would ever express again."
