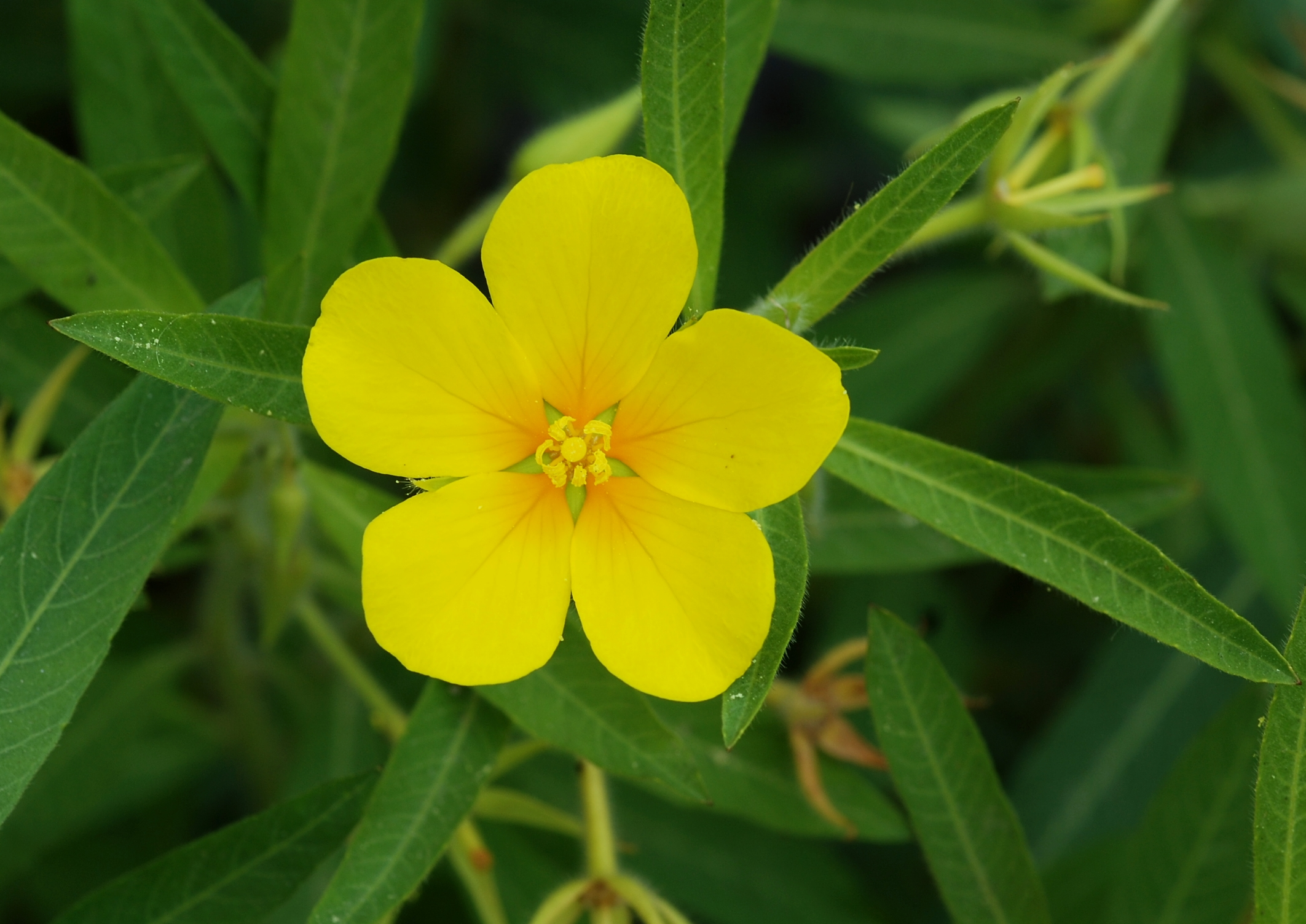
- Ludwigia hexapetala

Scientific classification
- Kingdom: Plantae
- Clade: Tracheophytes
- Clade: Angiosperms
- Clade: Eudicots
- Clade: Rosids
- Order: Myrtales
- Family: Onagraceae
- Genus: Ludwigia
- Species: L. hexapetala

Binomial name
- Ludwigia hexapetala Hook.

= Ludwigia hexapetala =

Water primrose

Species of flowering plant in the willowherb family

Ludwigia hexapetala, the water primrose, is a herbaceous perennial plant of the family Onagraceae. Native to Central and South America, its habitat includes the margins of lakes, ponds, ditches, and streams. Its stems may be immersed or fully emergent. It is a noxious invader of aquatic ecosystems in North America.

== Habitat ==
Ludwigia hexapetala is native to Latin America. It occurs naturally in swampier regions, such as those of lakes, ponds, and other areas of low intensity/stagnant water. It grows in mats of up to three feet tall, and in doing so, it crowds and/or shades out the other, more native species. This species is invasive in the Southeast United States, Midwest United States, Pacific Coast, and parts of New England.

== External resources ==
- http://www.ecy.wa.gov/programs/wq/plants/plantid2/descriptions/ludhex.html
- https://web.archive.org/web/20050814081017/http://www.nwcb.wa.gov/weed_info/Written_findings/Ludwigia_hexapetala.html
- http://www.patentlens.net/daisy/AgroTran/g8/821.html
- https://web.archive.org/web/20130603161101/http://www.fairchildgarden.org/uploads/docs/Education/Downloadable_teaching_modules/plant%20kingdom/monocot%20and%20dicot%20characteristics%20handout.pdf
