= Nympha =

Nympha may refer to:

- another term for a chrysalis
- the labia minora (often in plural, nymphae)
- Nympha (Ninfa), a 5th-century virgin Christian martyr from Palermo
- Nympha of Laodicea (fl. mid-1st century CE), early Christian leader noted in the New Testament for hosting a house church
- Nympha, a 1971 Filipino erotic drama film directed by Celso Ad. Castillo
  - Nympha, a 2003 remake also directed by Castillo
- Elha Nympha (born 2004), Filipina singer

== See also ==
- Nymph (disambiguation)
