= HMS Nymphe =

Seven ships of the Royal Navy have been named HMS Nymphe, HMS Nymph or HMS Nymphen after the Nymphs of Greek Mythology. Another was planned but never completed:

- HMS Nymph was a 14-gun sloop launched in 1778 and burnt by accident in 1783.
- HMS Nymphe (1780) was a 36-gun fifth rate captured from the French in 1780 and wrecked in 1810.
- HMS Nymphen (1807) was a 36-gun fifth rate captured from the Danes in 1807. She was to have been renamed HMS Determinee, but this did not happen; she was sold in 1816.
- HMS Nymphe (1812) was a 38-gun fifth rate, built as HMS Neriede but renamed in 1811 and launched in 1812. She was placed on harbour service from 1836, renamed HMS Handy in 1871, and was broken up in 1875.
- HMS Nymphe (1866) was a wooden screw sloop launched in 1866 and sold in 1884.
- HMS Nymphe (1888) was a composite screw sloop launched in 1888. She became a base ship and was renamed HMS Wildfire in 1906, and HMS Gannet in 1916 and finally HMS Pembroke in 1917. She was sold in 1920.
- HMS Nymphe (1911) was an Acorn-class destroyer launched in 1911 and sold in 1921.
- HMS Nymphe was to have been a modified Black Swan-class sloop laid down in 1945 but cancelled later that year.

== See also ==
- French ship Nymphe
