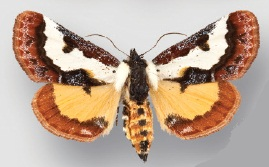
- Eudryas brevipennis brevipennis, male
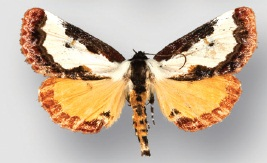
- Eudryas brevipennis bonneville, male

Scientific classification
- Kingdom: Animalia
- Phylum: Arthropoda
- Class: Insecta
- Order: Lepidoptera
- Superfamily: Noctuoidea
- Family: Noctuidae
- Genus: Eudryas
- Species: E. brevipennis

Binomial name
- Eudryas brevipennis Stretch, 1872

= Eudryas brevipennis =

Species of moth

Eudryas brevipennis is a moth in the family Noctuidae. It is found in Idaho, Utah and California, generally near wetland habitats.

Adults are on wing in spring and summer. Forewings are white with dark brown markings and reddish brown margins, and hindwings are yellow with brown margins. Females' forewings reach 16–17 millimetres (0.63–0.67 in), and males' forewings reach 15–16 millimetres (0.59–0.63 in).

The larvae feed on Oenothera and Epilobium species.

== Subspecies ==
- Eudryas brevipennis brevipennis
  - This subspecies is found in California near Los Angeles, the Central Valley, and the San Francisco Bay Area
- Eudryas brevipennis bonneville Shepard & Crabo, 2013
  - This subspecies is found in the Lake Bonneville basin in the northern Intermountain Region of North America, especially along Snake River in Idaho.
