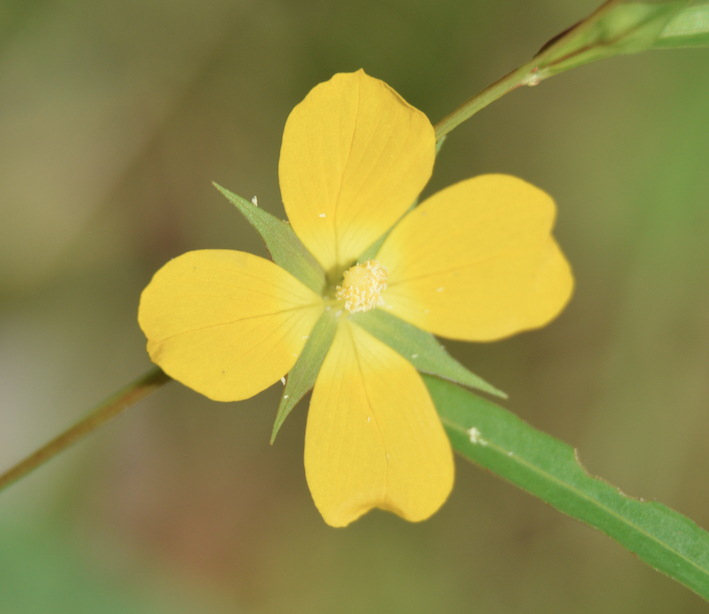
- Flowers have four to five yellow petals.
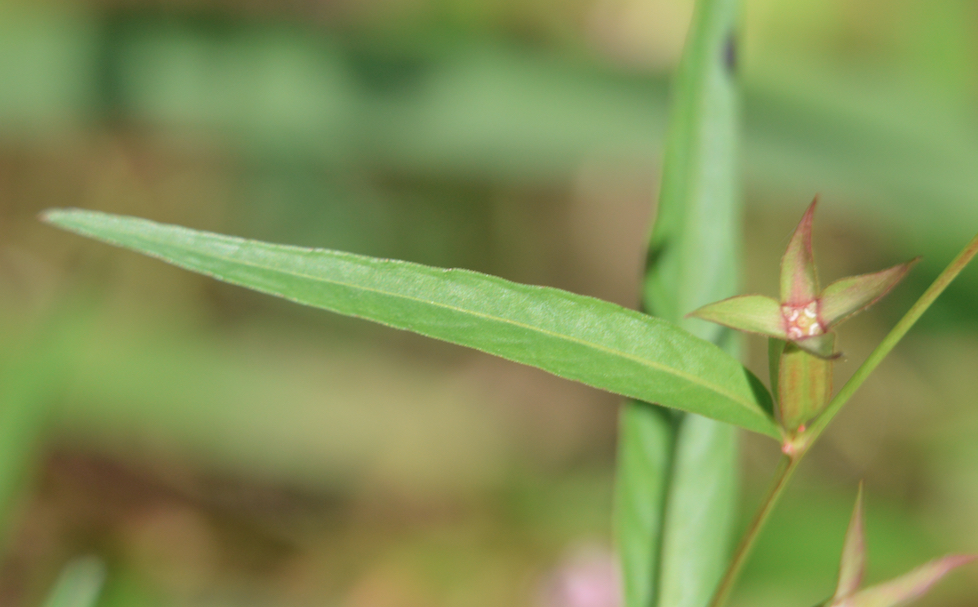
- Alternately arranged linear leaves.

Conservation status
- Secure (NatureServe)

Scientific classification
- Kingdom: Plantae
- Clade: Tracheophytes
- Clade: Angiosperms
- Clade: Eudicots
- Clade: Rosids
- Order: Myrtales
- Family: Onagraceae
- Genus: Ludwigia
- Species: L. decurrens

Binomial name
- Ludwigia decurrens Walter

= Ludwigia decurrens =

Species of flowering plant

Ludwigia decurrens is a species of flowering plant in the evening primrose family known by the common names willow primrose and wingleaf primrose-willow. It is native to the central and eastern United States.

This species is an annual herb that reaches up to 6 feet (1.8 m) tall, sometimes growing as a perennial by virtue of its partially woody stem. It has an erect form and a winged stem that is angled. The plant is glabrous. The linear leaves are alternately arranged. The sessile leaves are decurrent: they extend down along the stem at their bases. The flower has four yellow petals. The seed capsules may contain up to 1000 seeds per capsule.

This plant grows in wet habitat types, often alongside Polygonum and Cyperus species.

L. decurrens has become an invasive species in Africa and in Southeast Asia, where it frequently colonizes rice paddies and other wetlands. Invasion in anaerobic habitats is facilitated by the aerenchyma that enable willow primrose rhizomes to float and by its capacity to spread either by seed or by vegetative propagation from broken plant fragments. Exudates from this species have been shown to have allelopathic effects on Corchorus olitorius by increasing mortality of seedlings.
