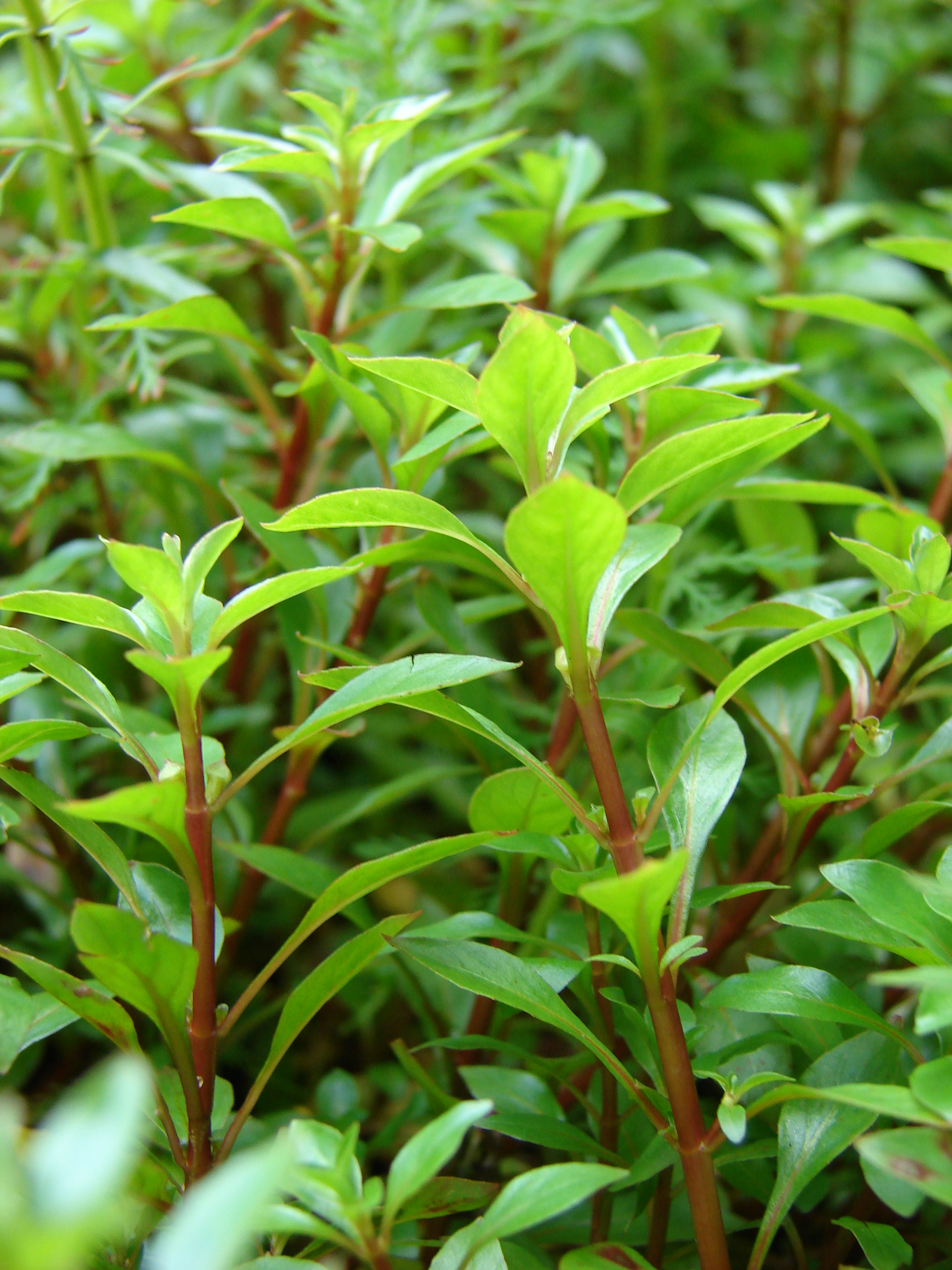

Conservation status
- Least Concern (IUCN 3.1)

- Secure (NatureServe)

Scientific classification
- Kingdom: Plantae
- Clade: Embryophytes
- Clade: Tracheophytes
- Clade: Spermatophytes
- Clade: Angiosperms
- Clade: Eudicots
- Clade: Rosids
- Order: Myrtales
- Family: Onagraceae
- Genus: Ludwigia
- Species: L. palustris

Binomial name
- Ludwigia palustris (L.) Elliott

= Ludwigia palustris =

Species of plant

Ludwigia palustris is a species of flowering plant in the evening primrose family known by the common names marsh seedbox, Hampshire-purslane and water purslane. This is an aquatic or semiaquatic perennial herb which grows in moist to wet to flooded areas. It is sometimes a weed. The species epithet palustris is Latin for "of the marsh" and indicates its common habitat.

== Description ==
L. palustris forms prostrate, sprawling mats in wet, disturbed areas. Its stems are semi-succulent, reddish in color, and smooth or slightly hairy. As the stems spread along the ground, roots form from the nodes. At maturity, the stems may reach 10-40 cm long.

The leaves are opposite, smooth, oval-shaped, and reach up to 4 cm long. They have a winged petiole and are often reddish-green in color.

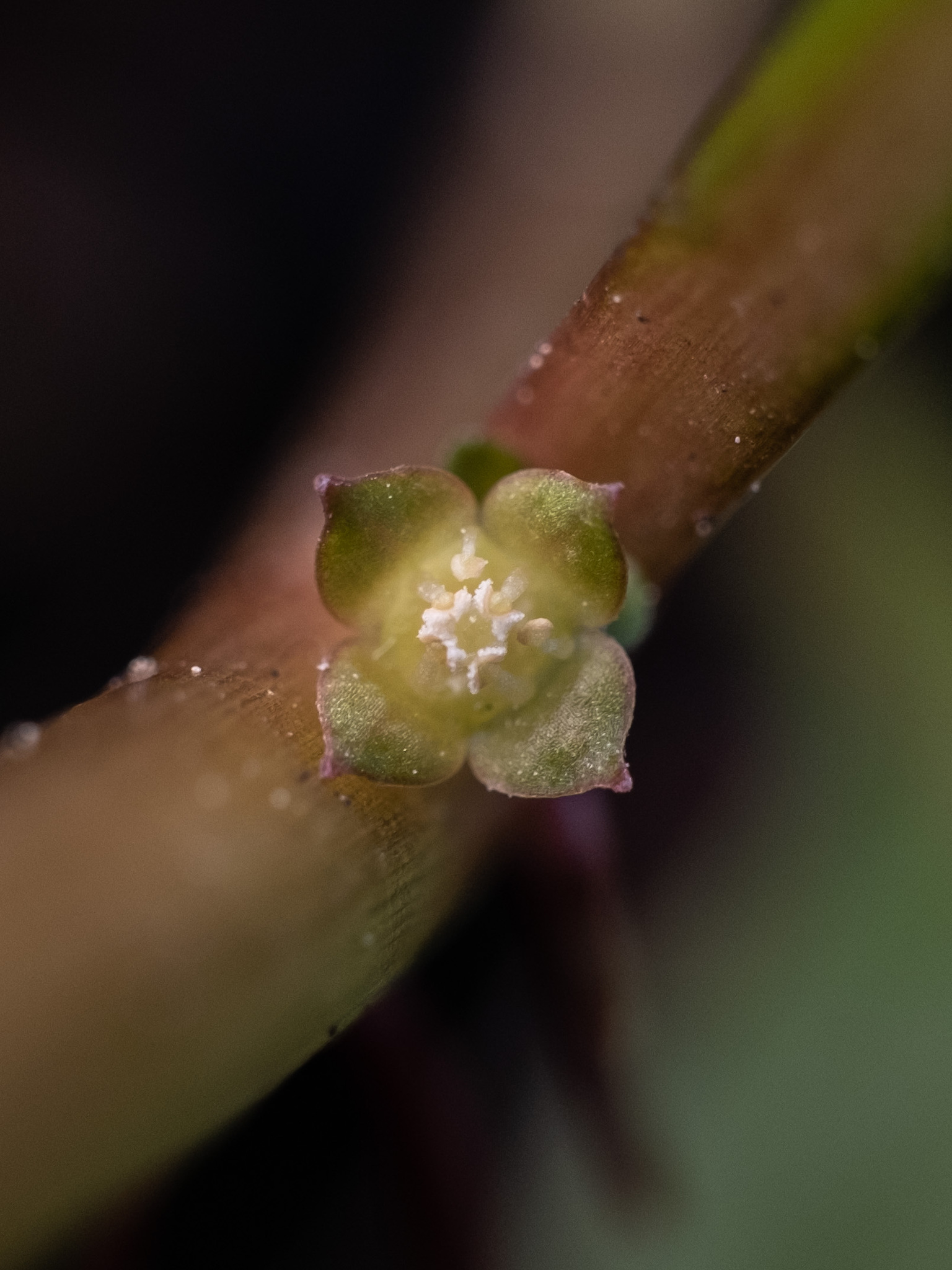
Flowers with visible stamens

The greenish-white flowers are born on the leaf axils and reach 2-3 cm long. They lack petals, and are composed of 4 triangular-shaped sepals and 4 white-tipped stamens, set above a cube-shaped, 4-angled ovary.

The fruits are small, cube-shaped capsules, 2-3 cm long. They are pale green in color, with darker green stripes along the angles. The sepals are persistent, remaining present on the developed fruits.

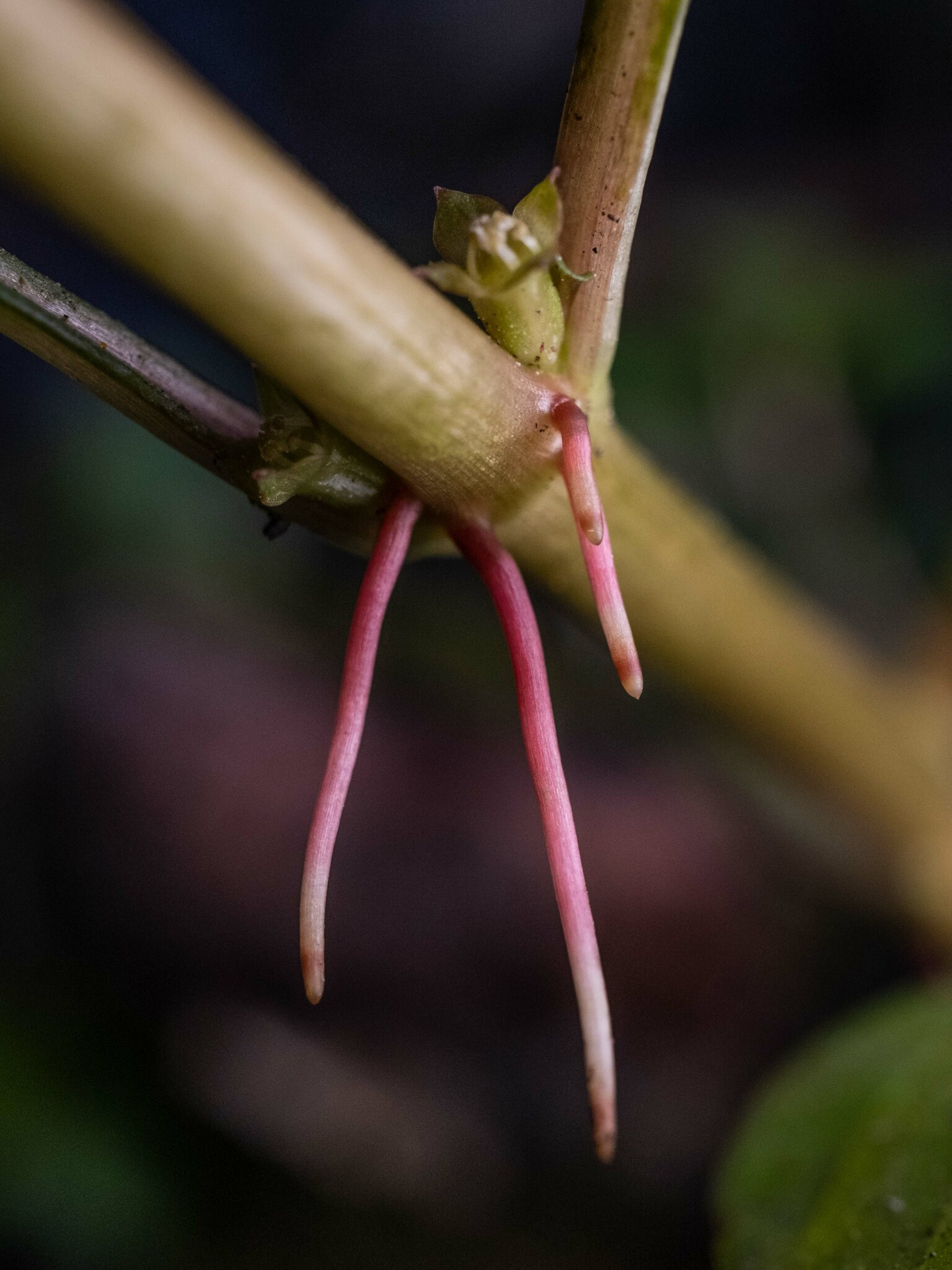
Roots extending from the nodes of the stem, with axillary flowers visible

== Taxonomy ==
Ludwigia palustris was given the scientific name Isnardia palustris in 1753 by Carl Linnaeus. It was moved to the genus Ludwigia by Stephen Elliott in 1817. Together with its genus it is classified in the family Onagraceae. Though it has not accepted varieties, there are five variety names among its 21 synonyms.

Table of Synonyms
Name	Year	Rank	Notes
Dantia palustris (L.) Des Moul.	1859	species	≡ hom.
Isnardia ascendens Hall ex Eaton & Wright	1840	species	= het.
Isnardia nitida Poir.	1813	species	= het.
Isnardia palustris L.	1753	species	≡ hom.
Isnardia palustris var. americana DC.	1828	variety	= het.
Isnardia palustris var. riparia Boenn.	1824	variety	= het.
Isnardia palustris var. rivularis Boenn.	1824	variety	= het.
Isnardia palustris f. submersa Glück	1911	form	= het.
Jussiaea isnardia E.H.L.Krause	1901	species	= het.
Ludwigia apetala Walter	1788	species	= het.
Ludwigia nitida Michx.	1803	species	= het.
Ludwigia palustris var. americana (DC.) Fernald & Griscom	1935	variety	= het.
Ludwigia palustris f. elongata Fassett	1939	form	= het.
Ludwigia palustris var. inundata Svenson	1935	variety	= het.
Ludwigia palustris var. liebmannii H.Lév.	1912	variety	= het.
Ludwigia palustris var. nana Fernald & Griscom	1935	variety	= het.
Ludwigia palustris var. pacifica Fernald & Griscom	1935	variety	= het.
Ludwigia palustris f. submersa Eames	1933	form	= het.
Ludwigia palustris var. typica Fernald & Griscom	1935	variety	≡ hom., not validly publ.
Peplis portula Schrank	1818	species	= het., nom. nud.
Quadricosta palustris (L.) Dulac	1867	species	≡ hom.
Notes: ≡ homotypic synonym; = heterotypic synonym

== Distribution and habitat ==
L. palustris is circumpolar species with a large native range. It occurs in North America, South America, Africa, Asia, and Europe. It occurs as a naturalized or invasive species in Hawaii, Australia, and New Zealand.

The species is generally restricted to low elevations, where it grows on shallow bodies of water such as reservoirs, ditches, and the banks of ponds, rivers, and streams. It requires wet, muddy or sandy soils poor in calcium but rich in humus and nutrients.

== Conservation status ==
L. palustris is designated by the IUCN Red List and NatureServe as a secure (G5) species globally. In North America, it is also designated as secure (N5) in both Canada and the United States. In some states and provinces, it is designated to be at higher risk. In both Arizona and Prince Edward Island, it is ranked as a critically imperiled (S1) species. In New Mexico it is imperiled (S2). In Kansas, Iowa, and Quebec it is vulnerable (S3).

The plant can be highly invasive outside its native range, very adaptable, and reproduces asexually. Ludwigia palustris poses a potential threat to wetland vegetation in Victoria, Australia. It has spread to riverbanks in Northeastern Australia and other areas.

== Cultivation ==
L. palustris is cultivated for use in aquariums and aquascaping. It is often sold under the names Ludwigia 'super red', Ludwigia 'mini super red', or Ludwigia 'red'.

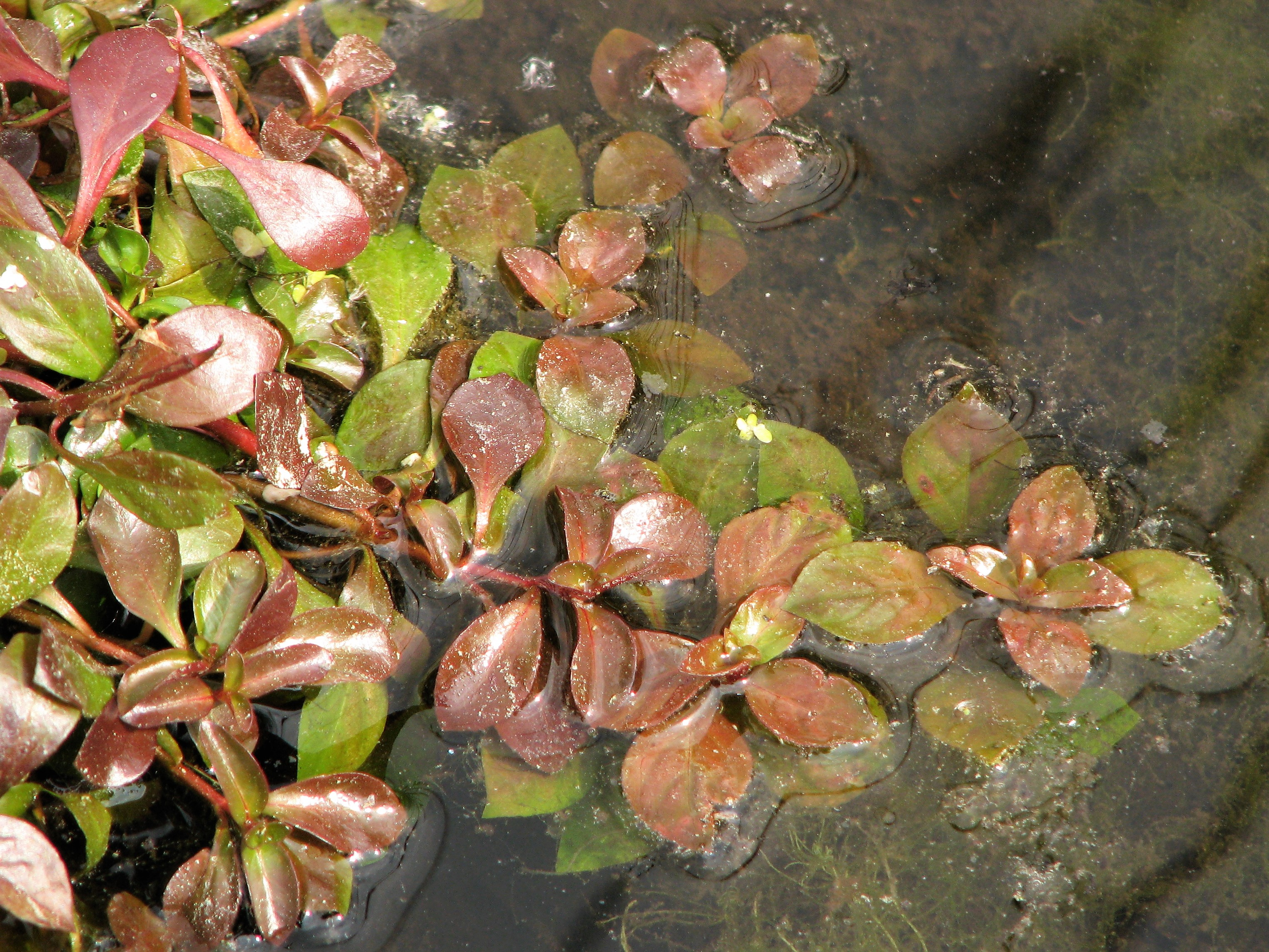
A cultivated specimen growing semi-aquatically
