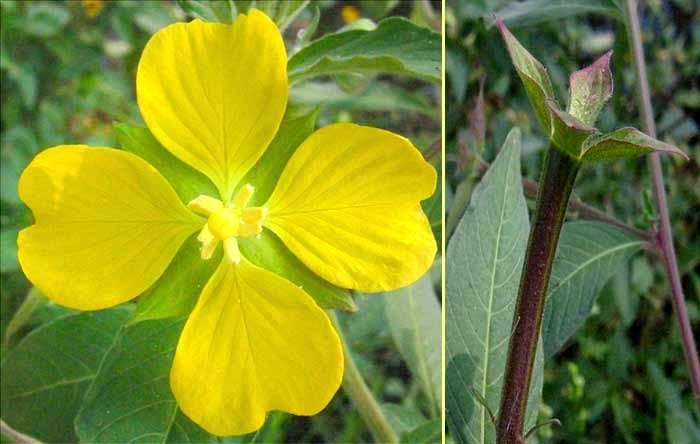

Scientific classification
- Kingdom: Plantae
- Clade: Embryophytes
- Clade: Tracheophytes
- Clade: Spermatophytes
- Clade: Angiosperms
- Clade: Eudicots
- Clade: Rosids
- Order: Myrtales
- Family: Onagraceae
- Subfamily: Ludwigioideae
- Genus: Ludwigia; L.

Species
- See text

= Ludwigia (plant) =

Ludwigia Temporal range: Eocene–Recent

Genus of flowering plants

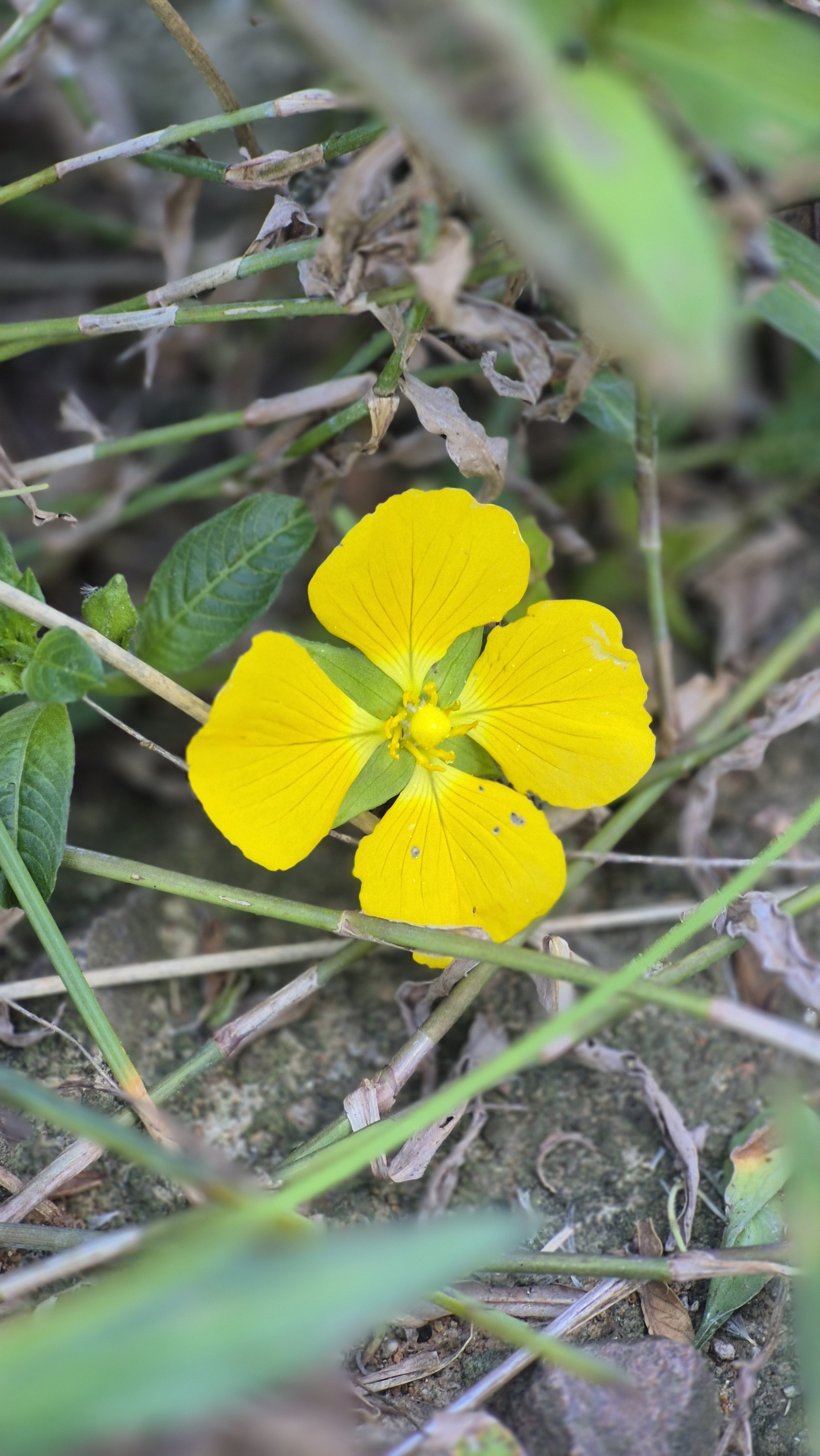
Ludwigia sp.

Ludwigia (primrose-willow, water-purslane, or water-primrose) is a genus of about 82 species of aquatic plants with a cosmopolitan but mainly tropical distribution.

Currently (2023), there is much debate among botanists and plant taxonomists as to the classification of many Ludwigia species. Botanists from the US Department of Agriculture are currently doing genetic analyses on plants from the Western US and South America to better classify members of this genus.

The genus was named by Carl Linnaeus after Christian Gottlieb Ludwig (1709-1773).

== Fossil record ==
The oldest known remains of the genus are known from Eckfelder maar in Germany, dating to the Eocene. Ludwigia pollen was also found associated with beetles belonging to the families Buprestidae and Scarabaeidae, suggesting that these flowers were likely pollinated by beetles rather than hymenopterans as is typical in modern species. A large number of fossil seeds of †Ludwigia collinsoniae and †L. corneri have been described from middle Miocene strata of the Fasterholt area near Silkeborg in Central Jutland, Denmark.

== Selected species ==
Listed from the NCBI database:

- Ludwigia adscendens
- Ludwigia alata
- Ludwigia alternifolia
- Ludwigia anastomosans
- Ludwigia arcuata
- Ludwigia bonariensis
- Ludwigia brevipes
- Ludwigia curtissii
- Ludwigia decurrens
- Ludwigia epilobioides
- Ludwigia erecta
- Ludwigia glandulosa
- Ludwigia grandiflora
- Ludwigia helminthorrhiza
- Ludwigia hirtella
- Ludwigia hexapetala
- Ludwigia hyssopifolia
- Ludwigia inclinata
- Ludwigia lanceolata
- Ludwigia leptocarpa
- Ludwigia linearis
- Ludwigia linifolia
- Ludwigia longifolia
- Ludwigia maritima
- Ludwigia microcarpa
- Ludwigia natans
- Ludwigia octovalvis
- Ludwigia palustris
- Ludwigia peploides
- Ludwigia peruviana
- Ludwigia pilosa
- Ludwigia polycarpa
- Ludwigia ravenii
- Ludwigia repens
- Ludwigia sedioides
- Ludwigia simpsonii
- Ludwigia spathulata
- Ludwigia sphaerocarpa
- Ludwigia suffruticosa
- Ludwigia virgata
