= French ship Nymphe =

Ten ships of the French Navy have borne the name Nymphe:

== Ships named Nymphe ==
- Nymphe (1692), a barque
- Nymphe (1702), a 24-gun frigate
- Gracieuse (1703), a 26-gun frigate, bore the name Nymphe during her career
- Nymphe (1728), a 14-gun corvette
- Nymphe (1752), a 24-gun frigate
- Nymphe (1777), a 32-gun frigate
- Nymphe (1782), a 40-gun frigate, lead ship of her class
- Vistule (1805), a 44-gun Hortense-class frigate
- Nymphe (1810), a 40-gun Ariane-class frigate
- Nymphe (1926), a Sirène-class submarine

== Ships with similar names ==
- Nymphe II, the ex-German minesweeper M42, built in 1916 and recommissioned by the French Navy.

== See also ==
- HMS Nymphe
