= Ninfa Huarachi =

Bolivian politician (born 1955)

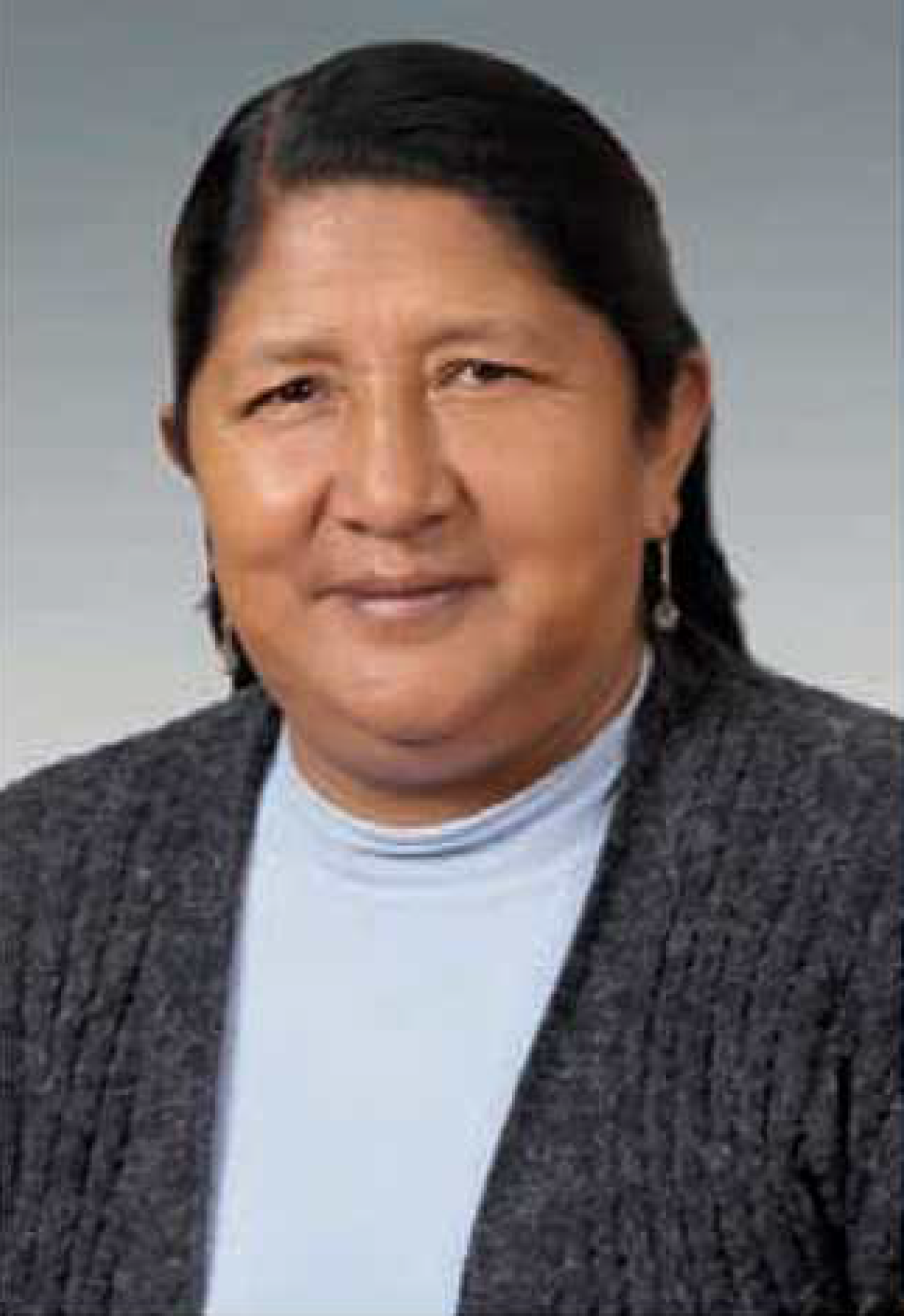
- Official portrait, 2014

Member of the Chamber of Deputies from Tarija
- In office 19 January 2010 – 18 January 2015
- Substitute: Carlos Borda
- Preceded by: Simón Zurita
- Succeeded by: Nora Quisbert
- Constituency: Party list

Personal details
- Born: Ninfa Huarachi Condori; 24 December 1955 (age 70) Cotagaita, Potosí, Bolivia
- Party: Movement for Socialism (1999–present)
- Occupation: Politician; trade unionist

Ninfa Huarachi Condori (born 24 December 1955) is a Bolivian politician and trade unionist who served as a party-list member of the Chamber of Deputies from Tarija from 2010 to 2015.

Huarachi spent her early life in rural Potosí and relocated to Tarija following the closure of the mines. She worked as a street vendor and associated with the various merchants' guilds dotting the city. Huarachi served as secretary of finance for the New Dawn labor syndicate and was secretary of relations in the Tarija Federation of Guild Workers.

A member of the Movement for Socialism, Huarachi won a seat in the Chamber of Deputies in 2009, representing the guild organizations of Tarija Department. She played a hand in early drafts of a law providing government guarantees to small traders, which passed into law in 2022 – after she left office.

== Early life and career ==
=== Early life and education ===
Ninfa Huarachi was born on 24 December 1955 in Cotagaita, an agrarian settlement in the Quechua-populated Andean high plain, part of the Nor Chichas Province of southeastern Potosí Department. She attended primary in the vicinal mining community of Pulacayo, where her father was employed as a mineworker. Following his death at age 60, 4-year-old Huarachi and her three siblings settled with their mother further into the countryside, where they lived off a small widow's pension.

Huarachi married at age 14 and moved with her spouse to Tasna in the Quechisla mining district. She worked as a vendor on the mine outskirts, selling groceries to support her six children – and attended, at the same time, workshops in weaving and embroidery. Huarachi's family remained in Tasna until the mid-1980s, when the mine was closed and its workers laid off amid a nationwide process of industry downsizing.

=== Career and trade unionism ===
Together with her family, Huarachi settled in Tarija, accompanying the influx of rural migrants into the city in search of employment and economic opportunity. (Note: In Tarija – as in other cities – the closure of state enterprises sparked a wave of peripheral urbanization and demographic change, as popular classes (disoccupied miners, peasants, small retailers, etc.) migrated out of the countryside and into urban centers seeking better opportunities.) She set up shop as a street vendor, selling candies and confections in and around the city center. As a member of the informal economy, Huarachi integrated the various gremios 'guilds' representing Tarija's small traders (Note: The informal sector – defined as enterprises operating "outside the law"; unregulated and usually untaxed – constitutes a significant portion of Bolivia's economy, and the formal and informal markets frequently interact. Most of the country's small merchants, retailers, and vendors – known as gremialistas 'guild members'; lit. 'guildists' – self-organize into gremios 'guilds', which are recognized by and negotiate with government authorities.) – and, to a lesser extent, led community organizing efforts in the city's fast-growing outer neighborhoods.

Huarachi held leadership posts in the neighborhood council representing the Méndez Arcos barrio from 1988 on. Her primary activities, however, were as a guild member, representing the 15 April and, later, New Dawn merchants' syndicates – where she also held the post of secretary of finance. From 2006 to 2009, Huarachi served as secretary of relations for the Federation of Guild Workers of Tarija, the leading conglomerate representing fifty-plus guild organizations in the department.

== Chamber of Deputies ==
=== Election ===
Longtime adherence to left-wing viewpoints and early support for then-trade unionist Evo Morales led Huarachi to join the Movement for Socialism (MAS-IPSP) in 1999. However, it was her status as a guild member – not party affiliation – that facilitated her nomination for parliament in 2009. The MAS supported a policy of cooperation with small traders, offering guild organizations a quota of representatives on its slate of candidates – regardless of party membership. Elected to run by a grassroots congress of MAS-aligned organizations, Huarachi was included as a party-list candidate for Chamber of Deputies, representing Tarija, and won the seat.

=== Tenure ===
Huarachi held seats on the Social Welfare Committee, the Constitutional Review Committee, and the Departmental Autonomies Committee and served two terms as chair of the Energy and Hydrocarbons Committee^{[§]} – a post generally reserved for members of Tarija's delegation, (Note: A tarijeño held the chair of the Energy and Hydrocarbons Committee for all five years of the 2010–2015 legislative term.) considering the department's status as the country's top producer of crude oil and natural gas.

As a representative of the guild sector, Huarachi led early efforts to draft a dedicated law regulating the businesses of small traders. A preliminary bill was introduced in late 2011, to be reviewed and revised in direct cooperation with members of the sector. The legislation remained in active development over the following years and was finally passed into law in late 2022 – after Huarachi had already left office. Under its provisions, approximately 3.5 million small traders were given access to finance, welfare services, and retirement benefits. Remarking at an event commemorating its enactment, Rodolfo Mancilla of the Federation of Guild Workers of El Alto lauded Huarachi as "the cornerstone" of the law's development.

At the end of her term, Huarachi was not nominated for reelection. Among MAS-aligned social movement organizations, preference was to rotate out their representatives in parliament each election cycle, even as the core alliance with the government remained unchanged. In Huarachi's place, Nora Quisbert was selected, then elected to represent Tarija's guild sector in the lower chamber.

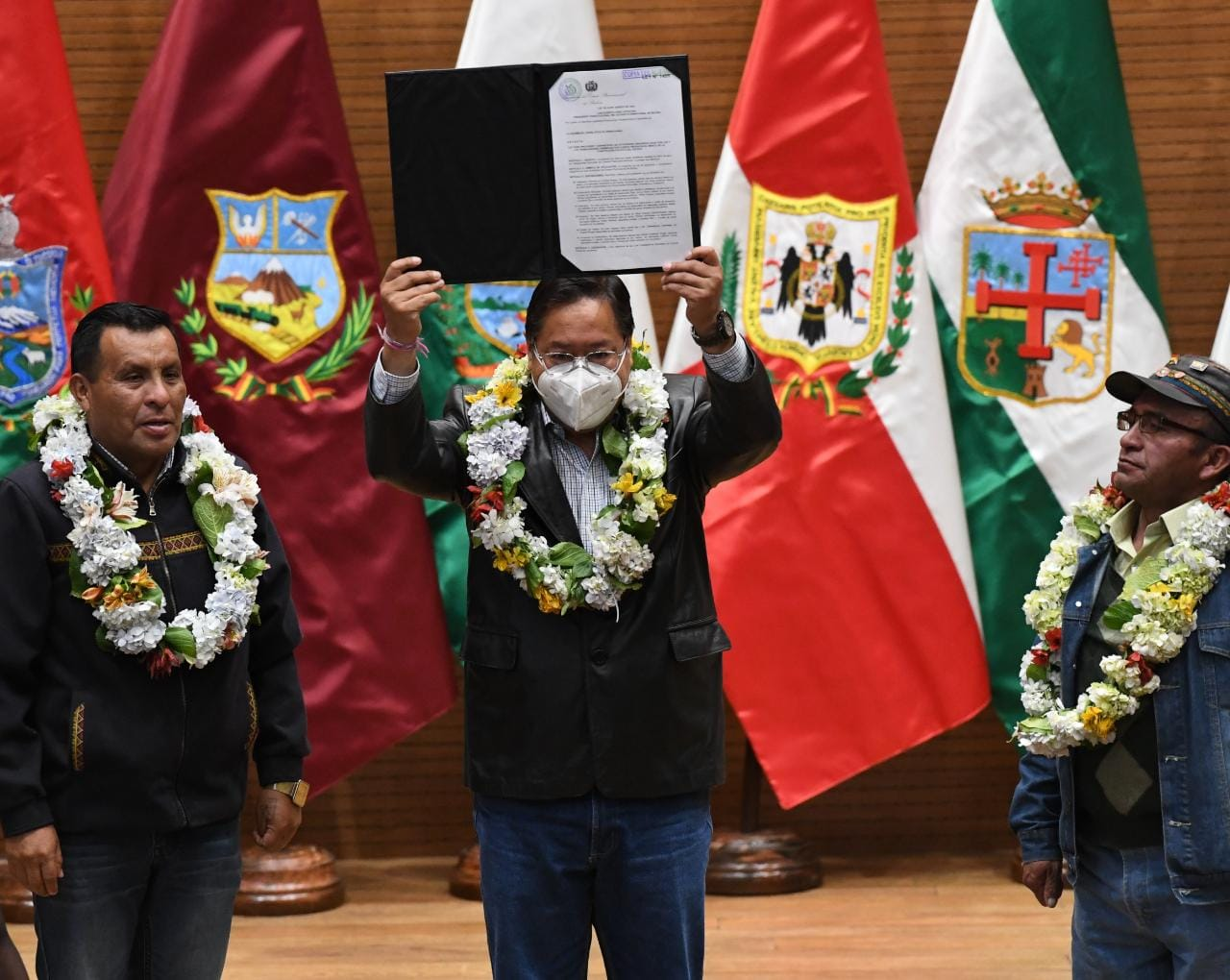
President Luis Arce enacts a law guaranteeing the rights of guild members, which was drafted in its initial stages by Huarachi.

=== Commission assignments ===
- Constitution, Legislation, and Electoral System Commission
  - Constitutional Review and Legislative Harmonization Committee (Secretary: 2011–2012)
- Plural Economy, Production, and Industry Commission
  - Energy and Hydrocarbons Committee (Secretary: 2012–2014)
- Territorial Organization of the State and Autonomies Commission
  - Departmental Autonomies Committee (2014–2015)
- Social Policy Commission
  - Social Welfare and Protection Committee (2010–2011)

== Electoral history ==
Electoral history of Ninfa Huarachi
Year	Office	Party	Votes			Result	Ref.
Year	Office	Party	Total	%	P.	Result	Ref.
2009	Deputy	Movement for Socialism	114,577	51.09%	1st	Won	(Note: Presented on an electoral list. The data shown represents the share of the vote the entire party/alliance received in that constituency.)
Source: Plurinational Electoral Organ | Electoral Atlas

Chamber of Deputies of Bolivia
Preceded by Simón Zurita	Member of the Chamber of Deputies from Tarija; 2010–2015	Succeeded by Nora Quisbert
