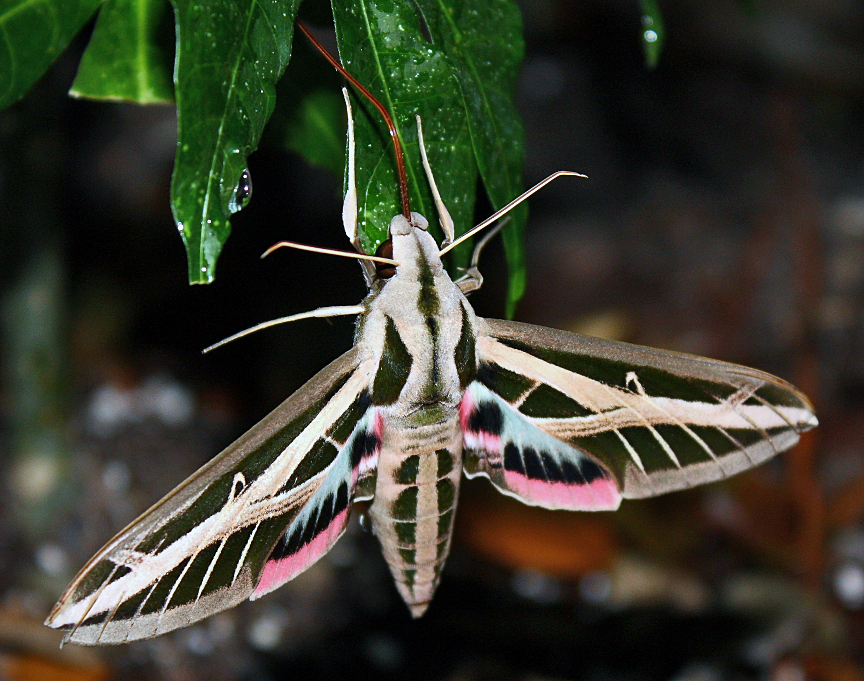

Scientific classification
- Domain: Eukaryota
- Kingdom: Animalia
- Phylum: Arthropoda
- Class: Insecta
- Order: Lepidoptera
- Family: Sphingidae
- Genus: Eumorpha
- Species: E. fasciatus

Binomial name
- Eumorpha fasciatus (Sulzer, 1776)

Synonyms
- Sphinx fasciatus Sulzer, 1776; Sphynx strigilis Vogel, 1822; Eumorpha jussieuae Hübner, 1816; Pholus fasciatus tupaci Kernbach, 1962

= Eumorpha fasciatus =

Banded sphinx moth

Species of moth

Eumorpha fasciatus, the banded sphinx, is a moth of the family Sphingidae. The species was first described by Johann Heinrich Sulzer in 1776.

== Distribution ==
It is found from northern Argentina, Bolivia, Paraguay, Uruguay, Brazil, Colombia, Ecuador and Peru, north through Central America (Mexico, Belize, Guatemala, Honduras, Nicaragua, Costa Rica and Panama) to southern California and southern Arizona, east to Texas, Oklahoma, Louisiana, Mississippi, Florida and South Carolina. Strays can be found north up to Missouri, Michigan, Indiana, Pennsylvania, New Jersey, New York and Nova Scotia. It is also found in the Caribbean.

== Description ==
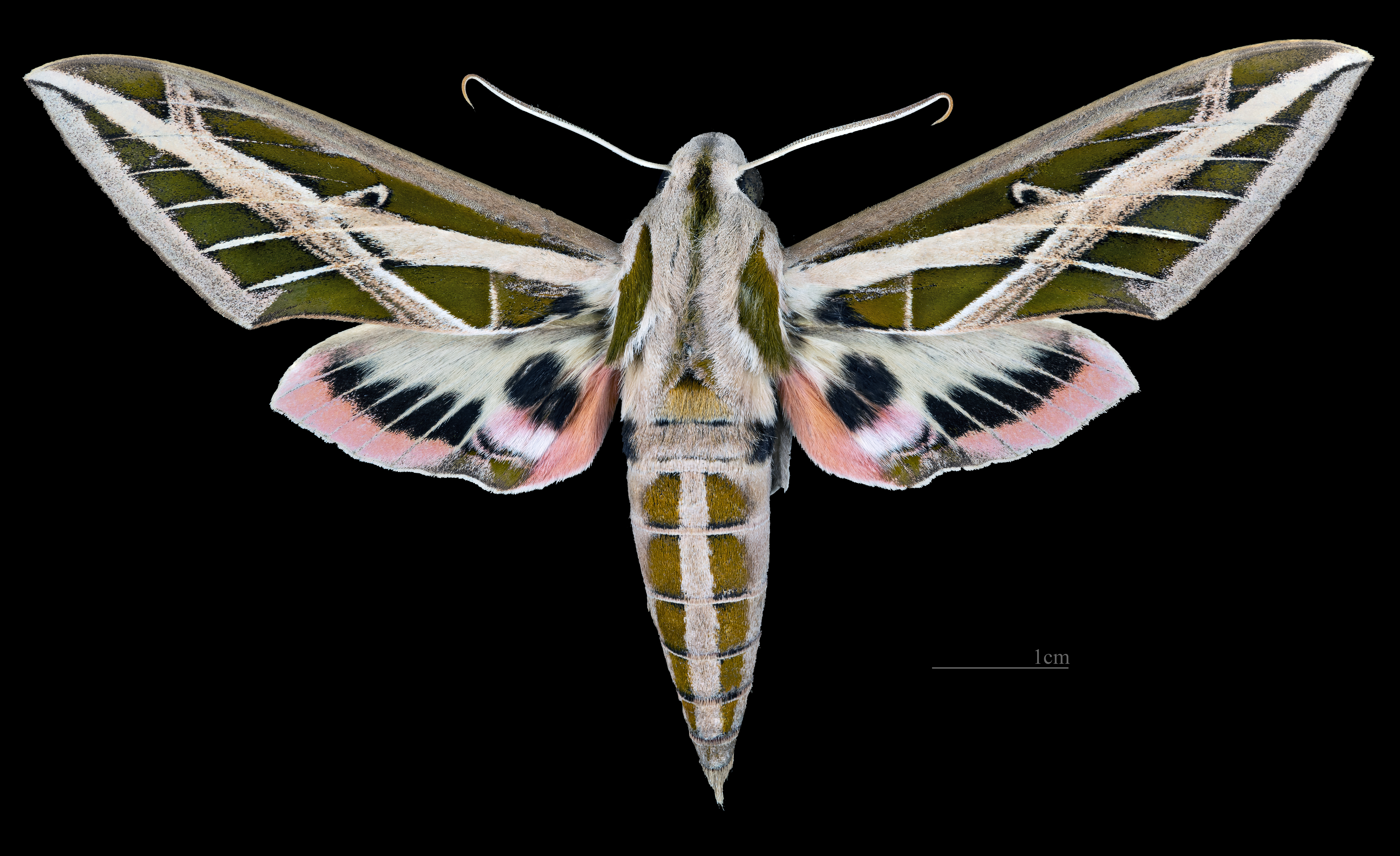
Male dorsal view

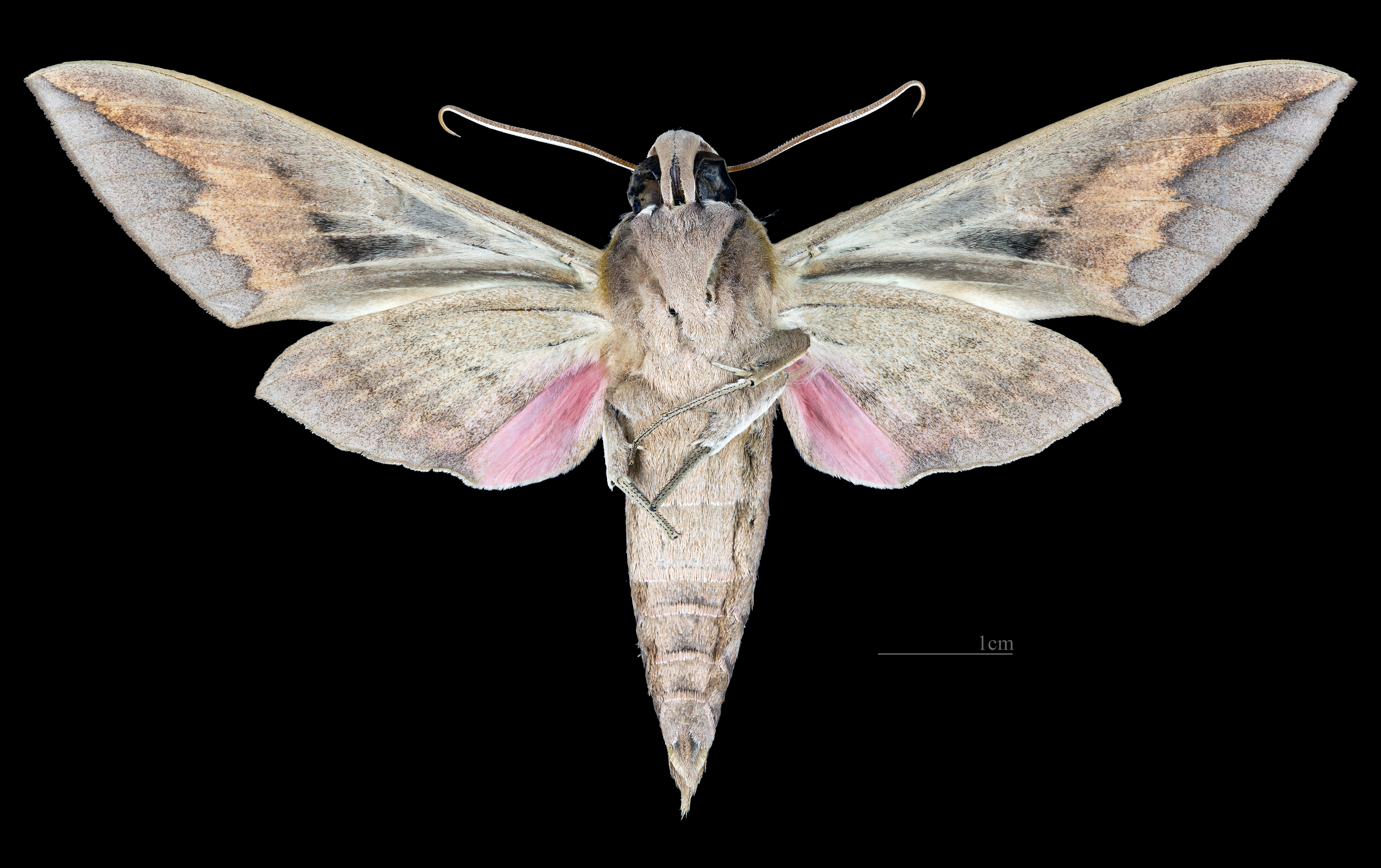
Male ventral view

== Biology ==
Adults are on wing year round in the tropics, but in the north, there are at least two generations with adults on wing from the end of May to July and the end of August to October in South Carolina and from May to October in Louisiana. Adults have been recorded feeding on nectar of Crinum, Catharanthus roseus, Petunia and Saponaria officinalis.

The larvae feed on Ludwigia (including L. decurrens, L. erecta, L. leptocarpa, L. octovalvis, L. peruviana and L. repens), Cissus verticillata, Fuchsia hybrida, Magnolia virginiana, Parthenocissus and Vitis species. The larvae are highly variable in patterning and depth of color. Pupation takes place in burrows.

== Subspecies ==
- Eumorpha fasciatus fasciatus
- Eumorpha fasciatus tupaci (Kernbach, 1962) (Galápagos Islands)

== Gallery ==
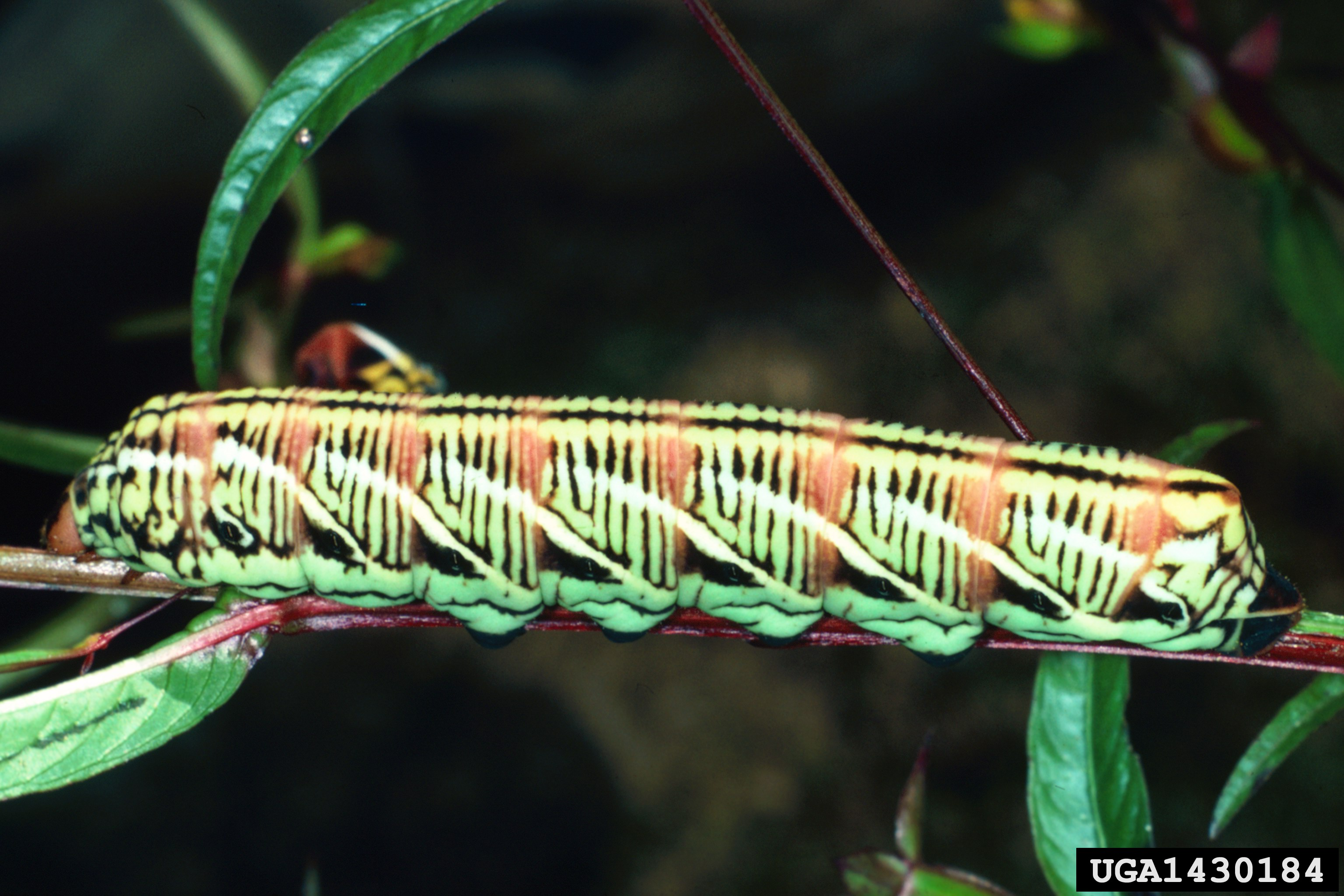
Larva

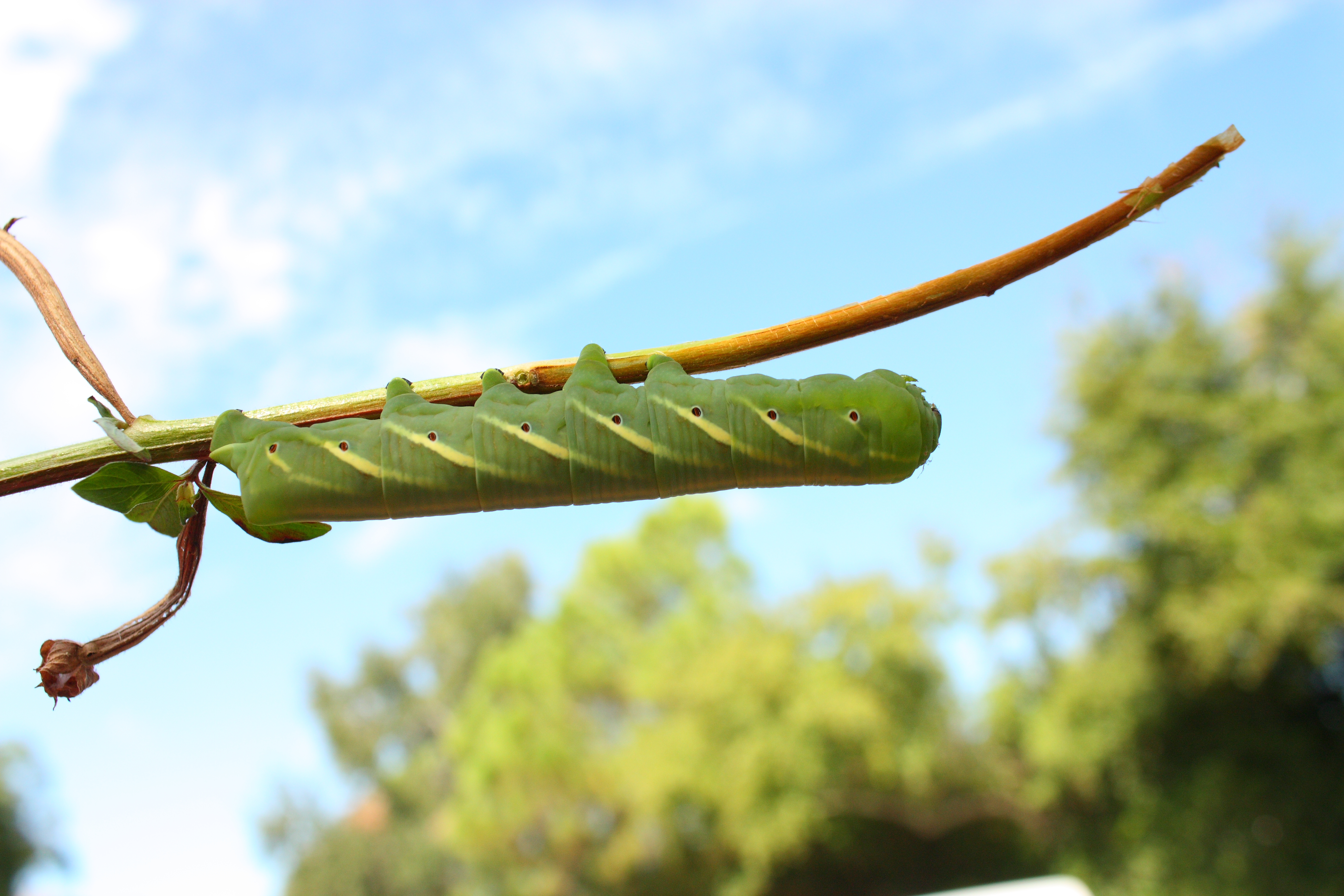
Larva, green variation

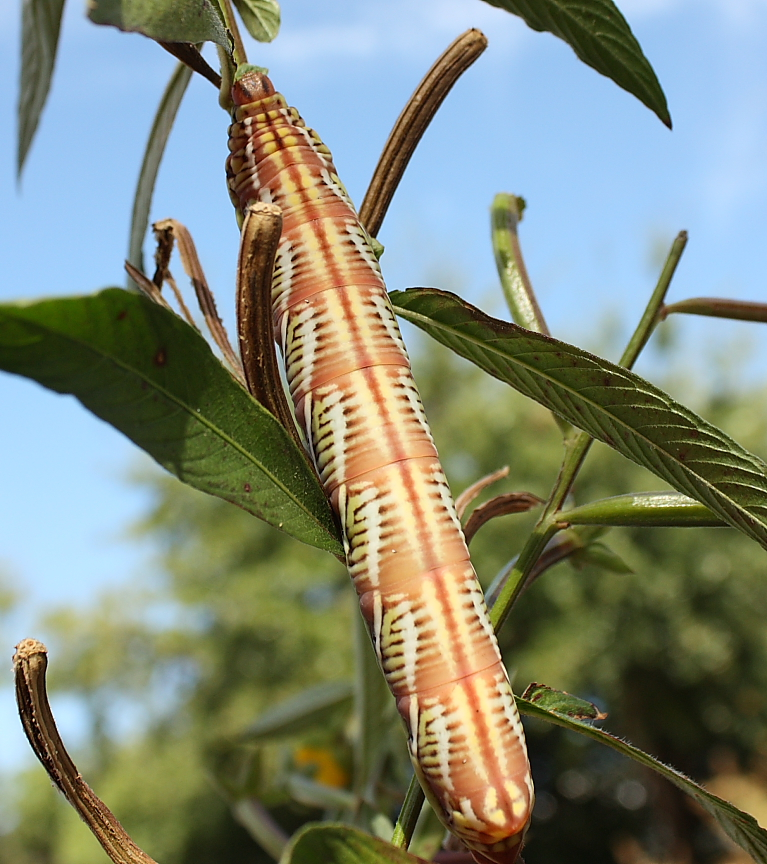
Larva, pink variation

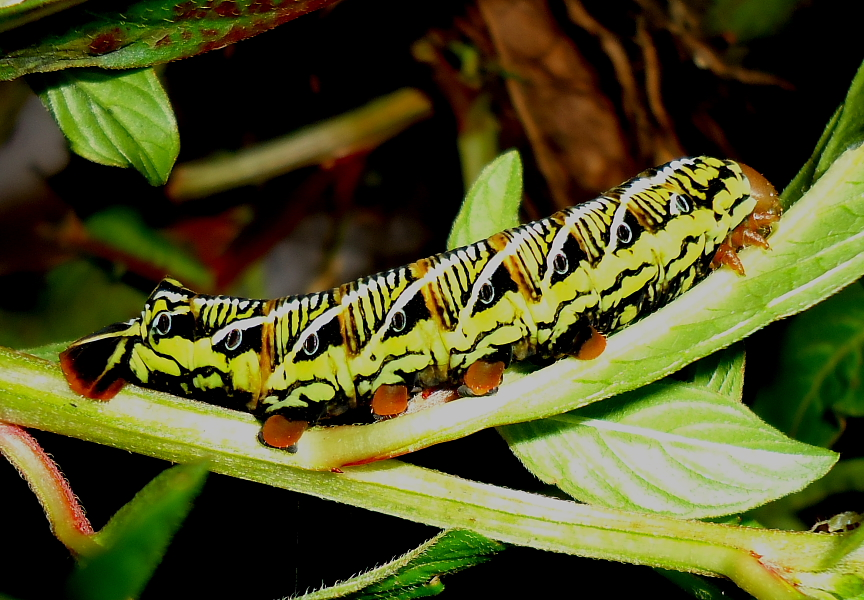
Larva, black variation

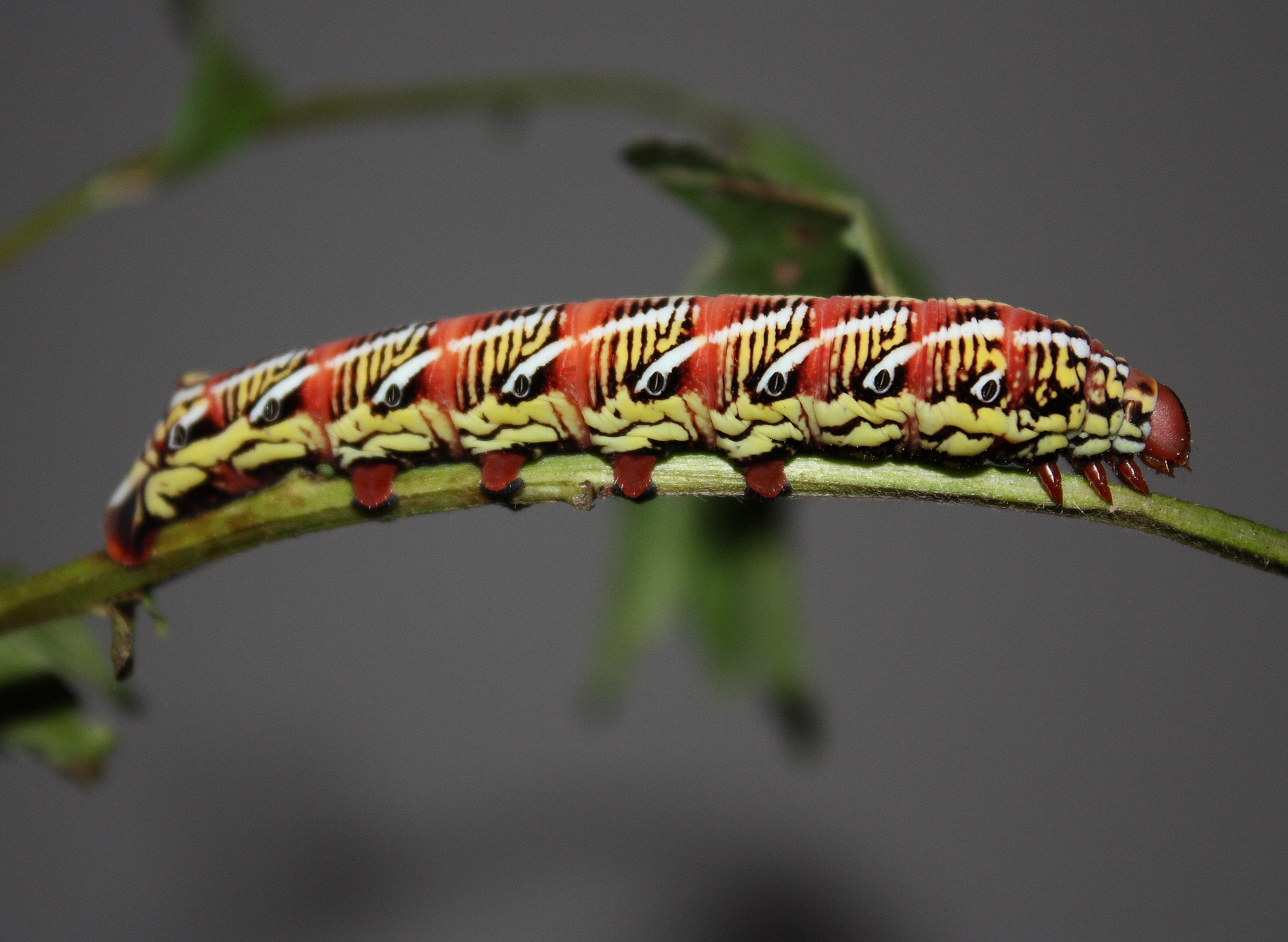
Larva, red variation

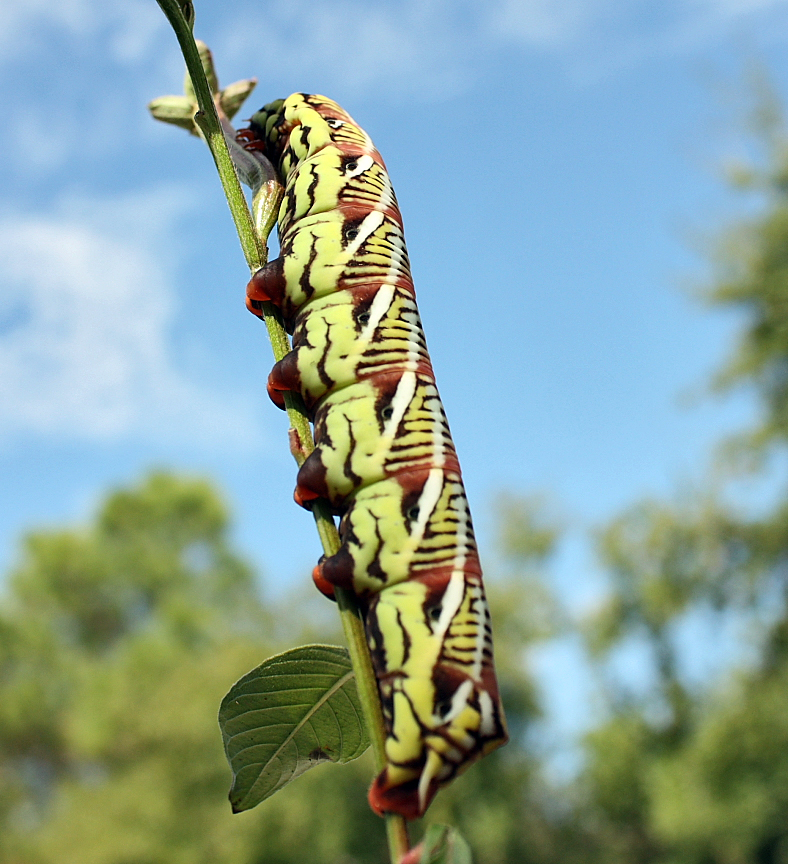
Larva, multi-colored variation

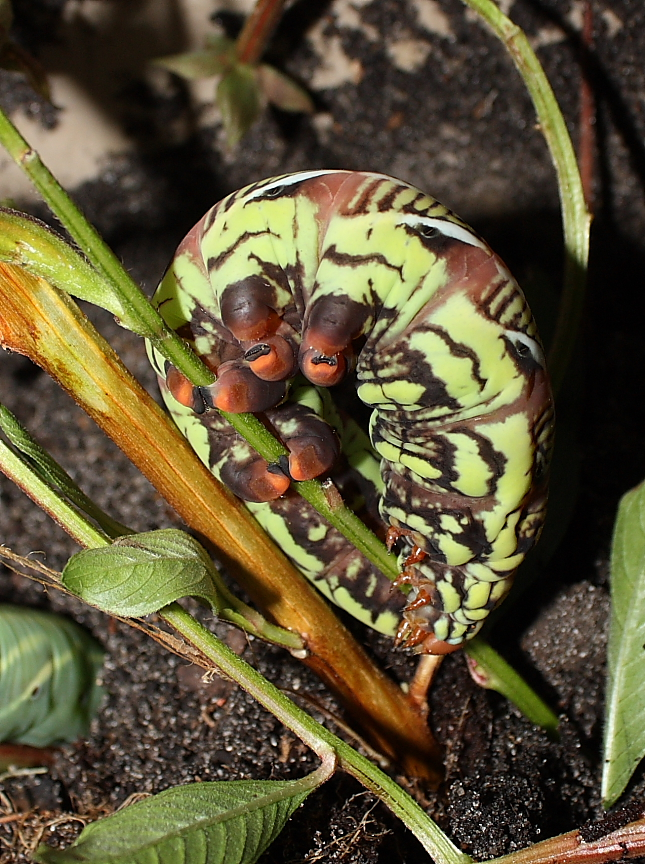

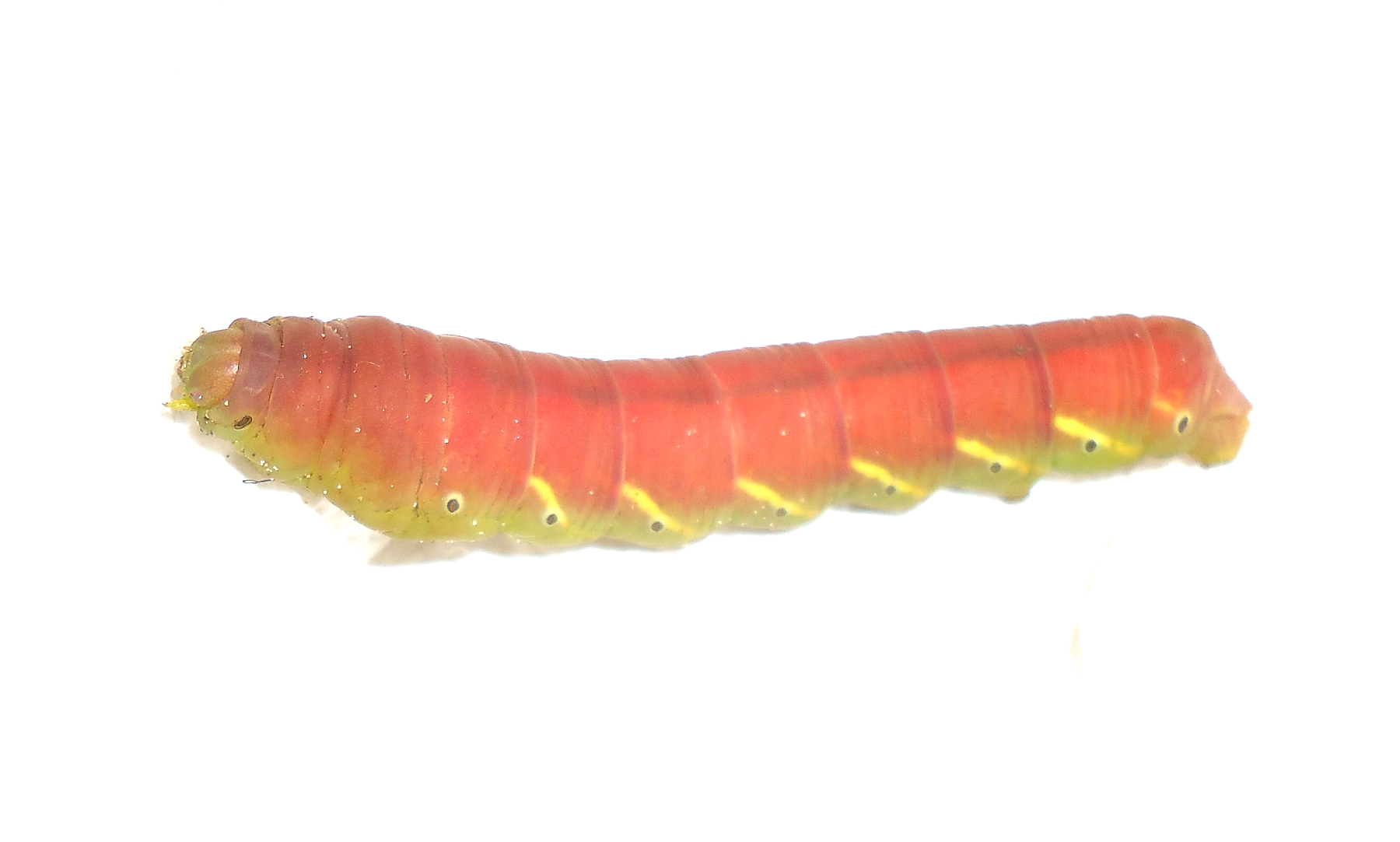
Pre-pupation color change

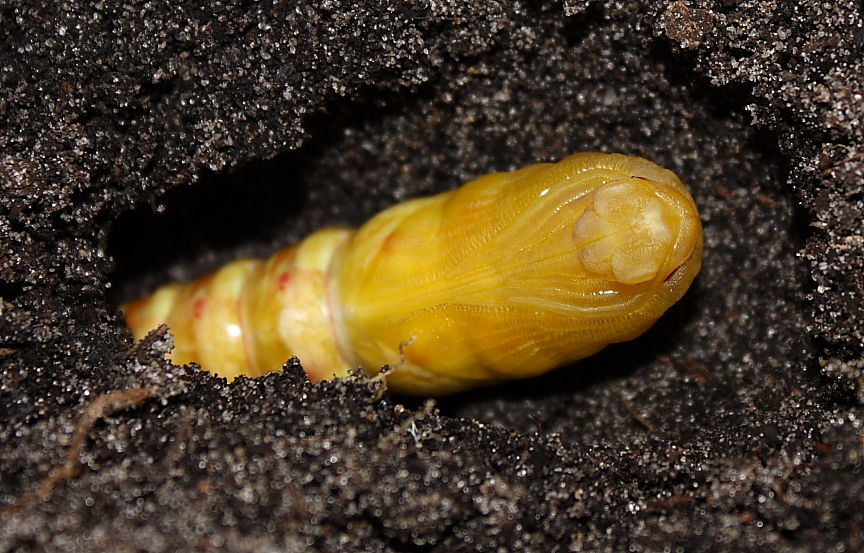
Mid pupation

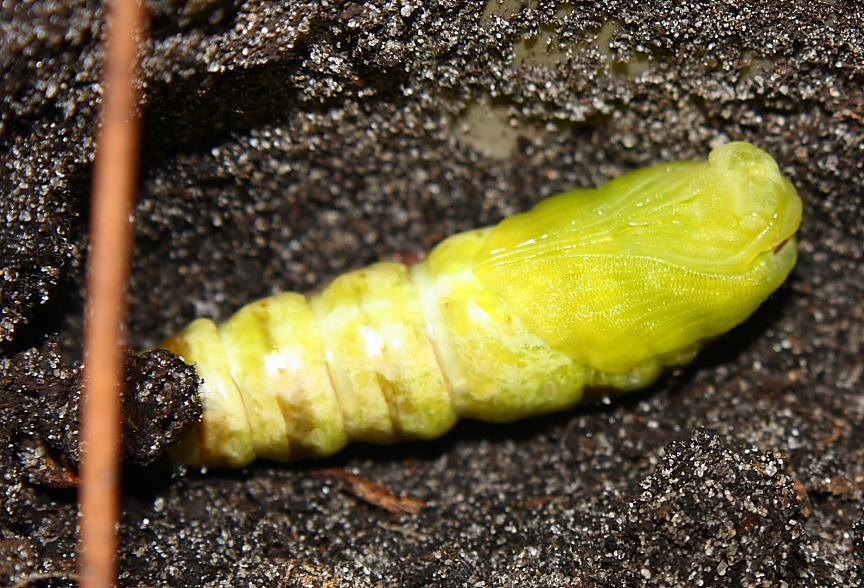
Freshly pupated

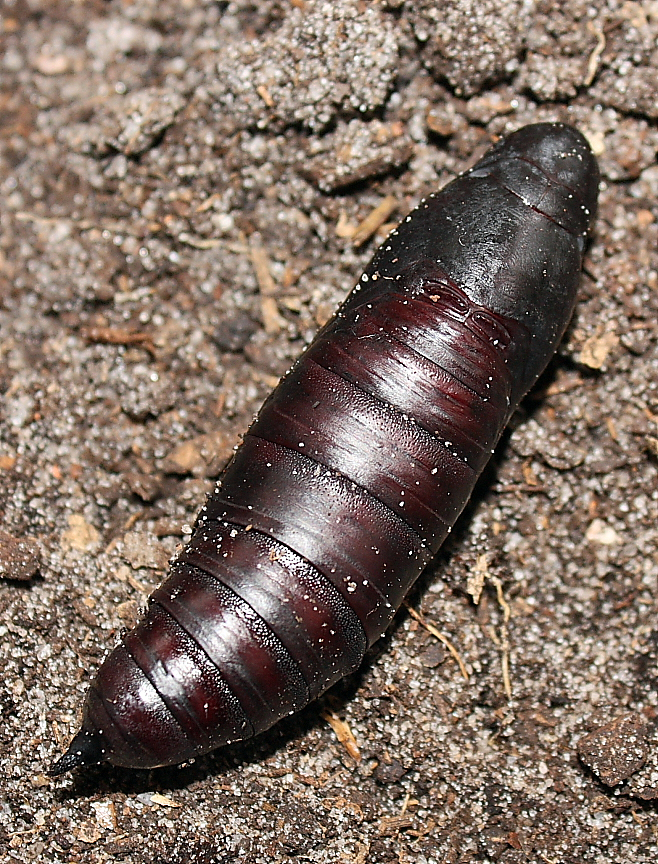
Pupa

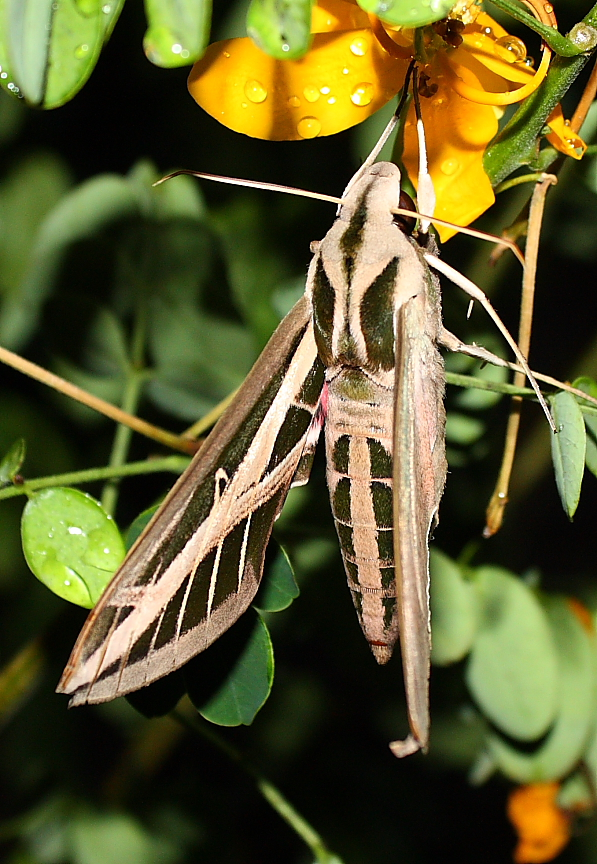
Imago (adult moth) back view

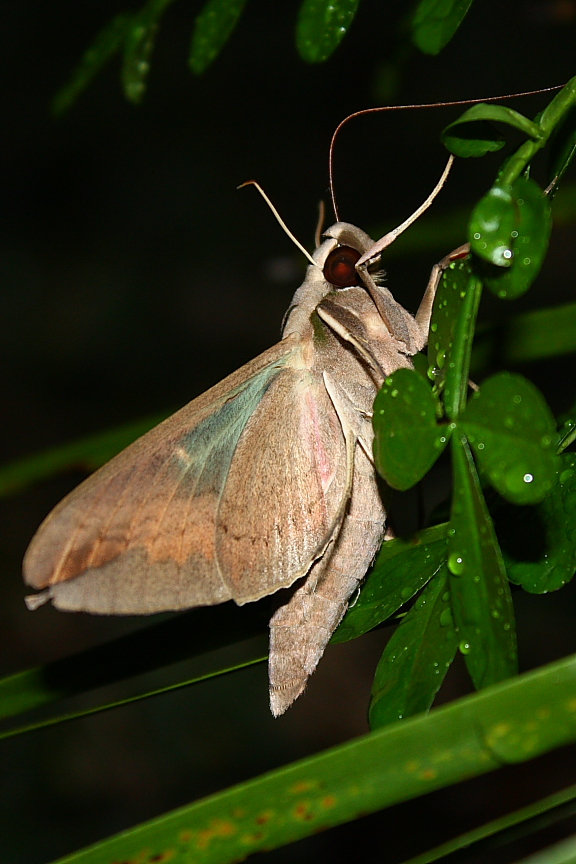
Imago side view

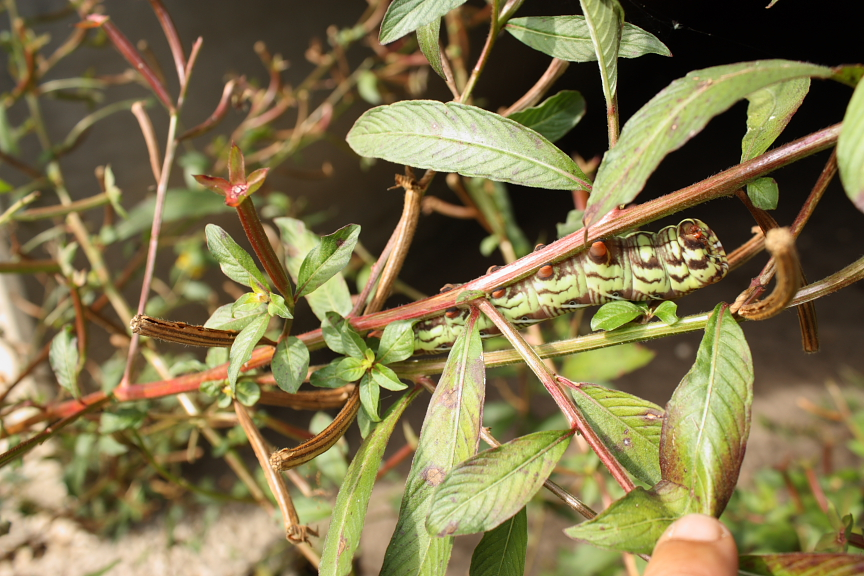
Larva on Ludwigia peruviana
