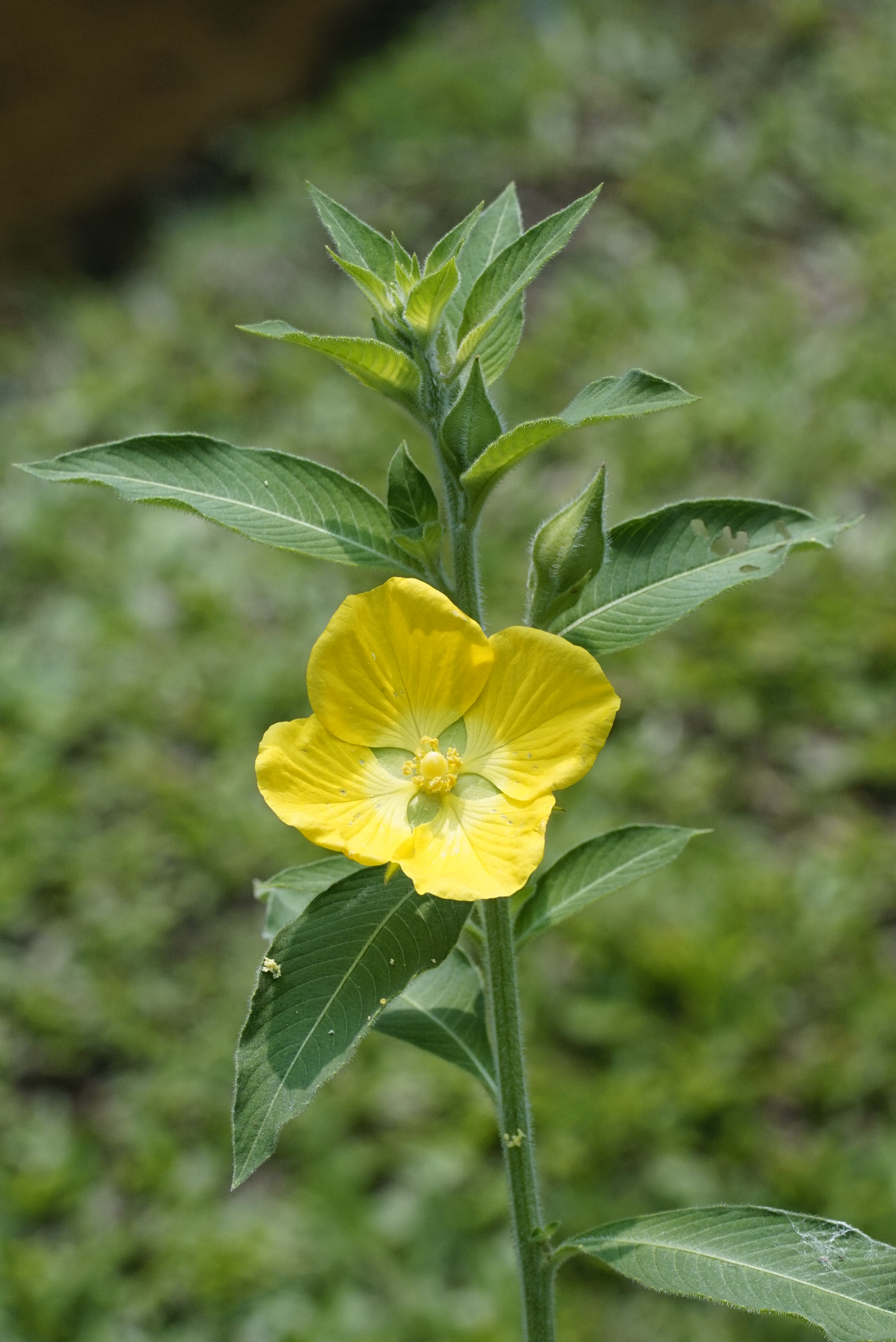

Scientific classification
- Kingdom: Plantae
- Clade: Tracheophytes
- Clade: Angiosperms
- Clade: Eudicots
- Clade: Rosids
- Order: Myrtales
- Family: Onagraceae
- Genus: Ludwigia
- Species: L. peruviana

Binomial name
- Ludwigia peruviana (L.) H.Hara

Synonyms
- Jussiaea hirta L.; Jussiaea macrocarpa Kunth.; Jussiaea mollis Kunth.; Jussiaea peruviana L.; Jussiaea speciosa Ridl.; Jussiaea springeri hort. ex. L.H. Bailey; Ludwigia hirta (L.) M. Gomez

= Ludwigia peruviana =

Species of plant

Ludwigia peruviana, with the common names Peruvian primrose-willow or Peruvian water primrose, is an aquatic, sometimes deciduous species of flowering plant in the evening primrose family. It can grow to approximately 12 feet (3.7 m) in height. While native to Peru, it has been introduced in many other countries for its attractive simple yellow flowers, it is now a common weed in swampy areas around the world.

== Ecological impact ==
The Peruvian primrose-willow forms dense colonies along the shore, then creeps into the water where it impedes navigation, damages structures, and competes with native vegetation. This species is classified as a category I invasive species by the United States state of Florida, where it clogs numerous lakes and rivers, and as a noxious weed by the government of Australia.
